= Rosenblum Cup =

Championship

Rosenblum Cup is an Open Teams event held every four years as part of the World Bridge Championships. The event was added to the world championships in New Orleans in 1978 to commemorate Julius Rosenblum, who served as president of the World Bridge Federation (WBF) until 1976. A similar event for women, the McConnell Cup, which takes place alongside the Rosenblum Cup was added in 1994.

The full name of this championship is World Open Knockout Teams. The knockout format pertains only to the late stages, however, evidently a six-round knockout with 64 teams in recent renditions. It appears that the field has been divided into sixteen groups for round-robin play, with the top four advancing from each group to the knockout stage.

== Results ==
Year, Site, Entries		Medalists
1978 New Orleans, USA 15 teams	1.	Frenkiel; Marian Frenkiel, Andrzej Macieszczak, Janusz Połeć, Andrzej Wilkosz, (Leonard Michniewski)* (Poland)
1978 New Orleans, USA 15 teams	2.	Chagas; Pedro Paulo Assumpção, Sérgio Barbosa, Marcelo Branco, Gabriel Chagas, Gabino Cintra, Roberto Taunay (Brazil)
1978 New Orleans, USA 15 teams	3.	(United States) Hamman — Bob Hamman, Dan Morse, Cliff Russell, Curtis Smith, Eddie Wold, Bobby Wolff (USA)
1978 New Orleans, USA 15 teams	3.	Chemla — Paul Chemla, Michel Lebel, Christian Mari, Michel Perron (France)
1982 Biarritz, France 129 teams	1.	Schemeil; Albert Faigenbaum, Michel Lebel, Dominique Pilon, Philippe Soulet (France)
1982 Biarritz, France 129 teams	2.	(United States) Martel; Ed Manfield, Chip Martel, Peter Pender, Hugh Ross, Lew Stansby, Kit Woolsey (USA)
1982 Biarritz, France 129 teams	3.	Andrews; Allan Graves, Sami Kehela, Eric Kokish, George Mittelman, Eric Murray, Peter Nagy (Canada)
1986 Miami Beach, USA 25 teams	1.	(United States) Robinson; Peter Boyd, Robert Lipsitz, Ed Manfield, Steve Robinson, Neil Silverman, Kit Woolsey (USA)
1986 Miami Beach, USA 25 teams	2.	Mahmood; Nishat Abedi, Nisar Ahmed, Jan-e-Alam Fazli, Zia Mahmood, (Mohamed Zakaris)** (Pakistan)
1986 Miami Beach, USA 25 teams	3.	Fallenius; Björn Fallenius, Magnus Lindkvist, Mats Nilsland, Anders Wirgren (Sweden)
1990 Geneva, Switzerland 179 teams	1.	Ludewig; Jochen Bitschene, Bernard Ludewig, Georg Nippgen, Roland Rohowsky (Germany)
1990 Geneva, Switzerland 179 teams	2.	(United States) Moss; Drew Casen, Charles Coon, Mike Moss, Michael Seamon (USA)
1990 Geneva, Switzerland 179 teams	3.	Stein — Boris Baran, Arno Hobart, Martin Kirr, Eric Kokish, George Mittelman, Mark Molson (Canada)
1990 Geneva, Switzerland 179 teams	3.	(United States) Rapee — Russ Ekeblad, Dan Morse, George Rapée, John Solodar, Ron Sukoneck, John Sutherlin (USA)
1994 Albuquerque, USA 119 teams	1.	(United States) Deutsch; Roger Bates, Seymon Deutsch, Gaylor Kasle, Chip Martel, Michael Rosenberg, Lew Stansby (USA)
1994 Albuquerque, USA 119 teams	2.	Otvosi; Cezary Balicki, Piotr Gawryś, Krzysztof Lasocki, Adam Żmudziński, (Marek Borewicz, Ervin Otvosi)** (Poland)
1994 Albuquerque, USA 119 teams	3.	Levit — Dani Cohen, Avi Kalish, Yeshayahu Levit, Leonid Podgur (Israel)
1994 Albuquerque, USA 119 teams	3.	Auby — Daniel Auby, Tomas Brenning, Tommy Gullberg, Mårten Gustawsson (Sweden)
1998 Lille, France 233 teams	1.	Angelini; Andrea Buratti, Massimo Lanzarotti, Lorenzo Lauria, Antonio Sementa, Alfredo Versace, (Francesco Angelini)* (Italy)
1998 Lille, France 233 teams	2.	Chagas; Marcelo Branco, João Paulo Campos, Gabriel Chagas, Miguel Villasboas (Brazil)
1998 Lille, France 233 teams	3.	Lindkvist — Björn Fallenius, Peter Fredin, Magnus Lindkvist, Mats Nilsland (Sweden)
1998 Lille, France 233 teams	3.	(United States) Bramley — Bart Bramley, Drew Casen, Steve Garner, Sidney Lazard, Bill Pollack, Howard Weinstein (USA)
2002 Montreal, Canada 160 teams	1.	Lavazza; Norberto Bocchi, Giorgio Duboin, Lorenzo Lauria, Alfredo Versace, (Guido Ferraro)* (Italy)
2002 Montreal, Canada 160 teams	2.	Munawar; Taufik Gautama Asbi, Franky Karwur, Henky Lasut, Eddy Manoppo, Denny Sacul, Robert Parasian Tobing (Indonesia)
2002 Montreal, Canada 160 teams	3.	(Poland) (Italy) Burgay; Cezary Balicki (POL), Leandro Burgay (ITA), Michał Kwiecień (POL), Carlo Mariani (ITA), Jacek Pszczoła (POL), Adam Żmudziński (POL)
2006 Verona, Italy 173 teams	1.	(United States) (Norway) Meltzer; Roger Bates (USA), Geir Helgemo (NOR), Tor Helness (NOR), Kyle Larsen (USA), Rose Meltzer (USA), Alan Sontag (USA)
2006 Verona, Italy 173 teams	2.	(Sweden) (United States) Henner; Peter Bertheau (SWE), Peter Fredin (SWE), Christal Henner (USA), Marc Jacobus (USA), Magnus Lindkvist (SWE), Fredrik Nyström (SWE)
2006 Verona, Italy 173 teams	3.	(Turkey) Yadlin; Eldad Ginossar (ISR), Avi Kalish (ISR), Melih Özdil (TUR), Leonid Podgur (ISR), Doron Yadlin (ISR), Israel Yadlin (ISR)
2010 Philadelphia, USA 144 teams	1.	(United States) Diamond; Fred Gitelman, Eric Greco, Geoff Hampson, Brad Moss, Brian Platnick, capt. John Diamond (USA)
2010 Philadelphia, USA 144 teams	2.	(United States) Nickell; Bob Hamman, Ralph Katz, Zia Mahmood, Jeff Meckstroth, Nick Nickell, Eric Rodwell (USA)
2010 Philadelphia, USA 144 teams	3.	(Italy) (Norway) (France) Zimmermann; Fulvio Fantoni (ITA), Geir Helgemo (NOR), Tor Helness (NOR), Franck Multon (FRA), Claudio Nunes (ITA), capt. Pierre Zimmermann (FRA)
2014 Sanya, China 123 teams	1.	Mazurkiewicz; Marcin Mazurkiewicz (captain), Piotr Gawryś, Stanisław Gołębiowski, Krzysztof Jassem, Michał Klukowski, Włodzimierz Starkowski (Poland)
2014 Sanya, China 123 teams	2.	Monaco; Pierre Zimmermann (captain), Fulvio Fantoni, Geir Helgemo, Tor Helness, Franck Multon, Claudio Nunes (Monaco)
2014 Sanya, China 123 teams	3.	(United States) Diamond — John Diamond (captain), Eric Greco, Geoff Hampson, Brian Platnick (USA); Sjoert Brink, Bas Drijver (Netherlands)
2014 Sanya, China 123 teams	3.	Ventin — Juan Carlos Ventin Camprubi (captain, Argentina); Sabine Auken, Roy Welland (Germany); Johan Upmark, Frederik Wrang (Sweden)
2018 Orlando, USA 97 teams	1.	Zimmermann; Piotr Gawryś, Michał Klukowski (Poland), Geir Helgemo, Tor Helness, Franck Multon, Pierre Zimmermann (Monaco)
2018 Orlando, USA 97 teams	2.	Lavazza; Alejando Bianchedi (Italy), Dennis Bilde (Denmark), Norberto Bocchi, Giorgio Duboin, Agustin Madala, Antonio Sementa, Maria Teresa Lavazza (n-p capt.), Massimo Ortensi (coach) (Italy)
2018 Orlando, USA 97 teams	3.	Allfrey — Alexander Allfrey, Edward Jones, Thomas Paske, Andrew Robson (England)
2018 Orlando, USA 97 teams	3.	(United States) Spector — Vincent Demuy, John Hurd, John Kranyak, Warren Spector (captain), Gavin Wolpert, Joel Wooldridge (USA)

* Michniewski in 1978, Angelini in 1998, and Ferraro in 2002 did not play enough boards in order to qualify for the title of World Champion
** Zakaris in 1986 and Borewicz–Otvosi in 1994 did not play enough boards in order to qualify for second place
