= European Team Championships (bridge) =

Biennial bridge championship

The European Team Championship bridge championship is held every two years. It is organised by the European Bridge League (EBL).

== Open ==
Open European Bridge League
Year	Event #	Location	Winners	Runners-up	Bronze
1997	43	Montecatini Terme, Italy	Italy Norberto Bocchi, Giorgio Duboin, Andrea Buratti, Massimo Lanzarotti, Lorenzo Lauria, Alfredo Versace	Poland Cezary Balicki, Adam Żmudziński, Apolinari Kawalski, Jacek Romanski, Michał Kwiecień, Jacek Pszczoła	Norway Boye Brogeland, Erik Seelensminde, Geir Helgemo, Tor Helness, Glenn Grotheim, Terje Åå
1999	44	Malta	Italy Dario Attanasio, Guiseppe Failla, Norberto Bocchi, Giorgio Duboin, Soldano de Falco, Guido Ferraro	Sweden Bjorn Fallenius, Mats Nilsland, Lars Andersson, Tommy Gullberg, Peter Fredin, Magnus Lindkvist	Norway Boye Brogeland, Erik Saelensminde, Arild Rasmussen, Jon Sveindal, Jon-Egil Furunes, Tor Helness
2001	45	Tenerife	Italy Norberto Bocchi, Dano De Falco, Giorgio Duboin, Guido Ferraro, Lorenzo Lauria, Alfredo Versace, Maria Teresa Lavazza (Captain)	Norway	Poland Cezary Balicki, Michał Kwiecień, Krzysztof Martens, Marcin Lesniewski, Adam Żmudziński, Jacek Pszczoła
2002	46	Salsomaggiore Term, Italy	Italy Francesco Angelini, Norberto Bocchi, Giorgio Duboin, Lorenzo Lauria, Alfredo Versace, Antonio Sementa, Maria Teresa Lavazza (Captain)	Spain Juan Carlos Ventín, Luis Lantarón, Antonio Francés, José Ignacio Torres, Andrea Buratti, Massimo Lanzarotti,	Norway
2004	47	Malmo, Sweden	Italy Norberto Bocchi, Giorgio Duboin, Claudio Nunes, Lorenzo Lauria, Fulvio Fantoni, Alfredo Versace	Sweden Peter Fredin, Johan Sylvan, Fredrik Nystrom, Per Olof Sundelin, Magnus Lindkvist, Peter Bertheau	Poland Bartosz Chmurski, Cezary Balicki, Mariusz Puczynski, Piotr Tuszynski, Apolinary Kowalski, Adam Zmudzinski
2006	48	Warsaw, Poland	Italy Norberto Bocchi, Giorgio Duboin, Claudio Nunes, Lorenzo Lauria, Fulvio Fantoni, Alfredo Versace	(Republic of Ireland) Ireland John Carroll, Tom Hanlon, Tommy Garvey, Nicholas Fitzgibbon, Adam Mesbur, Hugh Mcgann	Norway Ulf Haakon Tundal, Tor Helness, Geir Helgemo, Bjorn Olav Ekren, Boye Brogeland, Erik Saelensminde
2008	49	Pau, France	Norway Boerre Lund, Terje Aa, Geir Helgemo, Espen Lindqvist, Boye Brogeland, Jorgen Molberg,	Russia Georgi Matushko, Yury Khiuppenen, Jouri Khokhlov, Andrey Gromov, Vadim Kholomeev, Alexander Dubinin,	Germany Entscho Wladow, Josef Piekarek, Michael Gromoeller, Andreas Kirmse, Michael Elinescu, Alexander Smirnov
2010	50	Ostend, Belgium	Italy Norberto Bocchi, Giorgio Duboin, Lorenzo Lauria, Antonio Sementa, Agustin Madala, Alfredo Versace	Poland Krzysztof Buras, Cezary Balicki, Grzegorz Narkiewicz, Adam Zmudzinski, Krzysztof Kotorowicz, Jacek Kalita	Israel Ilan Herbst, Ophir Herbst, Yaniv Zack, Eldad Ginossar, Michael Barel, Ron Pachtman
2012	51	Dublin, Ireland	Monaco Claudio Nunes, Tor Helness, Geir Helgemo, Franck Multon, Pierre Zimmermann, Fulvio Fantoni	Netherlands Bauke Muller, Simon De Wijs, Bas Drijver, Sjoert Brink, Louk Verhees Jr, Ricco Van Prooijen,	Italy Norberto Bocchi, Giorgio Duboin, Lorenzo Lauria, Antonio Sementa, Agustin Madala, Alfredo Versace
2014	52	Opatija, Croatia	Israel Alon Birman, Lotan Fisher, Ilan Herbst, Ophir Herbst, Dror Padon, Ron Schwartz	Monaco Fulvio Fantoni, Geir Helgemo, Tor Helness, Franck Multon, Claudio Nunes, Pierre Zimmermann	England David Bakhshi, Tony Forrester, David Gold, Jason Hackett, Justin Hackett, Andrew Robson
2016	53	Budapest, Hungary	France Thomas Bessis, Francois Combescure, Cedric Lorenzini, Jean-Christophe Quantin, Jerome Rombaut, Frederic Volcker	Sweden Fredrik Nystrom, Mikael Rimstedt, Ola Rimstedt, Johan Sylvan, Johan Upmark, Frederic Wrang	Netherlands Sjoert Brink, Simon De Wijs, Bas Drijver, Bob Drijver, Bauke Muller, Bart Nab
2018	54	Ostend, Belgium	Norway Terje Aa, Boye Brogeland, Nils Kare Kvangraven, Espen Lindqvist, Allan Livgard, Ulf Haakon Tundal	Israel Ilan Bareket, Alon Birman, Assaf Lengy, Amir Levin, Dror Padon, Josef Roll	Russia Yury Khiuppenen, Jouri Khokhlov, Vadim Kholomeev, Georgi Matushko, Sergey Orlov, Evgeni Rudakov

== Senior ==
Senior
Year	Event #	Location	Winners	Runners-up	Bronze
1997	43	Montecatini Terme, Italy	France	Poland	Netherlands
1999	44	Malta	(France) France1 Adad, Sussel, Aujaleu, Delmouly, Roudinesco	PE/France	(France) France2
2001	45	Tenerife	Poland Wit Klapper, Andrzej Milde, Wlodzimierz Stobiecki, Wlodzimierz Wala, Jerzy Russyan, Andrzej Wilkosz		
2002	46	Salsomaggiore Term, Italy	France	Israel	Denmark
2004	47	Malmo, Sweden	Denmark Kirsten Steen Moller, Peter Lund, Steen Moller, Jens Auken, Flemming Dahl, Georg Norris	Poland Janusz Radecki, Antoni Zdzienicki, Andrzej Aleksandrzak, Krzysztof Sikorski, Jacek Korpetta, Kazimierz Omernik	France Albert Faigenbaum, Christian Mari, Jean-Louis Stoppa, Francois Stretz, Paul Chemla, Jose Damiani
2006	48	Warsaw, Poland	Germany	Sweden	France
2008	49	Pau, France	Turkey	Sweden	Belgium
2010	50	Ostend, Belgium	Poland	Denmark	Italy
2012	51	Dublin, Ireland	France	Poland	Scotland
2014	52	Opatija, Croatia	England	Sweden	Poland
2016	53	Budapest, Hungary	Israel	Sweden	Poland
2018	54	Ostend, Belgium	France	Sweden	Poland

== Ladies ==
Ladies Series European Bridge League Champions
Year	Event #	Location	Winners	Runners-up	Bronze
1997	43	Montecatini Terme, Italy	(United Kingdom) Great Britain Sandra Landy, Michele Handley, Liz McGowan, Heather Dhondy, Nicola Smith, Pat Davies	France Veronique Bessis, Michele Cronier, Catherine de Guillebon, Christine Lustin, Catherine D’ovidio, Pascale Thuillez	Israel Migri Zur Alba, Ruth Levit Porat, Ilana Barnes, Anda Barber, Daniela Birman, Matilda Poplilov
1999	44	Malta	(United Kingdom) Great Britain Sandra Landy, Abbey Walker, Liz McGowan, Heather Dhondy, Nicola Smith, Pat Davies	Austria Maria Erhart, Sylvia Terraneo, Doris Fischer, Gabriele Bamberger, Terry Weigkricht, Andreas Feichtinger	France Veronique Bessis, Catherine D'Ovidio, Danielle Avon, Christine Lustin, Benedicte Cronier, Sylvie Willard
2002	46	Salsomaggiore Term, Italy	Netherlands	Germany	England
2004	47	Malmo, Sweden	Sweden Catarina Midskog Pia Andersson Maria Gronkvist Catharina Ahlesved Kathrine Bertheau Linda Langstrom	Netherlands Jet Pasman Wietske Van Zwol Anneke SIMONS Carla Arnolds Femke Hoogweg Bep Vriend	France Veronique Bessis Catherine D'Ovidio Benedicte Cronier Daniele Gaviard Christine Lustin Sylvie Willard
2006	48	Warsaw, Poland	France	Netherlands	England
2008	49	Pau, France	France	Italy	Spain Marta Almirall, Nuria Almirall, Mari Carmen Babot, María Panadero, Cristina Bordallo, Marisa Matut
2010	50	Ostend, Belgium	France	Netherlands	Sweden
2012	51	Dublin, Ireland	England	France	Turkey
2014	52	Opatija, Croatia	Netherlands	England	France
2016	53	Budapest, Hungary	England	France	Poland
2018	54	Ostend, Belgium	Poland	Sweden	Norway

== Ladies Pairs ==
Ladies Pairs European Bridge League Champions
Year	Event #	Location	Winners	Runners-up	Bronze
1997	43	Montecatini Terme, Italy	Daniela von Arnim, Sabine Auken	Golin Olivieri (Italy) Cohen-Zuccarelli	
1999	44	Malta	Elisabeth Lacroix, Catherine Poulain		
