= European Champions' Cup (bridge) =

European bridge card competition

Organised by the European Bridge League (EBL), the European Champions' Cup is an annual contract bridge competition. Started in 2002, it features the top club team from each competing country.

== Open ==
European Champions Cup
Year	Event #	Location	Winners	Runners-up
2002	1		(Italy) Allegra, Turin Lorenzo Lauria, Alfredo Versace	
2003	2	Rome, Italy	(Italy) Tennis Club of Parioli Francesco Angelini, Antonio Sementa, Claudio Nunes, Fulvio Fantoni, Lorenzo Lauria, Alfredo Versace	(Sweden) Stockholm Per-Olov Sundelin, Pierre Bertheau, Fredrik Nystrom Johan Sylvan
2004	3	Barcelona, Spain	(Italy) Tennis Club of Parioli Francesco Angelini, Antonio Sementa, Claudio Nunes, Fulvio Fantoni, Lorenzo Lauria, Alfredo Versace	(Poland) Computerland Cezary Balicki, Adam Zmudzinski, Mariusz Kwiecinski, Wlodzimierz Starkowski, Wojtek Olanski, Stanislaw Golebiowski
2005	4	Brussels, Belgium	(Denmark) Schaltz Peter Fredin, Soren Christiansen, Martin Schaltz, Mathias Bruun, Dorthe Schaltz, Peter Schaltz,	(Italy) Tennis Club of Parioli Francesco Angelini, Antonio Sementa, Claudio Nunes, Fulvio Fantoni, Lorenzo Lauria, Alfredo Versace
2006	5	Rome, Italy	(Germany) Bamberg Bridge Club Entscho Wladow, Josef Piekarek, Michael Elinescu, Michael Gromoeller, Andreas Kirmse, Tomasz Gotard,	(Netherlands) The Lombard Rotterdam Bauke Muller, Simon De Wijs, Bas Drijver, Sjoert Brink, Vincent Ramondt, Berry Westra,
2007	6	Wroclaw, Poland	(Italy) Tennis Club of Parioli Francesco Angelini, Dana De Falco, Claudio Nunes, Fulvio Fantoni, Lorenzo Lauria, Alfredo Versace	(Poland) Sygnity AZS PW Wroclaw Andrey Gromov, Alexander Dubinin, Cezary Balicki, Adam Zmudzinski, Wojtek Olanski, Wlodzimierz Starkowski
2008	7	Amsterdam, Netherlands	(Italy) Tennis Club of Parioli Francesco Angelini, Ercole Bove, Claudio Nunes, Fulvio Fantoni, Lorenzo Lauria, Alfredo Versace	(Netherlands) Bridgeclub Star Henk Willemsens, Hans Kelder, Marcel Winkel, Marion Michielsen, Jacco Hop, Remco Bruggemann
2009	8	Paris, France	(Italy) Angelini Francesco Angelini, Valerio Giubilo, Claudio Nunes, Fulvio Fantoni, Lorenzo Lauria, Alfredo Versace	(Germany) BC Bamberger Reiter Michael Elinescu, Entscho Wladow, Michael Gromoeller, Helmut Hausler, Josef Piekarek, Alexander Smirnov
2010	9	Izmir, Turkey	(Netherlands) Onstein Bauke Muller, Bas Drijver, Simon de Wijs, Sjoert Brink	(Italy) Allegra Maria Teresa Lavazza, Norberto Bocchi, Giorgio Duboin, Guido Ferraro, Agustin Madala, Antonio Sementa
2011	10	Bad Honnef, Germany	(Netherlands) Onstein Bauke Muller, Bas Drijver, Simon de Wijs, Sjoert Brink	(Italy) Allegra Maria Teresa Lavazza, Norberto Bocchi, Giorgio Duboin, Guido Ferraro, Agustin Madala, Antonio Sementa
2012	11	Eilat, Israel	(Italy) Allegra Norberto Bocchi, Giorgio Duboin, Guido Ferraro, Agustin Madala, Antonio Sementa	(Italy) Angelini Leonardo Cima, Valerio Giubilo, Lorenzo Lauria, Federico Primavera, Alfredo Versace
2013	12	Opatija, Croatia	(Italy) G.S. Allegra Maria Teresa Lavazza, Norberto Bocchi, Giorgio Duboin, Guido Ferraro, Agustin Madala, Antonio Sementa	(Bulgaria) K1 Ivan Nanev, Victor Aronov, Diana Damianova, Rossen Gunev, Julian Stefanov
2014	13	Milan, Italy	(Italy) G.S. Allegra Maria Teresa Lavazza, Norberto Bocchi, Giorgio Duboin, Agustin Madala, Massimiliano Di Franco Gabriele Zanasi,	(Germany) Bamberger Reiter Michael Gromöller, Jörg Fritsche, Helmut Häusler, Andreas Kirmse, Josef Piekarek, Alexander Smirnov
2015	14	Milton Keynes, England	(Netherlands) BC T Onstein Louk Verhees, Berend van den Bos, Joris van Lankveld, Ricco van Prooijen, Richard Ritmeijer, Magdaléna Tichá	(Italy) G.S. Allegra Alejandro Bianchedi, Dennis Bilde, Norberto Bocchi, Massimiliano Di Franco, Giorgio Duboin, Agustin Madala
2016	15	Zagreb, Croatia	(Norway) Heimdal Allan Livgård, Terje Aa, Per Erik Austberg, Jan Tore Berg, Glenn Grøtheim, Peter Tøndel	Monaco Pierre Zimmermann, Dominik Filipowicz, Geir Helgemo, Tor Helness, Kristofer Martens, Franck Multon
2017	16	Riga, Latvia	(Norway) Vikersund BK Tormod Røren, Jon Aabye, Erik Eide, Sigurd Evjen, Øyvind Saur, Vidar Smith	(Netherlands) BC't Onstein Richard Ritmeijer, Peter Ijsselmuiden, Danny Molenaar, Geon Steenbakkers, Magdaléna Tichá, Tim Verbeek
2018	17	Eilat, Israel	(Netherlands) BC T Onstein	(Poland) Connector Marcin Woźniak, Konrad Araszkiewicz, Olech Bestrzyński, Krzysztof Kotorowicz, Piotr Nawrocki, Cezary Serek, Piotr Wiankowski
