= Goren Trophy =

American Contract Bridge League trophy

The Goren Trophy (formerly the Herman Trophy) is awarded to the player who wins the greatest number of masterpoints at the fall American Contract Bridge League (ACBL) North American Bridge Championship (NABC).

== History ==
The Herman Trophy was donated in 1951 by Sally Lipton, formerly Mrs. Lou Herman, in memory of Lou Herman (1908–1950), a Houston jeweler who was ACBL Life Master #218. Mrs. Lipton was a member of the ACBL office staff in New York and an ACBL tournament director. In 2008, the trophy was renamed the Goren Trophy to honor one of the game's greatest contributors, Charles Goren.

== Herman Trophy winners ==
Boldface numerals represent a record-breaking number of masterpoints.

Herman Trophy
Year	Winner	Masterpoints
1952	Al Roth	n/a
1953	John Crawford	n/a
1954	Paul Hodge	n/a
1955	Milton Ellenby	n/a
1956	Paul Hodge	n/a
1957	Lew Mathe	n/a
1958	Sylvia Stein	n/a
1959	Mort Rubinow	n/a
1960	Oswald Jacoby	n/a
1961	Phil Feldesman	n/a
1962	Marshall Miles	n/a
1963	Eric Murray	211
1964	Harold Rockaway	180
1965	Mike Lawrence	211
1966	Charles Coon	144
1967	Sami Kehela	155
1968	Henry Bethe	144
1969	Sylvia Stein	150
1970	Ira Rubin, Chuck Burger	154
1971	John Grantham	150
1972	Steve Robinson	181
1973	Larry T. Cohen	207
1974	Fred Hamilton	202
1975	Walt Walvick	171
1976	Paul Soloway	199
1977	John Mohan	160
1978	Bob Hamman	165
1979	Bobby Levin	**233**
1980	Jeff Meckstroth	225
1981	Chip Martel	225
1982	Jeff Meckstroth, Eric Rodwell	191
1983	Marty Bergen	**233**
1984	Grant Baze	200
1985	Eric Rodwell	**364.75**
1986	Kit Woolsey, Ed Manfield	211.55
1987	Jill Meyers	176.00
1988	Bob Hamman	269.55
1989	Mark Molson	253.71
1990	Eddie Wold	276.26
1991	David Berkowitz	356.65
1992	Haig Tchamitch	201.66
1993	Bob Hamman	355.13
1994	Mark Lair	**365.06**
1995	Jeff Meckstroth	**407.77**
1996	Michael Rosenberg	**445.77**
1997	Bart Bramley, Sidney Lazard	320.31
1998	Eric Rodwell	328.59
1999	Geir Helgemo	**449.37**
2000	George Jacobs	365.22
2001	George Jacobs, Alfredo Versace	333.75
2002	Dan Morse	388.81
2003	Geoff Hampson	374.79
2004	Jeff Meckstroth	381.16
2005	Zia Mahmood	416.88
2006	Drew Casen, Jim Krekorian	334.13
2007	Lew Stansby	375.28

== Goren Trophy winners ==
Boldface numerals represent a record-breaking number of masterpoints.

Goren Trophy
Year	Winner	Masterpoints
2008	Eric Rodwell	**623.75** *
2009	Jeff Meckstroth	377.66
2010	Steve Garner	326.20
2011	James Cayne, Michael Seamon	378.63
2012	Zia Mahmood	348.08
2013	Agustin Madala	402.22
2014	Allan Graves, Richard Schwartz	377.02
2015	Boguslaw Gierulski, Ron Pachtmann, Jerzy Skrzypczak, Piotr Zatorski	375.94
2016	Eric Greco	382.88
2017	Joe Grue	266.10
2018	Joe Grue	422.31
2019	Sjoert Brink, Bas Drijver, Jacek Kalita, Michal Nowosadzki, Jacek Pszczoła	400.00
2020	no winner (cancelled due to COVID-19)	
2021	Geoff Hampson	356.88
2022	Simon Cope, Kevin Rosenberg	404.00

== See also ==
- Mott-Smith Trophy
- Fishbein Trophy
