= Charles Coon (bridge) =

American bridge player

Charles Coon (June 2, 1931 – January 18, 2003) was an American bridge player. He finished second in two world championships and won six North American Bridge Championships (NABC).

A son of Carleton Coon, Coon was from Gloucester, Massachusetts. He graduated from Harvard College and served in the Korean War. Then he "devoted himself to playing bridge" but "[u]nlike other top players, he spent nearly all his time playing for money in clubs and earning himself a modest income." He was manager of the Boston Chess Club as of March 1961. He died in Staten Island at age 71 in 2003.

Coon's first "national"-level victory in the American Contract Bridge League was his greatest. He was one of "four young bridge experts led by Robert F. Jordan" who won the annual Vanderbilt Cup in 1961, when it was contested in a 64-team double-elimination tournament. Jordan played with Arthur Robinson, also of Philadelphia, and Coon played with Eric Murray of Toronto. Coon–Murray went on to qualify for the 6-man North America team in the 1962 Bermuda Bowl where they finished second to Italy's Blue Team.

== Bridge accomplishments ==
=== Awards ===
- Herman Trophy (1) 1966

=== Wins ===
- North American Bridge Championships (6)
  - Leventritt Silver Ribbon Pairs (1) 2000
  - Wernher Open Pairs (1) 1989
  - Blue Ribbon Pairs (1) 1966
  - Nail Life Master Open Pairs (1) 1964
  - Vanderbilt (1) 1961
  - Chicago Mixed Board-a-Match (1) 1962

=== Runners-up ===
- Bermuda Bowl (1) 1962
- Rosenblum Cup (1) 1990
- North American Bridge Championships (3)
  - Mitchell Board-a-Match Teams (2) 1964, 1968
  - Reisinger (1) 1961
