= Eric Kokish =

Canadian bridge player (1947–2023)

- Born: 19 May 1947; Montreal, Quebec, Canada
- Died: 10 June 2023 (aged 76)
- Education: McGill University

Eric O. Kokish (May 19, 1947 – June 10, 2023) was a Canadian professional bridge player, writer, and coach from Montreal.

== Biography ==
Kokish was born in Montreal on May 19, 1947. He graduated from McGill University.

In 1978, Kokish finished second in the World Open Pairs.

Kokish was the coach of Nick Nickell's professional team for many years. He first worked as coach for the Brazil national team in 1985 and later coached the Indonesia team briefly, a stint interrupted by political unrest in Jakarta. Around the Indonesia job he and his family relocated from Montreal to Toronto.

Kokish was inducted into the ACBL Hall of Fame in 2011. Kokish was inducted into the Canadian Bridge Federation's Hall of Fame.

In major teams-of-four competition, he was a five-time winner of the Canadian National Teams Championship (Flight A), all during the time from 1980 to 1999 when the winner routinely represented Canada in that year's or next year's world championship tournament, or in a preliminary Tri-Country Playoff with Mexico and Bermuda. Thus he played on Canada teams in the 1980 Olympiad, 1982 Rosenblum, 1986 Rosenblum, 1995 Bermuda Bowl, and 1996 Olympiad. Those teams won a bronze medal in the 1982 Rosenblum Cup and a silver medal in the Bermuda Bowl. George Mittelman was also a member of all five teams.

Eric loved to work with younger people and trained the young pair (U16) of Darwin Li (Canada) and Anshul Bhatt (India) who went on to win multiple Gold medals at the World Youth Bridge Championships in Italy in 2022. Bhatt wrote this obituary for Eric.

Kokish died on June 9, 2023, at the age of 76.

== Bridge accomplishments ==
=== Honors ===
- ACBL Hall of Fame, 2011

=== Awards ===
- Blackwood Award 2011

=== Wins ===
- North American Bridge Championships (2)
  - Vanderbilt (1) 1974
  - Mitchell Board-a-Match Teams (1) 1978

=== Runners-up ===
- World Open Pairs Championship (1) 1978
- North American Bridge Championships
  - Vanderbilt (1) 1980
  - Mitchell Board-a-Match Teams (1) 1974
  - Reisinger (1) 1982
  - Spingold (1) 1982
