= Edward O. Taylor =

American bridge player

Edward Oldham Taylor (October 9, 1912 – November 5, 1984) was an American bridge player from Glendale, California.

Taylor was born in Kansas City, Missouri.

== Bridge accomplishments ==
=== Wins ===
- North American Bridge Championships (7)
  - von Zedtwitz Life Master Pairs (1) 1963
  - Silodor Open Pairs (1) 1959
  - Open Pairs (1928-1962) (1) 1957
  - Mitchell Board-a-Match Teams (2) 1957, 1962
  - Reisinger (2) 1959, 1962

=== Runners-up ===
- North American Bridge Championships
  - Vanderbilt (1) 1963
