= Malcolm Brachman =

American bridge player (1926–2005)

Malcolm Katzenstein Brachman (December 9, 1926 – January 11, 2005) was an American bridge player who won a world championship.

Brachman was born in Fort Worth, Texas.

Brachman was married to Minda Delugach Brachman, a high-ranking player in the ACBL who won its annual mixed teams championship (Master Mixed Teams) in 1968 playing with Helen Sobel Smith, Oswald Jacoby, and Jim Jacoby. She died on March 19, 2003.

He graduated from Yale University (BA) and Harvard University (Ph.D. physics), and later instructed at the University of Chicago and Southern Methodist University.

In 2023, a TikTok user uploaded a video captioned "Thrifting is fun until you find a handmade gift of someone's entire life," after she found a handmade Monopoly-style boardgame that was made for Brachman. The game is dated December 9, 1985, which was Brachman's 59th birthday. The board references different life events, including Paschal High School, ROTC, Harvard University, the University of Chicago, and Yale University.

== Bridge accomplishments ==
=== Wins ===
- Bermuda Bowl (1) 1979
- North American Bridge Championships (7)
  - Vanderbilt (1) 1978
  - Reisinger (3) 1976, 1980, 2003
  - Spingold (3) 1978, 1983, 1986

=== Runners-up ===
- North American Bridge Championships
  - Grand National Teams (2) 1998, 2004
  - Vanderbilt (1) 1976
  - Mitchell Board-a-Match Teams (1) 1984
  - Reisinger (1) 1990
