= Ben Fain =

American bridge player

Benjamin Fain (March 25, 1903 – February 12, 1976) was an American bridge player. He was born in New York City and died in Houston, Texas.

== Bridge accomplishments ==
=== Wins ===
- North American Bridge Championships (6)
  - von Zedtwitz Life Master Pairs (1) 1955
  - Fall National Open Pairs (1) 1956
  - Senior and Advanced Senior Master Pairs (1) 1951
  - Mitchell Board-a-Match Teams (2) 1953, 1956
  - Reisinger (1) 1955

=== Runners-up ===
- North American Bridge Championships
  - Reisinger (2) 1956, 1957
