= Arthur S. Goldsmith =

American bridge player

Arthur S. Goldsmith (February 26, 1909 - February 3, 1995) was an American bridge player. Goldsmith is from Lyndhurst, Ohio. He graduated from Yale University and received a J.D. from Western Reserve University.

== Bridge accomplishments ==
=== Wins ===
- North American Bridge Championships (5)
  - Marcus Cup (1) 1951
  - Mitchell Board-a-Match Teams (3) 1947, 1954, 1958
  - Spingold (1) 1949

=== Runners-up ===
- North American Bridge Championships
  - Open Pairs (1928-1962) (1) 1944
  - Reisinger (2) 1949, 1952
  - Spingold (2) 1946, 1952
