= Paul Hodge =

American bridge player

Paul Herbert Hodge (March 24, 1910 – December 26, 1976) was an American bridge player.

Hodge was originally from Meers, Oklahoma and grew up in Norman. He attended the University of Oklahoma, earning a bachelor's degree and then a law degree. After 10 years working as an attorney in Oklahoma, he moved to Abilene, Texas, where he lived for 21 years. He worked as an attorney until 1967, when he moved to Houston and set up a bridge club. He died in a hospital in Houston after a four-month illness. Hodge was inducted into the ACBL Hall of Fame in 2010.

== Bridge accomplishments ==
=== Honors ===
- ACBL Hall of Fame, 2010

=== Awards ===
- Fishbein Trophy (1) 1955
- Herman Trophy (2) 1954, 1956

=== Wins ===
- North American Bridge Championships (9)
  - von Zedtwitz Life Master Pairs (1) 1955
  - Rockwell Mixed Pairs (1) 1953
  - Open Pairs (1928-1962) (2) 1954, 1956
  - Marcus Cup (1) 1955
  - Mitchell Board-a-Match Teams (2) 1953, 1956
  - Reisinger (2) 1955, 1964

=== Runners-up ===
- Bermuda Bowl (1) 1961
- North American Bridge Championships
  - Wernher Open Pairs (2) 1957, 1960
  - Vanderbilt (1) 1959
  - Mitchell Board-a-Match Teams (1) 1960
  - Reisinger (3) 1956, 1957, 1959
  - Spingold (1) 1967
