= Bluhm =

Bluhm is a surname. Notable people with the surname include:

- Brady Bluhm (born 1983), American actor
- Heidrun Bluhm (born 1958), German politician and member of Die Linkspartei
- Kay Bluhm (born 1968), East German-German flatwater canoe racer
- Lou Bluhm (1940–1990), American bridge player
- Neil Bluhm (born 1938), American billionaire real estate and casino magnate, philanthropist
- Norman Bluhm (1921–1999), American abstract expressionist painter
- Red Bluhm (1894–1952), Major League Baseball player for the Boston Red Sox
- Tim Bluhm (born 1970), Californian singer/guitarist and songwriter of the rock band The Mother Hips
