= European Team Championships =

European Team Championships is the name of the team sports competition between European countries organized by various European sports federations. May refer to:

- European Athletics Team Championships, former European Team Championships (ETC), athletics team competition between different countries of Europe
- European Mixed Team Badminton Championships, badminton team competition between different countries of Europe
- European Bowls Team Championships, bowls team competition between different countries of Europe
- European Team Championships (bridge), bridge team competition between different countries of Europe
- European Team Chess Championship, chess team competition between different countries of Europe
- European Combined Events Team Championships, combined events team competition between different countries of Europe
- European Golf Team Championships, golf team competition between different countries of Europe
- European Race Walking Team Championships, race walking team competition between different countries of Europe
- European Squash Team Championships, squash team competition between different countries of Europe
