= Arthur G. Robinson =

American bridge player

Arthur G. Robinson (born 1936) was an American bridge player from Villanova, Pennsylvania. During the 1960s he played on three North America or USA open teams that were runners-up to Italy (the Blue Team) in world championships. Robert Jordan was his regular partner on all three occasions.

Robinson's first "national"-level victory in the American Contract Bridge League may have been his greatest. He was one of "four young bridge experts led by [Jordan]" who won the annual Vanderbilt Cup in 1961, when it was contested in a 64-team double-elimination tournament. Their teammates were Charlie Coon, manager of the Boston Chess Club, and Eric Murray, a Toronto lawyer. Jordan–Robinson went on to qualify for the 6-man North America team in the 1963 Bermuda Bowl where they finished second to Italy's Blue Team—as Coon–Murray had qualified in 1962 with the same result.

== Bridge accomplishments ==
=== Wins ===
- North American Bridge Championships (5)
  - Silodor Open Pairs (1) 1962
  - Vanderbilt (2) 1961, 1968
  - Reisinger (2) 1966, 1967

=== Runners-up ===
- North American Bridge Championships
  - Master Individual (1) 1960
  - Vanderbilt (1) 1965
  - Reisinger (1) 1961
