= Andrew Gromov =

Russian bridge player

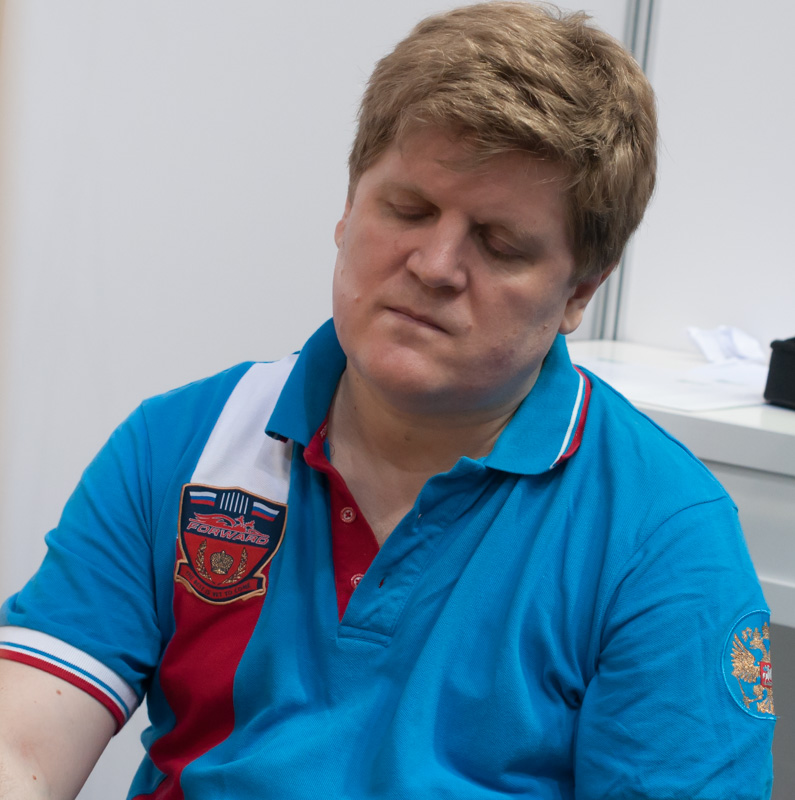
Andrew Gromov (2014)

Andrew Gromov is a Russian bridge player.

== Bridge accomplishments ==
=== Wins ===
- North American Bridge Championships (6)
  - Keohane North American Swiss Teams (1) 2009
  - Mitchell Board-a-Match Teams (3) 2000, 2009, 2010
  - Spingold (1) 2008
  - Vanderbilt (1) 2001

=== Runners-up ===
- North American Bridge Championships (4)
  - Mitchell Board-a-Match Teams (1) 2007
  - Reisinger (1) 2013
  - Roth Open Swiss Teams (1) 2012
  - Spingold (1) 2007
