= Christal Henner =

American bridge player

Christal Henner is an American bridge player and a World Life Master in the Open rankings of the World Bridge Federation. Henner finished second in the Rosenblum Cup World Championship in 2006 in Verona, Italy and won five North American Bridge Championships.

== Bridge accomplishments ==
=== Wins ===
- North American Bridge Championships (5)
  - Jacoby Open Swiss Teams (1) 2003
  - Vanderbilt (1) 2007
  - Mitchell Board-a-Match Teams (1) 2004
  - Roth Open Swiss Teams (2) 2005, 2006

=== Runners-up ===
- Rosenblum Cup (1) 2006
- North American Bridge Championships
  - Jacoby Open Swiss Teams (1) 2004
  - Reisinger (1) 2010
