= Grant Baze =

American bridge player

Grant Sheridan Baze (June 5, 1943 – January 11, 2009) was an American bridge player. As of 1994 he lived in San Francisco, California.

Baze died in 2009.

Baze was inducted into the ACBL Hall of Fame in 2012.

== Bridge accomplishments ==
=== Honors ===
- ACBL Hall of Fame, von Zedtwitz Award 2012

=== Awards ===
- Fishbein Trophy (1) 1975
- Herman Trophy (1) 1984

=== Wins ===
- North American Bridge Championships (7)
  - Jacoby Open Swiss Teams (1) 1983
  - Keohane North American Swiss Teams (1) 1984
  - Mitchell Board-a-Match Teams (2) 1983, 1998
  - Reisinger (1) 1970
  - Spingold (2) 1975, 1997

=== Runners-up ===
- North American Bridge Championships
  - Jacoby Open Swiss Teams (3) 1990, 1994, 1999
  - Mitchell Board-a-Match Teams (2) 1972, 2005
  - Reisinger (1) 1971
  - Spingold (1) 1998
