= Sam Lev =

Israeli bridge player

Sam Lev is an Israeli bridge player.

== Bridge accomplishments ==
=== Wins ===
- Cavendish Invitational Pairs (2) 1992, 2004
- North American Bridge Championships (7)
  - Senior Knockout Teams (1) 2008
  - Jacoby Open Swiss Teams (2) 1999, 2004
  - Reisinger (2) 1989, 1991
  - Vanderbilt (1) 2002
  - von Zedtwitz Life Master Pairs (1) 1999

=== Runners-up ===
- World Olympiad Seniors Teams Championship (2) 2008, 2012
- Cavendish Invitational Pairs (2) 1994, 2008
- North American Bridge Championships (11)
  - Grand National Teams (2) 2012, 2013
  - Jacoby Open Swiss Teams (1) 2013
  - Blue Ribbon Pairs (1) 1990
  - Mitchell Board-a-Match Teams (3) 2000, 2003, 2005
  - Spingold (1) 1991
  - Vanderbilt (2) 1993, 2001
  - von Zedtwitz Life Master Pairs (1) 2000
