= George Jacobs (bridge player) =

American contract bridge player

- Occupation: bridge player
- Known for: monthly columnist with the American Contract Bridge League Bulletin magazine
- Notable work: won 11 North American Bridge Championships, see Wins
- Awards: Herman Trophy (2) 2000, 2001

George Jacobs is an American bridge player, who lives in Chicago. Jacobs has won 11 North American Bridge Championships.

Jacobs is a monthly columnist with the American Contract Bridge League Bulletin magazine.

== Bridge accomplishments ==
=== Awards ===
- Herman Trophy (2) 2000, 2001

=== Wins ===
- North American Bridge Championships (11)
  - Lebhar IMP Pairs (1) 1999
  - Jacoby Open Swiss Teams (1) 2001
  - Vanderbilt (3) 1999, 2004, 2009
  - Mitchell Board-a-Match Teams (3) 2002, 2003, 2006
  - Reisinger (1) 2000
  - Spingold (2) 2001, 2002

=== Runners-up ===
- Bermuda Bowl (1) 2007
- North American Bridge Championships (6)
  - Silodor Open Pairs (1) 2005
  - Mitchell Board-a-Match Teams (1) 2001
  - Reisinger (3) 1998, 2001, 2005
  - Roth Open Swiss Teams (1) 2008
