= Tomas Brenning =

Swedish bridge player, journalist, and computer programmer

Tomas Brenning (born 1967 in Stockholm, Sweden) is a Swedish bridge player, journalist and computer programmer. Even though he has won a bronze medal in the 1994 Rosenblum Cup world championship, Brenning is better known as the creator of the bridge scoring software used by several bridge federations in Europe and for scoring the world championships of bridge. Brenning possesses the title of World Bridge Federation World International Master.
