= Phil Feldesman =

American bridge player

Philip Efraim Feldesman (June 21, 1919 – September 1, 1986) was an American bridge player.

Feldesman was born in Russia in 1919 and immigrated to New York City. He enlisted in the U.S. military in 1943 and became a naturalized citizen the next year.

== Bridge accomplishments ==
=== Awards ===
- Fishbein Trophy (1) 1967
- Herman Trophy (1) 1961
- Mott-Smith Trophy (2) 1965, 1966

=== Wins ===
- North American Bridge Championships (14)
  - Senior Masters Individual (1) 1957
  - von Zedtwitz Life Master Pairs (3) 1961, 1962, 1967
  - Wernher Open Pairs (2) 1961, 1962
  - Open Pairs (1928-1962) (1) 1961
  - Vanderbilt (2) 1965, 1966
  - Mitchell Board-a-Match Teams (3) 1962, 1963, 1966
  - Chicago Mixed Board-a-Match (1) 1973
  - Reisinger (1) 1969

=== Runners-up ===
- North American Bridge Championships
  - Silodor Open Pairs (1) 1967
  - Blue Ribbon Pairs (1) 1967
  - Vanderbilt (1) 1969
  - Mitchell Board-a-Match Teams (1) 1965
  - Reisinger (1) 1965
  - Spingold (1) 1969
