= Alexander Smirnov (bridge) =

German bridge player

- Born: Alexander Smirnov; 10 March 1982 (age 43); Saint Petersburg, RSFSR, Soviet Union
- Occupation: Bridge player
- Known for: Competitive bridge

Alexander Smirnov (born 10 March 1982 in Saint Petersburg) is a German bridge player. He has represented Germany in international competition and has won multiple national and North American titles. After achieving high-level success in the 2000s and 2010s with his long-time partner Josef Piekarek, their partnership ended in 2016 following a four-year suspension from the sport for ethical violations. Smirnov returned to competitive bridge in 2020 and has since won multiple German national championships.

== Career ==
=== Early life and early success ===
Born in Saint Petersburg, Smirnov moved to Germany in 1996. He was introduced to bridge at the age of five by his father. In his youth, he represented Germany on the Under-21 (U21) and Under-26 (U26) national teams, competing alongside partners Dennis Kraemer and Gerben Dirksen. Before his high-profile partnership with Josef Piekarek, Smirnov competed in open events with partners including Hartmut Kondoch and Dirk Schroeder.

By 2007, Smirnov had joined the "Bamberger Reiter" team, winning the German Team Bundesliga alongside teammates Michael Gromöller, Josef Piekarek, and Dr. Entscho Wladow. Smirnov and Piekarek became one of Germany's most successful pairs, winning the 5th Dr. Heinz von Rotteck Pokal in 2008.

In 2014, Smirnov and Piekarek achieved international recognition, placing 15th in the Open Pairs at the World Bridge Series in Sanya, China, the highest finish for any German pair at the tournament. That same year, Smirnov was a member of the German Open national team that finished 6th at the European Team Championships in Opatija, qualifying Germany for the Bermuda Bowl. In 2015, playing for Hanseatic BC, he finished as a runner-up in the Open German Team Championship.

=== 2016 suspension ===
In September 2015, Smirnov and Piekarek admitted to ethical violations regarding their gameplay. In 2016, the European Bridge League formally convicted them of cheating for inappropriately communicating their hands through bidding card positioning. They were sentenced to a four-year suspension and a lifetime ban from playing together as a pair, a ruling that the American Contract Bridge League (ACBL) also honored.

=== Return to competition ===
Following the expiration of his suspension in 2020, Smirnov successfully returned to the German circuit. In 2021, he took bronze at the 73rd German Team Championship with Team Delta. In 2022, he won the 73rd Open German Team Championship as a member of Team Waldsolms, alongside teammates Thomas Gotard, Florian Alter, and Sibrand van Oosten. In October 2025, Smirnov won gold at the 1st Open Pair Bundesliga with partner Wolf Stahl.

== Bridge accomplishments ==
=== Wins ===
- North American Bridge Championships (2)
  - Jacoby Open Swiss Teams (1) 2014
  - Mitchell Board-a-Match Teams (1) 2013
- German National Championships (4)
  - Open Paar Bundesliga (1) 2025 (with Wolf Stahl)
  - Offene Deutsche Teammeisterschaft (1) 2022 (with Team Waldsolms)
  - Dr. Heinz von Rotteck Pokal (1) 2008 (with Josef Piekarek)
  - German Team Bundesliga (1) 2007 (with Team Bamberger Reiter)

=== Runners-up ===
- North American Bridge Championships (3)
  - Jacoby Open Swiss Teams (1) 2013
  - Reisinger (2) 2009, 2010
- German National Championships (1)
  - Offene Deutsche Teammeisterschaft (1) 2015 (with Team Hanseatic BC)

=== Other notable finishes ===
- 6th place, European Team Championships (Open) 2014
- 15th place, World Bridge Series Open Pairs 2014
- 3rd place (Bronze), German Team Championship 2021
