= Daniel Korbel =

Canadian bridge player

Daniel Korbel is a Canadian bridge player.

== Bridge accomplishments ==
=== Wins ===
- North American Bridge Championships (3)
  - Mitchell Board-a-Match Teams (1) 2015
  - 2016 Jacoby Swiss Teams
  - Grand National Teams (1) 2019 (Championship Flight)
- Canadian National Teams Championships (CNTC) (4)
  - 2009, 2011, 2012, 2014

=== Runners-up ===
- 2012 transnational world championship
- North American Bridge Championships (4)
  - Roth Open Swiss Teams (1) 2014
  - Wernher Open Pairs (1) 2007
  - Mitchell Board-a-Match Teams (1) 2016
  - 2017 Vanderbilt KO Teams(runner up)
