= Josef Piekarek =

German bridge player

Josef Piekarek (born 16 April 1963) is a German bridge player. Besides playing Bridge he is a Physical Education Teacher.

In 2015, he and his partner Alexander Smirnov admitted to ethical violations. In 2016, the European Bridge League convicted them of cheating for inappropriately communicating their hands through bidding card positioning. They were sentenced to a four year suspension and a lifetime ban from playing together as a pair, with the ABCL honoring the sentence.

== Bridge accomplishments ==
=== Wins ===
- North American Bridge Championships (2)
  - Jacoby Open Swiss Teams (1) 2014
  - Mitchell Board-a-Match Teams (1) 2013

=== Runners-up ===
- North American Bridge Championships (3)
  - Jacoby Open Swiss Teams (1) 2013
  - Reisinger (2) 2009, 2010
