= Chuck Burger =

American bridge player (1936–2021)

Charles (Chuck) Frederick Burger (November 15, 1936 - March 25, 2021) was an American bridge player. Burger was from West Bloomfield, Michigan, and was an attorney.

== Bridge accomplishments ==
Burger was an 11-time national bridge champion and elected to the American Contract Bridge League Hall of Fame in 2020 as a recipient of the Von Zedtwitz Award.

=== Awards ===
- ACBL Hall of Fame 2020
- Herman Trophy (1) 1970

=== Wins ===
- North American Bridge Championships (11)
  - Blue Ribbon Pairs (1) 1970
  - Nail Life Master Open Pairs (1) 1969
  - Grand National Teams (1) 2005
  - Jacoby Open Swiss Teams (1) 1996
  - Mitchell Board-a-Match Teams (2) 1969, 1988
  - Reisinger (2) 1988, 1992
  - Spingold (3) 1985, 1989, 1990

=== Runners-up ===
- North American Bridge Championships
  - von Zedtwitz Life Master Pairs (2) 1969, 1973
  - Nail Life Master Open Pairs (1) 2000
  - Grand National Teams (3) 1974, 1982, 1996
  - Vanderbilt (3) 1971, 1997, 1998
  - Senior Knockout Teams (1) 2000
  - Mitchell Board-a-Match Teams (2) 1989, 1995
  - Chicago Mixed Board-a-Match (1) 1996
  - Reisinger (4) 1981, 1993, 1994, 1996
  - Spingold (2) 1994, 1997
