= Victor Mitchell (bridge) =

American bridge player

Victor Mitchell (October 21, 1923 – January 5, 1995) was an American bridge player. He was married to Jacqui Mitchell. He was inducted into the American Contract Bridge League's Hall of Fame in 1996.

== Bridge accomplishments ==
=== Honors ===
- ACBL Hall of Fame 1996
- ACBL Honorary Member 1988

=== Wins ===
- North American Bridge Championships (6)
  - Mitchell Board-a-Match Teams (2) 1962, 1963
  - Nail Life Master Open Pairs (1) 1962
  - Spingold (2) 1956, 1959
  - von Zedtwitz Life Master Pairs (1) 1965

=== Runners-up ===
- World Olympiad Teams Championship (1) 1964
- North American Bridge Championships (10)
  - Mitchell Board-a-Match Teams (2) 1965, 1988
  - Chicago Mixed Board-a-Match (1) 1989
  - Nail Life Master Open Pairs (1) 1965
  - Reisinger (1) 1955
  - Spingold (1) 1969
  - Vanderbilt (1) 1969
  - Wernher Open Pairs (1) 1955
  - von Zedtwitz Life Master Pairs (2) 1954, 1955
