= Mark Lair =

American bridge player (born 1947)

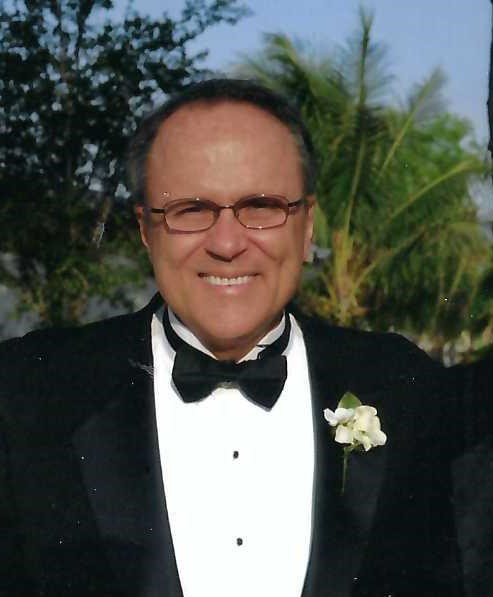

Mark Lair (born 1947) is a professional American bridge player from Canyon, Texas.

Lair is ranked 5th all-time on the American Contract Bridge League (ACBL) Top 500 listings with over 79,000 masterpoints (as of July 2026). He is an ACBL Grand Life Master and World Bridge Federation (WBF) World Life Master; he was inducted into the ACBL Hall of Fame in 2009.

== Bridge accomplishments ==
=== Honors ===
- ACBL Hall of Fame, 2009
- Honorary lifetime appointment to the ACBL Goodwill Committee, 1997

=== Awards ===
- Fishbein Trophy (1) 1986
- Barry Crane Trophy (1) 1990
- Herman Trophy (1) 1994

=== Wins ===
- World Championships (2)
  - The d'Orsi Seniors Trophy - Seniors Teams, 2015, Chennai, India
  - The Rand Cup - Seniors Teams, 2018, Orlando, FL, USA
- North American Bridge Championships (23)
  - Blue Ribbon Pairs (2) 1984, 1994
  - Reisinger (2) 1988, 1992
  - Spingold (2) 1986, 1989
  - Vanderbilt (3) 1979, 1997, 1998
  - Jacoby Open Swiss Teams (2) 1991, 2000
  - Truscott Senior Swiss Teams (1) 2008
  - Senior Knockout Teams (1) 2009
  - Keohane North American Swiss Teams (1) 1998
  - Mitchell Board-a-Match Teams (4) 1986, 1988, 1993, 2024
  - Chicago Mixed Board-a-Match (4) 1977, 1978, 1979, 1990
  - Roth Open Swiss Teams (1) 2026

=== Runners-up ===
- World Championships (1)
  - The Rand Cup - Seniors Teams, 2022, Wroclaw, Poland
- North American Bridge Championships (12)
  - Blue Ribbon Pairs (1) 1972
  - Reisinger (6) 1978, 1980, 1990, 1993, 1994, 2000
  - Spingold (1) 1994
  - Chicago Mixed Board-a-Match (2) 1984, 2005
  - Mitchell Board-a-Match Teams (1) 1995
  - Truscott Senior Swiss Teams (1) 2025
