= Ed Manfield =

American bridge player

Edward Adam Manfield (May 1, 1943 – March 29, 1999) was a professional American bridge player. He was a member of the U.S. team that won the Rosenblum Cup at the 1986 World Bridge Championships, after taking silver in 1982.

== Biography ==
Manfield was born in the Bronx, New York City, and graduated from Harvard University in 1965. After serving in the Army, he earned a master's degree from the University of Virginia in 1972. Manfield was employed at the Federal Trade Commission and later became the head of a company called Binary Traders Inc.

Manfield was married three times; his first two marriages, to Lynn Johannesen, and JoAnn Wellens (later Sprung), ended in divorce. Manfield partnered with Wellens during their marriage from 1980 to 1985. In The New York Times in 1983, Alan Truscott praised their performance along with pair Bob Fiske and Mickie Kivel, calling it, "Perhaps the best performance ever in New York by a team consisting of two mixed pairs."

He later remarried and died in 1999 of a heart attack at his home in Philadelphia. He was survived by his wife Melanie, their two children, Seth Manfield, a champion Magic: the Gathering player, and Sabrina, and his daughter from a previous marriage, Karen.

He was inducted into the ACBL Hall of Fame in 2003.

== Bridge accomplishments ==
=== Honors ===
- ACBL Hall of Fame, 2003

=== Awards ===
- Herman Trophy (1) 1986

=== Wins ===
- North American Bridge Championships (11)
  - Silodor Open Pairs (2) 1987, 1989
  - Wernher Open Pairs (1) 1985
  - Blue Ribbon Pairs (1) 1990
  - Grand National Teams (3) 1984, 1988, 1992
  - Vanderbilt (1) 1991
  - Mitchell Board-a-Match Teams (3) 1986, 1989, 1994

=== Runners-up ===
- North American Bridge Championships
  - Silodor Open Pairs (2) 1981, 1996
  - Blue Ribbon Pairs (2) 1985, 1986
  - Grand National Teams (1) 1985
  - Reisinger (1) 1980
  - Spingold (2) 1979, 1981
