= John Mohan =

American bridge player

John A. Mohan (born 1939) is an American bridge player from Santa Monica, California.

Mohan graduated from the University of Chicago.

== Bridge accomplishments ==
=== Awards ===
- ACBL Player of the Year (1) 1999
- Herman Trophy (1) 1977

=== Wins ===
- North American Bridge Championships (20)
  - von Zedtwitz Life Master Pairs (1) 1999
  - Rockwell Mixed Pairs (1) 1972
  - Blue Ribbon Pairs (1) 1999
  - Nail Life Master Open Pairs (2) 1976, 1985
  - Jacoby Open Swiss Teams (3) 1985, 1987, 1999
  - Vanderbilt (5) 1975, 1976, 1988, 1992, 2002
  - Senior Knockout Teams (1) 2003
  - Keohane North American Swiss Teams (1) 2013
  - Mitchell Board-a-Match Teams (1) 1994
  - Spingold (1) 1976

=== Runners-up ===
- North American Bridge Championships
  - von Zedtwitz Life Master Pairs (3) 1990, 2000, 2004
  - Nail Life Master Open Pairs (1) 1977
  - Vanderbilt (1) 2001
  - Mitchell Board-a-Match Teams (2) 1985, 2000
