= Jim Mahaffey =

American contract bridge player (1936–2020)

James Watson Mahaffey (November 2, 1936 – March 13, 2020) was an American bridge player.

== Personal life ==
His father was Thomas Mahaffey Jr. and he had three siblings. He was married to Mary and together they had four children, James, William, Mary and Robert and lived in Winter Park, FL. He later remarried Terry.

== Bridge accomplishments ==
=== Wins ===
- North American Bridge Championships (5)
  - Grand National Teams (1) 2004
  - Jacoby Open Swiss Teams (1) 1989
  - Mitchell Board-a-Match Teams (1) 2013
  - Chicago Mixed Board-a-Match (1) 1987
  - Spingold (1) 1988

=== Runners-up ===
- North American Bridge Championships
  - Grand National Teams (1) 2005
  - Jacoby Open Swiss Teams (1) 2013
  - Reisinger (1) 1992
  - Spingold (1) 1990
