= Andrew Goodman (bridge) =

American bridge player

Andy Goodman
- Born: Andrew Goodman; 1946 (age 79–80); Cleveland, Ohio, U.S.
- Education: Yale University
- Occupation: Money manager

Andrew "Andy" Goodman (born 1946) is an American bridge player and retired money manager. Andy has won three North American Bridge championship and finished second in two World Championships. Andy was President of Rainbow Capital from 1985 to 2018.

== Bridge accomplishments ==
=== Wins ===
- North American Bridge Championships (3)
  - Mitchell Board-a-Match Teams (1) 1994
  - Jacoby Open Swiss Teams (1) 2024
  - Vanderbilt (1) 1992
- Other North American Bridge Championships (1)
  - Digital NABC Open KO (1) 2024

=== Runners-up ===
- North American Bridge Championships (1)
  - Leventritt Silver Ribbon Pairs (1) 2023
- World Championships (2)
  - The Rand Cup - Seniors Teams, 2022, Wroclaw, Poland
  - The d'Orsi Seniors Trophy - Seniors Teams, 2023, Marrakech, Morocco

== Personal life ==
Andy has been married to Teresa "Teri" since 1977.
