= Antonio Sementa =

Italian bridge player

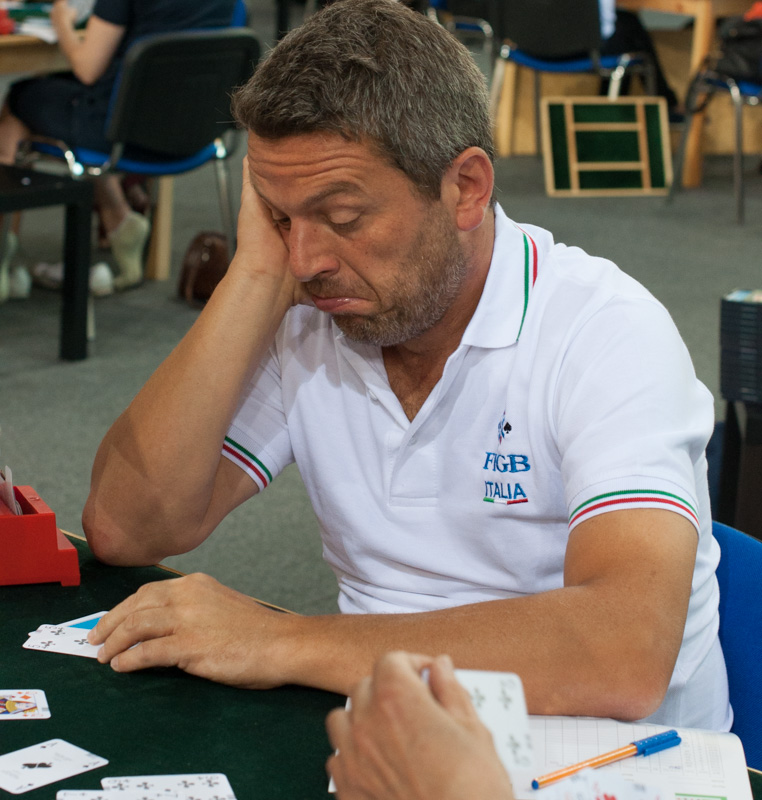
Antonio Sementa (2014)

Antonio Sementa is an Italian bridge player.

== Bridge accomplishments ==
=== Wins ===
- Bermuda Bowl (1) 2013
- Rosenblum Cup (1) 1998
- World Olympiad Teams Championship (1) 2008
- North American Bridge Championships (6)
  - Mitchell Board-a-Match Teams (1) 2011
  - Roth Open Swiss Teams (1) 2006
  - Reisinger (3) 2010, 2011, 2019
  - Vanderbilt (1) 2007

=== Runners-up ===
- Bermuda Bowl (1) 2009
- Buffett Cup (1) 2010
- North American Bridge Championships (4)
  - Jacoby Open Swiss Teams (2) 2001, 2009
  - Vanderbilt (1) 2023
  - Roth Open Swiss Teams (1) 2009
