= Howard Weinstein =

American bridge player

Howard M. Weinstein (born 1953) is an American bridge player from Chicago, Illinois. He is a graduate of University of Minnesota. He is related to Josh (J. Elvis) Weinstein from Mystery Science Theater 3000.

== Bridge accomplishments ==
=== Wins ===
- North American Bridge Championships (10)
  - von Zedtwitz Life Master Pairs (1) 1997
  - Silodor Open Pairs (1) 1996
  - Blue Ribbon Pairs (1) 1998
  - Nail Life Master Open Pairs (1) 2006
  - Grand National Teams (1) 1991
  - Vanderbilt (1) 1993
  - Mitchell Board-a-Match Teams (2) 2012, 2019
  - Reisinger (2) 1997, 2001

=== Runners-up ===
- Bermuda Bowl (1) 2007
- North American Bridge Championships
  - von Zedtwitz Life Master Pairs (3) 1988, 1989, 2007
  - Grand National Teams (2) 1986, 1988
  - Jacoby Open Swiss Teams (1) 2002
  - Mitchell Board-a-Match Teams (2) 1987, 2002
  - Reisinger (4) 1987, 1995, 2008, 2010
  - Spingold (1) 2008
