= Waleed El Ahmady =

Egyptian bridge player

Waleed El Ahmady is an Egyptian bridge player.

== Bridge accomplishments ==
=== Wins ===
- North American Bridge Championships (4)
  - Blue Ribbon Pairs (1) 2004
  - Mitchell Board-a-Match Teams (1) 2012
  - Vanderbilt (1) 2009
  - von Zedtwitz Life Master Pairs (1) 2004

=== Runners-up ===
- Cavendish Invitational Pairs (2) 2002, 2003
- North American Bridge Championships (3)
  - Chicago Mixed Board-a-Match (1) 2006
  - Roth Open Swiss Teams (1) 2008
  - von Zedtwitz Life Master Pairs (1) 2005
