= Robert Lipsitz =

American bridge player

Robert H. Lipsitz (8 October 1942 – 10 May 2020) is an American bridge player from Annandale, Virginia.

== Bridge accomplishments ==
=== Wins ===
- North American Bridge Championships (6)
  - von Zedtwitz Life Master Pairs (1) 1976
  - Nail Life Master Open Pairs (1) 1982
  - Grand National Teams (3) 1984, 1988, 1992
  - Senior Knockout Teams (1) 1999

=== Runners-up ===
- North American Bridge Championships
  - von Zedtwitz Life Master Pairs (2) 1977, 1982
  - Grand National Teams (2) 1977, 1985
  - Senior Knockout Teams (1) 2000
  - Chicago Mixed Board-a-Match (1) 1973
  - Reisinger (2) 1976, 1977
