= Dennis Bilde =

Danish bridge player

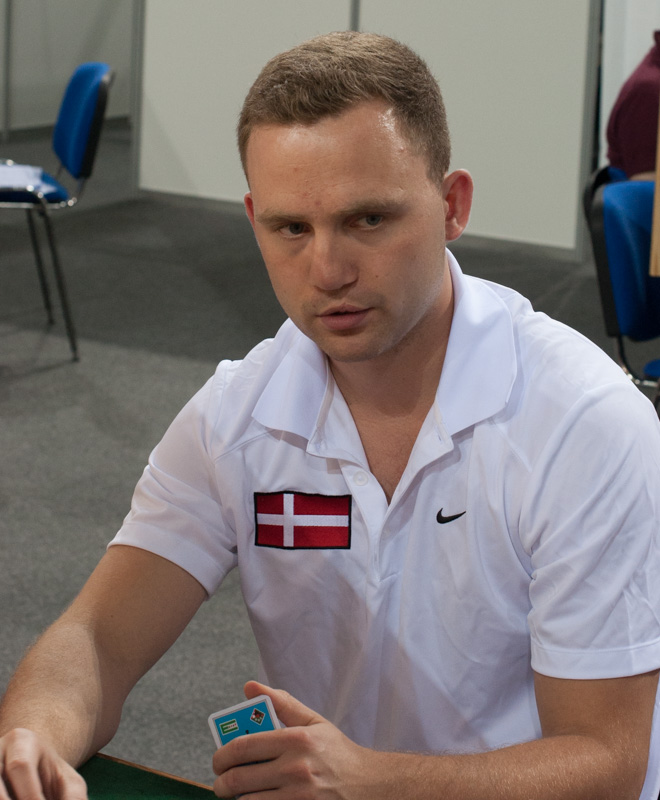
Dennis Bilde (2014)

Dennis Bilde (born 11 December 1989) is a Danish bridge player.

== Bridge accomplishments ==
=== Wins ===
- North American Bridge Championships (5)
  - Keohane North American Swiss Teams (1) 2012
  - Reisinger (1) 2019
  - Silodor Open Pairs (1) 2012
  - Vanderbilt (1) 2013
  - Norman Kay Platinum Pairs (1) 2017
  - Roth Open Swiss Teams (1) 2022
