= Lou Bluhm =

American bridge player

Louis Edward Bluhm (March 22, 1940 – April 5, 1990) was an American bridge player. He played bridge professionally and was an expert at both poker and gin rummy, according to the American Contract Bridge League (ACBL).

Bluhm, an accountant, was born in Muskegon Heights, Michigan, but lived in Atlanta, Georgia for 25 years. He attended Valparaiso University. He served in the United States Air Force during the Vietnam War and was stationed at Myrtle Beach Air Force Base, South Carolina.

He died at Williamson Medical Center in Franklin, Tennessee in 1990, at age 50.

Bluhm was inducted into the ACBL Hall of Fame in 2000. The ACBL Distinguished Player Award had been "originated for him".

== Bridge accomplishments ==
=== Honors ===
- ACBL Hall of Fame, 2000

=== Wins ===
- North American Bridge Championships (9)
  - Silodor Open Pairs (1) 1984
  - Blue Ribbon Pairs (1) 1977
  - Nail Life Master Open Pairs (1) 1987
  - Vanderbilt (2) 1979, 1989
  - Mitchell Board-a-Match Teams (1) 1977
  - Reisinger (1) 1972
  - Spingold (2) 1974, 1977

=== Runners-up ===
- North American Bridge Championships
  - Grand National Teams (1) 1983
  - Vanderbilt (2) 1978, 1986
  - Mitchell Board-a-Match Teams (3) 1973, 1983, 1987
  - Spingold (1) 1988
