= Johan Upmark =

Swedish bridge player

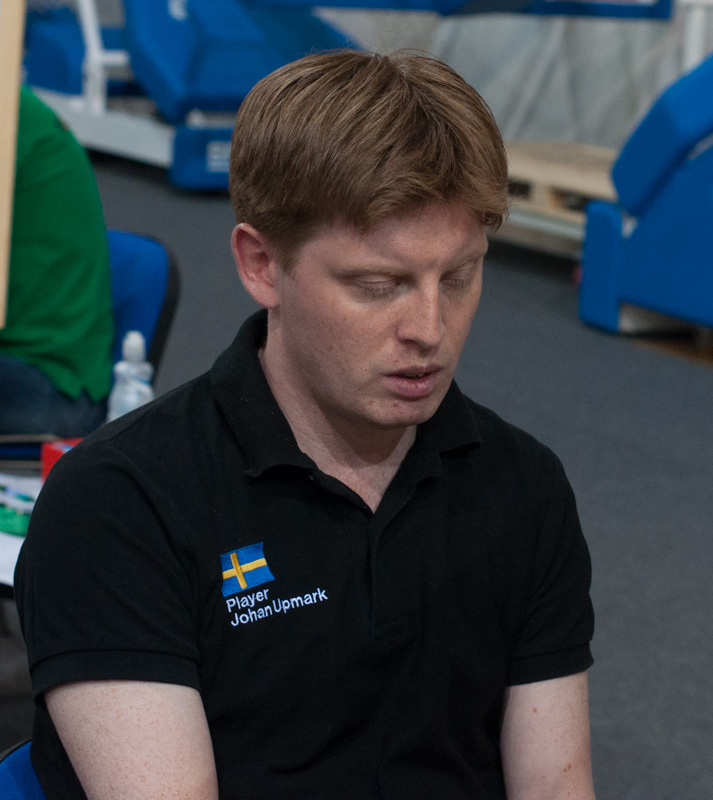

Johan Upmark is a World Champion Swedish bridge player.

== Bridge accomplishments ==
=== Wins ===
- World Bridge Games Open Team (1) 2012
- World Team Olympiad (1) 2012

=== Runners-up ===
- Bermuda Bowl (1) 2016
- European Team Championships (1) 2016

== Personal life ==
Johan has a son, Oscar, born in 2018.
