= Norberto Bocchi =

Italian bridge player (born 1961)

Norberto Bocchi (born 29 September 1961 in Parma, Italy) is an Italian bridge player. Bocchi has won five World teams championships along with six consecutive European teams championships and a seventh European in 2010. For many years his regular partner was Giorgio Duboin. After missing one European and World championship cycle (2008–2009), he returned to the Italian national team in 2010, now playing with Agustín Madala, and Italy returned to the victor stand.

In July 2010, Bocchi was the World Bridge Federation's 13th-ranked player and the European Bridge League's fourth-ranked player.

He currently lives in Barcelona, Spain.

== Wins ==
- Bermuda Bowl (2) 2005, 2013
- World Open Team Olympiad (2) 2000, 2004
- Rosenblum Cup (1) 2002
- North American Bridge Championships (9)
  - Vanderbilt (1) 2004
  - Spingold (2) 2001, 2002
  - Reisinger (2) 2000, 2019
  - Open Board-a-Match Teams (2) 2002, 2003
  - Jacoby Open Swiss Teams (1) 2001
  - Open Swiss Teams (1) 2007
- European Championships (10)
  - Open Teams (7) 1997, 1999, 2001, 2002, 2004, 2006, 2010
  - EBL Champions Cup (3) 2002, 2011, 2012
- Italian Championships (35)
  - Open Teams (10) 1986, 1991, 1996, 1997, 1998, 2000, 2001, 2002, 2004,2010
  - Open Cup (10) 1984, 1986, 1990, 1991, 1992,1997, 1998, 2000,2011,2012
  - Open Pairs (1) 1987
  - Mixed Teams (6) 1985, 1988, 1991, 2008, 2009 2012
  - Junior Teams (2) 1984, 1985
- Other notable wins:
  - Forbo-Krommenie Nations Cup (2) 1997, 2002
  - Forbo-Krommenie International Teams (3) 1997, 2001, 2002
  - White House International Top Teams (2) 2006, 2008
  - Politiken World Pairs (1) 2000
  - Generali World Masters Individual (1) 2004

== Runners-up ==
- Bermuda Bowl (1) 2003
- North American Bridge Championships (5)
  - Vanderbilt (1) 2007
  - Reisinger (2) 1999, 2001
  - Open Board-a-Match Teams (1) 2001
  - Jacoby Open Swiss Teams (1) 2006
- European Championships (3)
  - Open Pairs (1) 1999
  - Mixed Teams (1) 1992
  - Junior Teams (1) 1984
- Italian Championships (12)
  - Open Teams (7) 1992, 1993, 1994, 1995, 1999, 2005, 2007
  - Open Cup (1) 1996
  - Mixed Teams (4) 1986, 1995, 1996, 2006
- Other notable 2nd places:
  - Buffett Cup (1) 2006
  - IOC Grand Prix (1) 2000
  - Forbo-Krommenie Nations Cup (2) 2000, 2001
  - White House International Top Teams (1) 2004
  - World Bridge Series (2018)
