= Steve Garner =

American bridge player

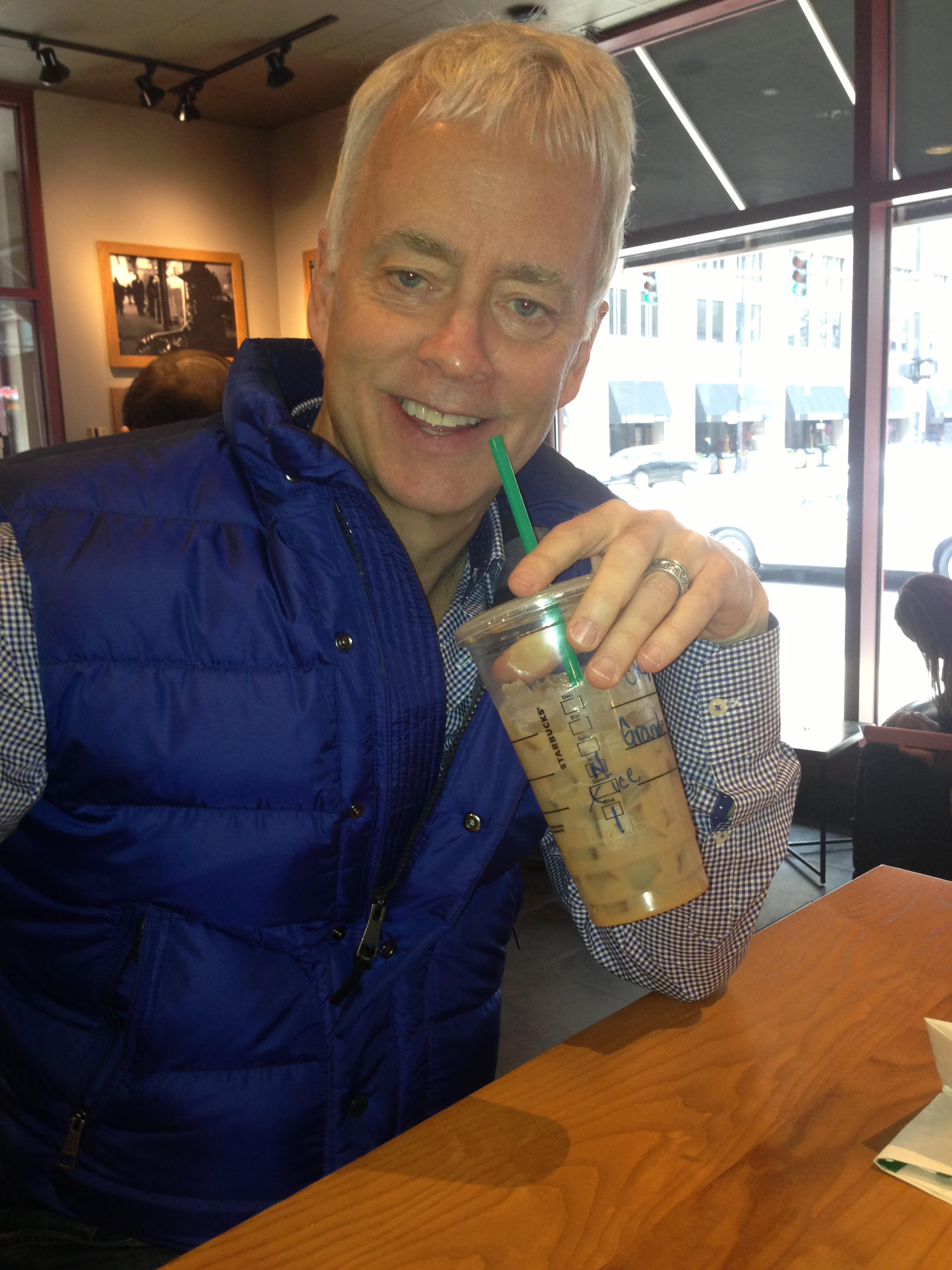

Steve Garner is a professional American bridge player. Garner has two senior world championships and has won 13 North American Bridge Championships. A native of Minneapolis, Minnesota, Steve has lived in Chicago, Illinois since 1985.

== Bridge accomplishments ==
=== Awards ===
The American Contract Bridge League Hall of Fame 2024

- Fishbein Trophy (1) 1997
- Goren Trophy (1) 2010
- Mott-Smith Trophy (1) 2019

=== Wins ===
The Rand Cup Senior World Championships (1) 2018

The d'Orsi Senior World Championships (1) 2025

- North American Bridge Championships (13)
  - Von Zedtwitz Life Master Pairs (1) 1997
  - Nail Life Master Open Pairs (2) 2000, 2006
  - Grand National Teams (2) 1991, 1995
  - Keohane North American Swiss Teams (1) 1996
  - Mitchell Board-a-Match Teams (1) 2012
  - Senior Knockout Teams (1) 2015
  - Reisinger (2) 1997, 2001
  - Vanderbilt (2) 2019, 2023
  - Spingold (1) 2025

=== Runners-up ===
- Bermuda Bowl (1) 2007
- Buffett Cup (1) 2008
- North American Bridge Championships (11)
  - Rockwell Mixed Pairs (1) 1985
  - Grand National Teams (1) 1988
  - Jacoby Open Swiss Teams (2) 2002, 2014
  - Mitchell Board-a-Match Teams (3) 1978, 1987, 2002
  - Reisinger (2) 2008, 2010
  - Spingold (1) 2008
  - Von Zedtwitz Life Masters Pairs (1) 2016
  - Vanderbilt (1) 2025
