= Franck Multon =

French bridge player

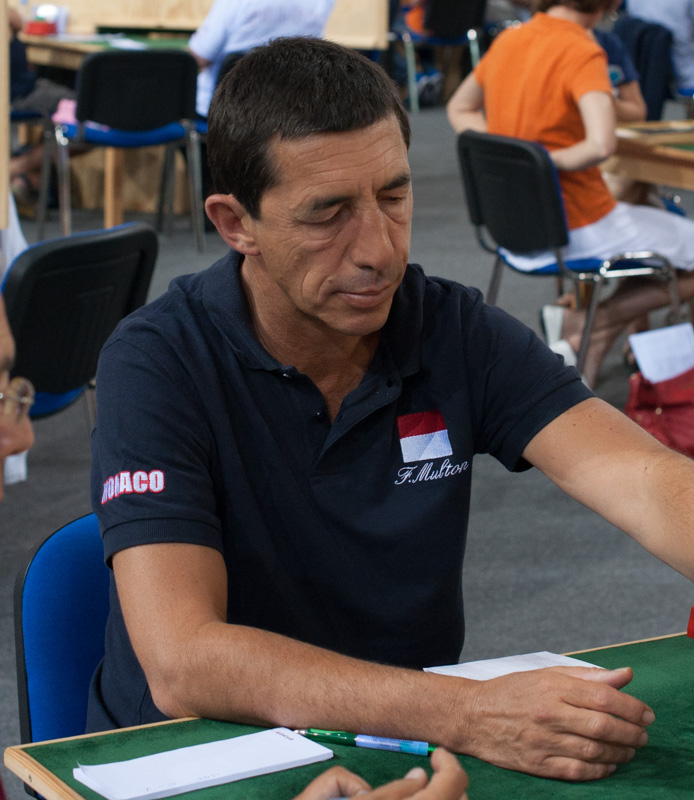
Franck Multon (2014)

Franck Multon is a French bridge player.

== Bridge accomplishments ==
=== Wins ===
- Bermuda Bowl (1) 1997
- World Transnational Open Teams Championship (2) 2007, 2009
- World Olympiad Teams Championship (1) 1996
- North American Bridge Championships (5)
  - Reisinger (2) 2012, 2013
  - Spingold (2) 2011, 2012
  - Vanderbilt (1) 2010

=== Runners-up ===
- Bermuda Bowl (1) 2013
- North American Bridge Championships (6)
  - Reisinger (1) 2011
  - Spingold (4) 2014, 2015, 2016, 2019
  - Vanderbilt (1) 2014

== Controversy at Winter Games 2020 ==
Multon was dummy with his partner Pierre Zimmermann as declarer when with three cards left to play Multon was alleged to tell his partner (in French) how to play the remaining cards. This breaks Law 43A (paragraph 1(c)) of The Laws of Duplicate Bridge 2017. The Winter Games tournament in Monaco attracted many of the world's top bridge players - the main sponsor of the tournament was the aforementioned Pierre Zimmermann.
