= Robert F. Jordan =

American bridge player

Robert Francis Jordan (October 31, 1927 – January 10, 2004) was an American bridge player. During the 1960s he played on three North America or USA open teams that were runners-up to Italy (the Blue Team) in world championships. Arthur Robinson was his regular partner on all three occasions.

Jordan was born in New York City and served briefly in the U.S. Army during World War II. Afterward he was in business "dealing cemetery lots". He lived "all his bridge-playing life in Philadelphia" but later relocated to Cincinnati, Ohio (sometime before 1994) and to Florida. Jordan married three times, and had three children.

Jordan died of lung cancer at home in West Palm Beach, Florida, in January 2004.

== Bridge accomplishments ==
=== Wins ===
- North American Bridge Championships (7)
  - Silodor Open Pairs (2) 1960, 1962
  - Vanderbilt (2) 1961, 1968
  - Chicago Mixed Board-a-Match (1) 1959
  - Reisinger (2) 1966, 1967

=== Runners-up ===
- North American Bridge Championships
  - Wernher Open Pairs (1) 1956
  - Hilliard Mixed Pairs (1) 1961
  - Vanderbilt (1) 1965
  - Reisinger (1) 1961
