= George Mittelman =

George Mittelman is a Canadian bridge player. He competed for Team Canada at the 1993 Maccabiah Games in Israel.

== Bridge accomplishments ==
=== Wins ===
- World Mixed Pairs Championship (1) 1982
- World Senior Teams Championship (1) 2002
- North American Bridge Championships (4)
  - Senior Knockout Teams (1) 2006
  - Jacoby Open Swiss Teams (1) 1995
  - Keohane North American Swiss Teams (1) 1986
  - Mitchell Board-a-Match Teams (1) 1998

=== Runners-up ===
- Bermuda Bowl (1) 1995
- North American Bridge Championships (4)
  - Senior Knockout Teams (1) 2009
  - Reisinger (2) 1978, 1982
  - Wernher Open Pairs (1) 1985
