= Eric Murray (bridge) =

Canadian contact bridge player (1928–2018)

Eric R. Murray (31 August 1928 in Hamilton, Ontario – 19 May 2018) was a Canadian contract bridge player and co-founder of the Canadian Bridge Federation (CBF). He and his long-time regular partner Sami Kehela were considered two of the best Canadian players in the history of the game. The Eric R. Murray Trophy, named in his honour, is awarded to the open team representing Canada in the quadrennial World Team Olympiad (continued after 2004 as part of the World Mind Sports Games).

Murray was one of "four young bridge experts led by Robert F. Jordan" who won the annual Vanderbilt Cup in 1961, when it was contested in a 64-team double-elimination tournament. Murray was already a Toronto lawyer; his bridge partner Charles Coon was manager of the Boston Chess Club. The same quartet tied for second in the Reisinger later that year and Coon–Murray went on to qualify for the 6-man North America team in the 1962 Bermuda Bowl, in which they finished second to Italy's Blue Team.

Between 1962 and 1974, Murray placed second in four Bermuda Bowls, three times with Kehela. Unique among world players, Murray and Kehela also represented their country as a partnership in every one of the first six World Team Olympiads, from Turin in 1960 to Valkenburg in 1980. Together they won the Life Master Men's Pairs, the Life Master Pairs, the Vanderbilt, and the Spingold Trophy three times. They were also runners-up in the American Contract Bridge League (ACBL) 1969 Blue Ribbon Pairs. It was said that the key to their successful partnership was that each thought the other the better player.

Murray and Agnes Gordon won the ACBL's premier annual Mixed Pairs tournament in 1963. Their score in the final session, 506.5 matchpoints of 650 top, or 78%, is the highest single-session score in the history of national-level ACBL pairs competition (to 2009).

In Chicago at the 1965 Nationals (thrice-annual 10-day meets now called North American Bridge Championships), Murray led a group of Canadian organizers and enthusiasts to create the Canadian Bridge Federation. Initial meetings were held in Murray's home and the organization ran its first national final in Winnipeg in September 1967.

Murray was inducted into the ACBL Hall of Fame in 2001 along with Kehela and into the CBF Hall of Fame in 2010. As part of the ACBL 75th anniversary celebration in 2012, he was ranked the 30th most influential personality in the organization history.

He lived in Toronto where he had an active law practice as a barrister and solicitor.

== Anecdote ==
During the Bermuda Bowl scandal of 1975 when two Italian players were caught passing information by tapping toes, Murray sent a telegram to the USA team saying he was available to play as an expert player. And he noted, "I wear a size 13 shoe."

Murray was an expert witness in a criminal case involving whether bridge was a game of chance or skill. The Court of Appeal for Ontario (the province's highest court) stated of Mr. Murray: “His qualifications as an expert on the game of bridge are impressive.” In referring to this statement, Justice Spence of the Supreme Court of Canada found "that description may be said to be, at any rate, not put too strongly."

== Bridge accomplishments ==
=== Honours ===
- ACBL Hall of Fame, 2001
- Canadian Bridge Federation Hall of Fame, 2010

=== Wins ===
- North American Bridge Championships (14)
  - von Zedtwitz Life Master Pairs (1) 1969
  - Rockwell Mixed Pairs (1) 1963
  - Wernher Open Pairs (2) 1954, 1955
  - Nail Life Master Open Pairs (1) 1963
  - Vanderbilt (2) 1961, 1970
  - Marcus Cup (1) 1959
  - Mitchell Board-a-Match Teams (1) 1962
  - Chicago Mixed Board-a-Match (2) 1956, 1962
  - Spingold (3) 1964, 1965, 1968

=== Runners-up ===
- North American Bridge Championships
  - Wernher Open Pairs (1) 1965
  - Blue Ribbon Pairs (1) 1969
  - Chicago Mixed Board-a-Match (1) 1955
  - Reisinger (3) 1961, 1969, 1972
