= Giorgio Duboin =

Italian professional bridge player

Giorgio Duboin (born 30 September 1959 in Turin, Italy) is an Italian professional bridge player. He has won four world team championships along with six consecutive European team championships and a seventh European in 2010. For many years, his regular partner was Norberto Bocchi; now he plays primarily with Antonio Sementa.

As of April 2011, Duboin ranks number 3 among Open World Grand Masters, and he has been number one.

== Bridge accomplishments ==
=== Honours ===
- Sidney H. Lazard Jr. Sportsmanship Award 2008 - Ironic

=== Awards ===
- C & R Motors Award (The Best Played Hand of the Year) 2008
- Gidwani Family Trust Award (The Best Defence of the Year) 2007

=== Wins ===
- Bermuda Bowl (1) 2005
- World Open Team Olympiad (2) 2000, 2004
- World Mind Sports Games (1) 2008 — successor to the quadrennial Olympiad
- Rosenblum Cup (1) 2002
- North American Bridge Championships (10)
  - Vanderbilt (1) 2004
  - Spingold (2) 2001, 2002
  - Reisinger (2) 2000, 2019
  - Open Board-a-Match Teams (2) 2002, 2003
  - Jacoby Open Swiss Teams (1) 2001
  - Open Swiss Teams (1) 2007
  - Open Pairs I (1) 2007
- European Championships (10)
  - Open Teams (7) 1997, 1999, 2001, 2002, 2004, 2006, 2010
  - EBL Champions' Cup (1) 2002
  - Mixed Teams (1) 2002
  - Junior Pairs (1) 1980
- European Union/European Community Bridge League (5)
  - Open Teams (1) 1983
  - Open Pairs (3) 1985, 1987, 1996
  - Junior Teams (1) 1979
- Italian Championships (22)
  - Open Teams (10) 1982, 1987, 1991, 1996, 1997, 1998, 2000, 2001, 2002, 2004
  - Open Cup (6) 1983, 1990, 1991, 1997, 1998, 2000
  - Club Teams Championships (2) 2004, 2007
  - Mixed Teams (2) 1980, 2008
  - Junior Teams (2) 1978, 1984
- Other notable wins:
  - Forbo-Krommenie Nations Cup (1) 2002
  - Forbo-Krommenie International Teams (2) 2001, 2002
  - White House International Top Teams (2) 2006, 2008
  - Politiken World Pairs (1) 2000

=== Runners-up ===
- Bermuda Bowl (2) 2003, 2009
- North American Bridge Championships (7)
  - Vanderbilt (2) 2007, 2023
  - Reisinger (2) 1999, 2001
  - Open Board-a-Match Teams (1) 2001
  - Jacoby Open Swiss Teams (2) 2006, 2009
- European Championships (2)
  - Open Pairs (1) 1999
  - Junior Teams (1) 1984
- European Union/European Community Bridge League (1)
  - Open Teams (1) 1996
- Italian Championships (18)
  - Open Teams (9) 1984, 1992, 1993, 1994, 1995, 1999, 2005, 2007, 2009
  - Open Cup (2) 1989, 1996
  - Club Teams Championships (3) 2005, 2006, 2008
  - Mixed Teams (3) 1995, 1996, 2006
  - Junior Teams (1) 1982
- Other notable 2nd places:
  - Buffett Cup (1) 2006
  - IOC Grand Prix (1) 2000
  - Forbo-Krommenie Nations Cup (2) 2000, 2001
  - White House International Top Teams (1) 2004
