= Eric Greco =

American bridge player (born 1975)

Eric Alan Greco (born 1975) is an American bridge player. He is from Annandale, Virginia.

== Bridge accomplishments ==
=== Awards ===
- ACBL King or Queen of Bridge (1) 1993

=== Wins ===
- North American Bridge Championships (20)
  - von Zedtwitz Life Master Pairs (2) 1998, 2019
  - Silodor Open Pairs (1) 1997
  - Wernher Open Pairs (2) 2002, 2003
  - Nail Life Master Open Pairs (1) 2002
  - Jacoby Open Swiss Teams (1) 2010
  - Roth Open Swiss Teams (3) 2007, 2012, 2015
  - Reisinger (2) 2003, 2021
  - Spingold (2) 2005, 2010
  - Mitchell Board-a-Match Teams (1) 2018
  - Vanderbilt Trophy (1) 2018
  - Norman Kay Platinum Pairs (1) 2016
  - Edgar Kaplan Blue Ribbon Pairs (1) 2017
- ACBL Player of the Year (2) 2016, 2018

=== Runners-up ===
- North American Bridge Championships (11)
  - von Zedtwitz Life Master Pairs (2) 2008, 2022
  - Blue Ribbon Pairs (3) 2003, 2012, 2016
  - Jacoby Open Swiss Teams (1) 2003
  - Vanderbilt (4) 2007, 2009, 2012, 2015
  - Keohane North American Swiss Teams (1) 2002
