= Adam Żmudziński =

Polish bridge player (born 1956)

Adam Artur Żmudziński (born 18 January 1956) is a Polish bridge player. After 2014 competition, he ranked 22nd among Grand Masters by World Bridge Federation (WBF) masterpoints, five places behind his longtime partner Cezary Balicki. They ranked 26–27th among more than 100 all-time Grand Masters by placing points that do not decay over time. (Note: Masterpoints are awarded to more of the high finishers in more events. Balicki and Żmudziński have earned all of their placing points together, beginning with the 1989 European Bridge League national teams championship and the 1989 Bermuda Bowl, when Poland won EBL gold and WBF bronze medals. They have earned most but not all of their masterpoints as partners, beginning with the 1988 Olympiad and its consolation event, where Poland (9th and 2nd places) lost in the round-of-16 and the consolation final. Select their WBF Codes from the display of Open Grand Masters.)

Żmudziński won the World Transnational Open Teams in 2000 and 2009, European Open Teams in 1989 and 1993 as well as the London Sunday Times Invitational Pairs in 1994. His team finished second in the 2000 World Team Olympiad, 1991 Bermuda Bowl and 1994 Rosenblum Cup. With his regular partner, Cezary Balicki, won the bronze medal at the World Open Pairs held in Geneva in 1990.

On 26 September 2015, the World Bridge Federation Credentials Committee announced that the invitation extended to Balicki and Żmudziński to play in the 2015 Bermuda Bowl in Chennai, India had been withdrawn, one day before play was due to start. No reason was given.

On 22 June 2017, the Disciplinary Department of the Polish Bridge Federation (PZBS) recognised as an indisputable fact that Balicki and Żmudziński engaged in illegal transmission of information during the European Bridge League Championship in Opatija in 2014. The disciplinary department did not impose any penalties due to the expiry of the limitation period.

== Bridge accomplishments ==
=== Wins ===
- North American Bridge Championships (13)
  - Roth Open Swiss Teams (1) 2013
  - Vanderbilt (2) 2001, 2007
  - Keohane North American Swiss Teams (2) 2009, 2014
  - Mitchell Board-a-Match Teams (4) 2000, 2005, 2009, 2010
  - Roth Open Swiss Teams (1) 2006
  - Spingold (3) 1997, 2003, 2008

=== Runners-up ===
- North American Bridge Championships (11)
  - Jacoby Open Swiss Teams (1) 1999
  - Roth Open Swiss Teams (1) 2012
  - Vanderbilt (1) 2006
  - Senior Knockout Teams (2) 2013, 2014
  - Mitchell Board-a-Match Teams (2) 2004, 2007
  - Reisinger (2) 1997, 2003
  - Spingold (2) 1998, 2007
