= Lorenzo Lauria =

Italian international bridge player (born 1947)

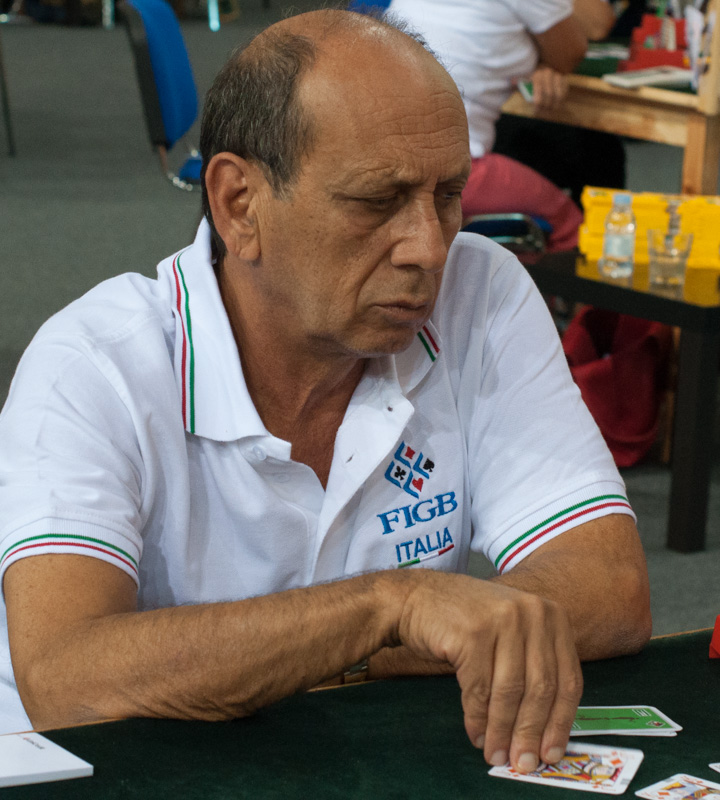
Lorenzo Lauria (2014)

Lorenzo Lauria (born July 17, 1947 ) is an Italian international bridge player. He is a six-time world champion and a World Grand Master of the World Bridge Federation (WBF). As of July 2014 he ranks fifth among Open World Grand Masters and his regular partner Alfredo Versace ranks fourth.

== Major bridge tournament wins ==
- Bermuda Bowl 2005, 2013
- European Team Championships:1979, 1995, 1997, 2001, 2002, 2004, 2006, 2010
- World Open Teams: 1998, 2002
- Grand Prix Open Teams : 1999
- World Team Olympiad: 2000, 2004
- European Champions' Cup for Open Teams: 2003, 2004, 2005, 2007, 2008, 2009
- World Mind Sports Games: Open Teams 2008 — successor to the quadrennial Olympiad
- North American Bridge Championships (12)
  - Jacoby Open Swiss Teams (1) 2001
  - Vanderbilt (2) 1999, 2004
  - Mitchell Board-a-Match Teams (3) 2002, 2003, 2011
  - Reisinger (4) 2000, 2007, 2010, 2011
  - Spingold (3) 2001, 2002, 2015

=== Runners-up ===
- North American Bridge Championships
  - Mitchell Board-a-Match Teams (1) 2001
  - Reisinger (3) 1998, 2001, 2005
  - Spingold (1) 2006
