= Reisinger =

North American contract bridge tournament

The Reisinger national bridge championship is held at the fall American Contract Bridge League (ACBL) North American Bridge Championship (NABC).

The Reisinger is a board-a-match event.

== History ==
The event is contested for the Reisinger Trophy (the Chicago Trophy until 1965). It is a six-session open team-of-four event scored by board-a-match with two qualifying sessions, two semifinal sessions and two final sessions. It was contested as a four-session championship until 1966.

The event began in 1929 as the North American Open Team Championship and the prize was the Chicago Trophy, donated by the Auction Bridge Club of Chicago. (In 1928, the open team competition was for the Harold S. Vanderbilt Cup.)

The Chicago Trophy was replaced in 1965 by the Reisinger Memorial Trophy, donated by the Greater New York Bridge Association in memory of Curt H. Reisinger. Reisinger (1891–1964), from New York City, was a principal patron of contract bridge and the American Contract Bridge League in the early years of both; he was a great-grandson of Anheuser and a grandson of Busch, co-founders of the brewery from which he inherited great wealth. That wealth enabled him to become a stalwart financial supporter of the game, as well as a noted philanthropist on a larger scale.

== Winners ==
Board-a-match scoring generates many ties in the standings for each session and several ties after three days play. The Vanderbilt Cup was inaugurated one year before the Chicago Trophy and contested at board-a-match scoring that year, with a tie result. As the Chicago or the Reisinger since then (see table), there have been six ties for first place including a 3-way tie in 1947 and a 4-way in 1984.

Numerous champion teams have defended their titles successfully without change in personnel (intact). The four-person 1937 and 1938 champions added B. Jay Becker in 1939 and won again; one foursome including Becker won in 1942 and 1943, another won in 1953 and 1954—and 1956. For the Reisinger Trophy since 1966, there have been intact repeats in 1975, 1979 with a tie, 1994–95, 1999, 2005, 2011, and 2013. The one intact three-year winner, from 1993 to 1995, was Nick Nickell's professional team: Nickell, Richard Freeman, Bob Hamman, Bobby Wolff, Jeff Meckstroth, Eric Rodwell. It also won four Spingolds from 1993 to 1996 intact (another unique string) and the 1995 world championship Bermuda Bowl representing the United States. After one personnel change, Nickell was a double winner again in 2004–05, and a winner in 2008–09 across one change owing to death.

Chicago Trophy board-a-match teams (1929–1965)
Year	Winners	Runners-Up
1929	Max M. Cohen, Louis J. Haddad, Robert W. Halpin, Nils M. Wester	Carlton R. Drake, James Kelly, Paul D. Parcells, Charles Rilling
1930	William K. Barrett, W. James Carpenter, Ely Culbertson, Johnny Rau	Mary Clement, Dorothy Rice Sims, P. Hal Sims, Waldemar von Zedtwitz
1931	Elizabeth Banfield, Winfield S. Liggett, Frances Newman, George Unger	David Burnstine, Oswald Jacoby, Willard Karn, P. Hal Sims
1932	B. Jay Becker, S. Garton Churchill, George Reith, Waldemar von Zedtwitz	Ely Culbertson, Michael T. Gottlieb, Oswald Jacoby, Theodore Lightner
1933	Charles A. Hall, Albert Steiner, Philip Steiner, Richard M. Wildberg	B. Jay Becker, S. Garton Churchill, P. Hal Sims, Waldemar von Zedtwitz
1934	Henry S. Dinkelspiel Jr., Lewis Jaeger, Bernard Rabinowitz, Maurice Seiler	Theodore Lightner, Merwyn Maier, Jean P. Mattheys, Sherman Stearns
1935	F. Roland Buck, Joseph E. Cain, Lawrence J. Welch, Edson T. Wood	Ely Culbertson, Josephine Culbertson, Richard L. Frey, Albert H. Morehead
1936	Marge Anderson, Donald G. Farquharson, Mrs. J. A. Faulkner, Percy Sheardown	Arthur Glatt, Laura Heiner, John R. Smith, Albert Weiss
1937	John R. Crawford, Charles Goren, Charles J. Solomon, Sally Young	Oscar J. Brotman, William Perry, Al Roth, S. S. Vorzimer
1938	John R. Crawford, Charles Goren, Charles J. Solomon, Sally Young	A. Mitchell Barnes, Mary Clement, Benedict Jarmel, Waldemar von Zedtwitz
1939	B. Jay Becker, John R. Crawford, Charles Goren, Charles J. Solomon, Sally Young	2/4. Jay Cushing, Seymour Kaplan, Al Leibowitz, Edward N. Marcus; 2/4. Oswald Jacoby, Merwyn Maier, Robert A. McPherran, Waldemar von Zedtwitz; 2/4. Henry Auslander, Joseph Davis, Jacob D. Lindy, Catherine W. Samberg
1940	Harry Feinberg, Jeff Glick, Maury J. Glick, Louis Newman	Alfred R. Dick, C. William Potts, James Sheern, Edward R. Thomas
1941	Peter Leventritt, Simon Rossant, Helen Sobel, Margaret Wagar	A. Mitchell Barnes, S. Garton Churchill, Lee Hazen, Charles S. Lochridge, Waldemar von Zedtwitz
1942	B. Jay Becker, Charles Goren, Sidney Silodor, John R. Crawford	S. Garton Churchill, Harry Fishbein, Lee Hazen, Waldemar von Zedtwitz
1943	B. Jay Becker, Charles Goren, Sidney Silodor, Helen Sobel	Samuel Katz, Bertram Lebhar Jr., Peter Leventritt, Simon Rossant
1944	Simon Becker, Peggy Golder, Ruth Sherman, Charles J. Solomon	B. Jay Becker, Charles Goren, Sidney Silodor, Helen Sobel
1945	Lee Hazen, George Rapée, Sam Stayman, Waldemar von Zedtwitz	Ambrose Casner, Harold Harkavy, Ralph Hirschberg, Harold A. Ogust, Jack Shore
1946	A. Mitchell Barnes, John R. Crawford, Al Roth, Edith Seligman	Simon Becker, Stanley O. Fenkel, Fred D. Karpin, Louis Newman
1947	1–3. Paula Bacher, Jane Jaeger, Kay Rhodes, Sally Young; 1-3. John R. Crawford, Theodore Lightner, George Rapée, Sam Stayman; 1-3. Robert Appleyard, Morris Berliant, Malcolm A. Lightman, Simon Rossant	
1948	George Boeckh, Bruce Elliott, Agnes Gordon, Charlotte Sidway	John R. Crawford, George Rapée, Sidney Silodor, Sam Stayman
1949	Lee Hazen, Larry Hirsch, Richard Kahn, Peter Leventritt, Jack Shore	2/3. Sidney Aronson, Emily Folline, Benjamin O. Johnson, Ludwig J. Kabakjian, Edward N. Marcus; 2/3. Jeff Glick, Arthur S. Goldsmith, Alvin Landy, Sol Mogal, Elmer I. Schwartz
1950	B. Jay Becker, Myron F. Field, Charles Goren, Sidney Silodor, Helen Sobel	John R. Crawford, George Rapée, Edward N. Marcus, Howard Schenken, Sam Stayman
1951	Corti Boland, Bruce Elliott, Micky M. Miller, Percy Sheardown	B. Jay Becker, Charles Goren, Myron F. Field, Sidney Silodor, Helen Sobel
1952	Harold Harkavy, Edith Kemp, Al Roth, Tobias Stone	Edward H. Cohen, Jeff Glick, Arthur S. Goldsmith, Elmer I. Schwartz
1953	B. Jay Becker, John R. Crawford, George Rapée, Sam Stayman	Harry Fishbein, Peter Leventritt, Ruth Sherman, Charles J. Solomon, Peggy Solomon
1954	B. Jay Becker, John R. Crawford, George Rapée, Sidney Silodor	Israel Cohen, Paul Kibler, Al Roth, William Seamon
1955	Ben Fain, George Heath, Paul Hodge, Jim Jacoby, Oswald Jacoby	William V. Lipton, Victor Mitchell, W. Miller Nelson, Joseph G. Ripstra
1956	B. Jay Becker, John R. Crawford, George Rapée, Sidney Silodor	Ben Fain, Paul Hodge, Oswald Jacoby, Dick Sutton
1957	Charles Goren, Harold Ogust, Bill Root, Howard Schenken, Helen Sobel	Robert Y. Barrett, Ben Fain, Harry Fishbein, John Gerber, Paul Hodge
1958	Leonard B. Harmon, Ralph Hirschberg, Edgar Kaplan, Alfred Sheinwold, Ivar Stakgold	Arthur M. Miller, John H. Moran, David Strasberg, Jay Wendt
1959	Lew Mathe, Donald A. Oakie, Meyer Schleifer, Edward O. Taylor	Harry Fishbein, John Gerber, Paul Hodge, Charles J. Solomon
1960	Ollie Adams, William Hanna, Sidney Lazard, Lew Mathe	Oswald Jacoby, Mervin Key, Bobby Nail, Curtis Smith
1961	John R. Crawford, Norman Kay, Al Roth, Sidney Silodor, Tobias Stone	2/3. Charles Coon, Robert F. Jordan, Eric Murray, Arthur G. Robinson; 2/3. Harold B. Guiver, Carol Sanders, Tommy Sanders, Michael Shuman
1962	1/2. Paul Allinger, Harold B. Guiver, Lew Mathe, Ron Von der Porten, Erik Paulsen, Edward O. Taylor; 1/2. Bob Hamman, Eddie Kantar, Donald P. Krauss, Marshall Miles	
1963	Charles Goren, Boris Koytchou, Peter Leventritt, Harold Ogust, Howard Schenken	Donald R. Faskow, Bill Flannery, Herbert Sachs, Paul Swanson
1964	John Gerber, Paul Hodge, Mervin Key, Harold Rockaway	Harold Harkavy, Edith Kemp, Cliff Russell, Curtis Smith, Bobby Wolff, Waldemar von Zedtwitz
1965	Eddie Kantar, Mike Lawrence, Marshall Miles, Lew Stansby	Michael Engel, Phil Feldesman, Richard Freeman, Ira Rubin

Reisinger Trophy board-a-match teams, 1966 to present
Year	Winners	Runners-Up
1966	Robert F. Jordan, Edgar Kaplan, Norman Kay, Arthur G. Robinson	2/3. Gerald W. Bare, Harold B. Guiver, Lew Mathe, Mike McMahan, Erik Paulsen, Hugh Ross; 2/3. Bill Root, Al Roth, Bee Schenken, Howard Schenken
1967	Robert F. Jordan, Edgar Kaplan, Norman Kay, Arthur G. Robinson, Bill Root, Al Roth	Steve Altman, Mike Becker, Charles Peres, Daniel Rotman
1968	Kyle Larsen, Erik Paulsen, Peter Pender, Hugh Ross, Howard Schenken	Billy Eisenberg, Bobby Goldman, Bob Hamman, Eddie Kantar, Sidney Lazard, George Rapée
1969	Philip Feldesman, William Grieve, Ira Rubin, Jeff Westheimer	Edgar Kaplan, Norman Kay, Sami Kehela, Sidney Lazard, Eric Murray, George Rapée
1970	1/2. Billy Eisenberg, Bobby Goldman, Bob Hamman, Jim Jacoby, Mike Lawrence, Bobby Wolff 1/2. Grant Baze, Anthony Dionisi, William Grieve, Harlow Lewis, Peter Pender, George Rapée	
1971	William Grieve, Edgar Kaplan, Norman Kay, Donald P. Krauss, Lew Mathe, George Rapée	Grant Baze, Anthony Dionisi, Harlow Lewis, Peter Pender
1972	Lou Bluhm, Steve Goldberg, Steven J. Parker, Steve Robinson	William Grieve, Sami Kehela, Eric Murray, George Rapée
1973	Larry T. Cohen, Richard H. Katz, Bud Reinhold, Alan Sontag, Peter Weichsel	Jack Blair, Byron L. Greenberg, Tommy Sanders, Paul Swanson
1974	Fred Hamilton, Erik Paulsen, Hugh Ross, Ira Rubin	Stephen Goldstein, Marc Jacobus, Jay Merrill, Steve Sion, Judi Solodar
1975	Fred Hamilton, Erik Paulsen, Hugh Ross, Ira Rubin	Richard Doughty, Frank Hoadley, Jack LaNoue, Sidney Lazard
1976	Malcolm Brachman, Billy Eisenberg, Bobby Goldman, Eddie Kantar, Mike Passell, Paul Soloway	Matt Granovetter, Robert Lipsitz, Steven J. Parker, Sam Stayman
1977	Jimmy Cayne, Alan C. Greenberg, Jim Jacoby, Kyle Larsen, Mike Lawrence	Matt Granovetter, Robert Lipsitz, Neil Silverman, Sam Stayman
1978	Fred Hamilton, Bob Hamman, Ira Rubin, Bobby Wolff; Ira Corn (npc)	Allan Graves, Gaylor Kasle, Mark Lair, George Mittelman, Barney O'Malia, Ron Smith
1979	1/2. Russ Arnold, Bobby Levin, Jeff Meckstroth, Bud Reinhold, Eric Rodwell; 1/2. Fred Hamilton, Bob Hamman, Ira Rubin, Bobby Wolff; Ira Corn (npc)	
1980	Ron Andersen, Malcolm Brachman, Bobby Goldman, Eddie Kantar, Mike Lawrence, Paul Soloway	2/3. Mark Lair, Jeff Meckstroth, Mike Passell, Eric Rodwell, George Rosenkranz, Eddie Wold; 2/3. Roy Fox, Ed Manfield, Paul Swanson, Kit Woolsey
1981	Chip Martel, Peter Pender, Hugh Ross, Lew Stansby	2/3. Roger Bates, Chuck Burger, Jimmy Cayne, Billy Eisenberg, Alan C. Greenberg; 2/3. Evan Bailey, L. Andrew Campbell, Joel Hoersch, David J. Weiss
1982	Bill Root, Richard Pavlicek, Edgar Kaplan, Norman Kay	Mark Molson, Eric Kokish, Paul Lewis, Robert Lebi, George Mittelman, Drew Cannell
1983	Oswald Jacoby, Edgar Kaplan, Norman Kay, Bill Root, Richard Pavlicek	2/3. Ron Rubin, Mike Becker, Billy Eisenberg, Eddie Kantar, Mike Lawrence, Peter Weichsel; 2/3. Chip Martel, Lew Stansby, Peter Pender, Hugh Ross
1984	1/4. Bill Root, Richard Pavlicek, Edgar Kaplan, Norman Kay; 1/4. Fred Stewart, Steve Weinstein, Allan Stauber, Mike Smolen; 1/4. Sam Stayman, Richard Reisig, George Tornay, Saul Bronstein; 1/4. Jim Robison, Jon Wittes, Ross Grabel, Stelios Touchtidis	
1985	1/2. Chip Martel, Peter Pender, Hugh Ross, Lew Stansby; 1/2. George Rosenkranz, Eddie Wold, Jeff Meckstroth, Eric Rodwell, Marty Bergen, Larry N. Cohen	
1986	Steve Robinson, Chip Martel, Hugh Ross, Peter Boyd, Peter Pender, Lew Stansby	Bud Reinhold, Ron Andersen, Tommy Sanders, Paul Soloway, Bobby Goldman
1987	Zia Mahmood, Jaggy Shivdasani, Billy Cohen, Ron Smith	Walter Johnson, Mark Cohen, Ralph Katz, Bill Pollack, David Berkowitz, Howard Weinstein
1988	Jimmy Cayne, Chuck Burger, Bob Hamman, Mike Passell, Mark Lair, Bobby Wolff	Tom Fox, Dick Melson, Jim Hall, David Lehman
1989	Zia Mahmood, Michael Rosenberg, Sam Lev, Chris Compton, Mark Molson	Jill Blanchard, Robert Blanchard, Jon Greenspan, Kerri Shuman, Margie Gwozdzinsky, Glenn Eisenstein
1990	Richard Pavlicek, Bill Root, Edgar Kaplan, Norman Kay, Brian Glubok	Malcolm Brachman, Mike Passell, Bobby Goldman, Paul Soloway, Mark Lair, Eddie Wold
1991	Cliff Russell, Sam Lev, David Berkowitz, Larry N. Cohen, Marty Bergen, Björn Fallenius	Mike Cappelletti Jr., Mike Cappelletti Sr., Lawrence Hicks, Rob Crawford
1992	Jimmy Cayne, Chuck Burger, Gabriel Chagas, Marcelo Branco, Mark Lair, Mike Passell	Jim Mahaffey, Alan Sontag, Eddie Kantar, Ron Andersen, Tony Forrester
1993	Nick Nickell, Richard Freeman, Bob Hamman, Bobby Wolff, Jeff Meckstroth, Eric Rodwell	Jimmy Cayne, Chuck Burger, Bobby Goldman, Paul Soloway, Mark Lair, Mike Passell
1994	Nick Nickell, Richard Freeman, Bob Hamman, Bobby Wolff, Jeff Meckstroth, Eric Rodwell	Jimmy Cayne, Chuck Burger, Bobby Goldman, Paul Soloway, Mark Lair, Mike Passell
1995	Nick Nickell, Richard Freeman, Bob Hamman, Bobby Wolff, Jeff Meckstroth, Eric Rodwell	Peter Nagy, Bruce Ferguson, Howard Weinstein, Ralph Katz, Fred Stewart, Steve Weinstein
1996	Zia Mahmood, Michael Rosenberg, Chip Martel, Lew Stansby	Jimmy Cayne, Chuck Burger, Mark Feldman, Michael Seamon, Mike Passell, Alan Sontag
1997	Bart Bramley, Howard Weinstein, Sidney Lazard, Steve Garner	George Rosenkranz, Eddie Wold, Marek Szymanowski, Marcin Leśniewski, Cezary Balicki, Adam Żmudziński
1998	Rita Shugart, Andrew Robson, Geir Helgemo, Tony Forrester	George Jacobs, Ralph Katz, Lorenzo Lauria, Alfredo Versace, Peter Weichsel, Alan Sontag
1999	Rita Shugart, Andrew Robson, Geir Helgemo, Tony Forrester	Norberto Bocchi, Giorgio Duboin, Dano De Falco, Guido Ferraro
2000	George Jacobs, Ralph Katz, Norberto Bocchi, Giorgio Duboin, Lorenzo Lauria, Alfredo Versace	Mike Cappelletti Jr., Gary Cohler, Richard Finberg, Mark Lair, Jerry Goldfein
2001	Roy Welland, Björn Fallenius, Brad Moss, Fred Gitelman, Steve Garner, Howard Weinstein	George Jacobs, Ralph Katz, Norberto Bocchi, Giorgio Duboin, Lorenzo Lauria, Alfredo Versace
2002	Steve Landen, Dan Morse, Bobby Wolff, Pratap Rajadhyaksha, Doug Doub, Adam Wildavsky	Richard Schwartz, Mike Becker, David Berkowitz, Larry N. Cohen, Zia Mahmood, Michael Rosenberg
2003	Malcolm Brachman, Eric Greco, Geoff Hampson, Mike Passell, Eddie Wold	Roy Welland, Björn Fallenius, Zia Mahmood, Michael Rosenberg, Cezary Balicki, Adam Żmudziński
2004	Nick Nickell, Richard Freeman, Bob Hamman, Paul Soloway, Jeff Meckstroth, Eric Rodwell	Richard Schwartz, Mike Becker, Andrea Buratti, Massimo Lanzarotti, David Berkowitz, Larry N. Cohen
2005	Nick Nickell, Richard Freeman, Bob Hamman, Paul Soloway, Jeff Meckstroth, Eric Rodwell	George Jacobs, Ralph Katz, Lorenzo Lauria, Alfredo Versace, Zia Mahmood, Michael Rosenberg
2006	Gary Cohler, Joe Grue, Curtis Cheek, Jacek Pszczoła	Russ Ekeblad, Chip Martel, Lew Stansby, Fred Gitelman, Brad Moss
2007	Jimmy Cayne, Michael Seamon, Lorenzo Lauria, Alfredo Versace, Fulvio Fantoni, Claudio Nunes; Charlie Weed (npc)	Aubrey Strul, Mike Becker, David Berkowitz, Larry N. Cohen, Chip Martel, Lew Stansby
2008	Nick Nickell, Richard Freeman, Bob Hamman, Zia Mahmood, Jeff Meckstroth, Eric Rodwell	Roy Welland, Brian Glubok, Steve Garner, Howard Weinstein, Billy Cohen, Ron Smith
2009	Nick Nickell, Ralph Katz, Bob Hamman, Zia Mahmood, Jeff Meckstroth, Eric Rodwell	Rafal Jagniewski, Michał Kwiecień, Josef Piekarek, Alexander Smirnov
2010	Jimmy Cayne, Michael Seamon, Giorgio Duboin, Antonio Sementa, Lorenzo Lauria, Alfredo Versace	Steve Garner, Christal Henner-Welland, Josef Piekarek, Alexander Smirnov, Howard Weinstein, Roy Welland
2011	Jimmy Cayne, Michael Seamon, Giorgio Duboin, Antonio Sementa, Lorenzo Lauria, Alfredo Versace	Pierre Zimmermann, Franck Multon, Fulvio Fantoni, Claudio Nunes, Geir Helgemo, Tor Helness
2012	Pierre Zimmermann, Franck Multon, Fulvio Fantoni, Claudio Nunes, Geir Helgemo, Tor Helness	Sabine Auken, Roy Welland, Lew Stansby, Bart Bramley
2013	Pierre Zimmermann, Franck Multon, Fulvio Fantoni, Claudio Nunes, Geir Helgemo, Tor Helness	Andrey Gromov, Krzysztof Buras, Grzegorz Narkiewicz, Alexander Dubinin, Norberto Bocchi, Agustin Madala
2014	Richard Schwartz, Allan Graves, Boye Brogeland, Espen Lindqvist, Lotan Fisher, Ron Schwartz	Nick Nickell, Ralph Katz, Robert Levin, Steve Weinstein, Jeff Meckstroth, Eric Rodwell
2015	Vytautas V Vainikonis, Piotr Zatorski, Wojtek Olanski, Boguslaw Gierulski, Jerzy Skrzypczak, Ron Pachtmann	Mark Gordon, Pratap Rajadhyaksha, David Berkowitz, Jacek Pszczoła, Michael Rosenberg, Alan Sontag
2016	Mike Kamil, Waleed El Ahmady, Richard Coren, Tarek Sadek, Mike Becker, Aubrey Strul	John Diamond, Geoff Hampson, Eric Greco, Justin Lall, Kevin Bathurst, Brian Platnick
2017	Jianhua Miao (NPC), Yinghao Liu, Jack Zhao, Yuxiong Shen, Zijian Shao	George Mittelman, Ron Pachtmann, Piotr Pawel Zatorski, Ken Bercuson
2018	Josef Blass (NPC), Jacek Pszczola, Jacek Kalita, Michal Nowosadzki, Sjoert Brink, Bas Drijver	George Mittelman, Ron Pachtmann, Piotr Pawel Zatorski, Ken Bercuson
2019	Norberto Bocchi, Dennis Bilde, Antonio Sementa, Agustin Madala, Giorgio Duboin, Phillipe Cronier	Josef Blass (NPC), Jacek Pszczola, Jacek Kalita, Michal Nowosadzki, Sjoert Brink, Bas Drijver
2020	Cancelled due to the COVID-19 pandemic	
2021	Nick Nickell, Ralph Katz, Robert Levin, Steve Weinstein, Geoff Hampson, Eric Greco	Sylvia Moss, Lorenzo Lauria, Alfredo Versace, Jacek Kalita, Michal Nowosadzki
2022	Pierre Zimmermann, Michal Klukowski, Piotr Gawrys, Sjoert Brink, Sebastiaan Drijver, Fernando Piedra	Roger Lee, Simon Ekenberg, Kevin Rosenberg, Simon Cope
2023	Aldo Gerli, Leonardo Fruscoloni, Norberto Bocchi, Alessandro Gandoglia	Bobby Levin, Geoff Hampson, Eric Greco, Steve Weinstein, Ralph Katz, Nick Nickell
2024	Kevin Rosenberg, Jie Li, Brian Platnick, Yongge Zhang	Leslie Amoils, Nabil Edgtton, Michael Whibley, Andy Hung, Sartaj Hans
2025	Connie Goldberg, Hua Poon, Marion Michielsen, Per-Ola Cullin, Antonio Palma	Jodi Edmonds, Zachary Grossack, Geir Helgemo, Sjoert Brink, Bas Drijver

== See also ==
- Spingold Knockout Teams
- Vanderbilt Knockout Teams

== Sources ==
- List of previous winners, Pages 10–11. Daily Bulletin (PDF), vol. 81–8, November 28, 2008, archived from the original (PDF) on 2014-12-16
- 2008 winners, Page 1. Daily Bulletin (PDF), vol. 81–11, December 1, 2008
- "Search Results: Reisinger BAM Teams". ACBL. Visit "NABC Winners"; select a Fall NABC. Retrieved 2014-06-05.
