= Alfredo Versace =

Italian contract bridge player (born 1969)

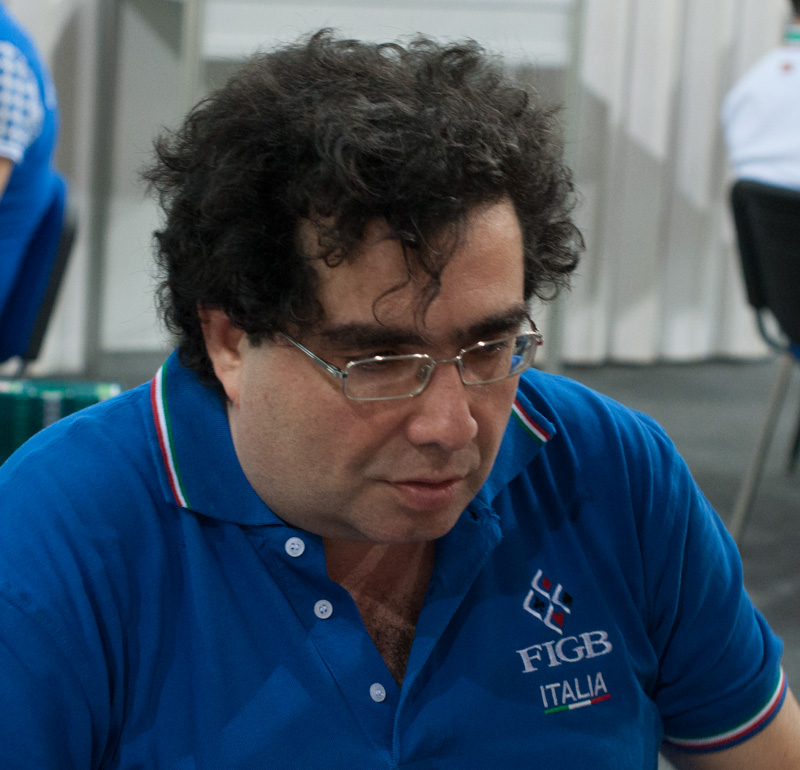
Alfredo Versace (2014)

Alfredo Versace (born 4 June 1969) is an Italian professional bridge player. He has been a stalwart on Italian teams for two decades and has won many European and world championships. As of July 2014 he ranks fourth among Open World Grand Masters and his regular partner Lorenzo Lauria ranks fifth.

Versace watched the game as a youngster at his grandfather's club. He played in his first tournament at the age of ten and at fifteen he joined Belladonna–Garozzo on Italy's Lavazza team in Turin.

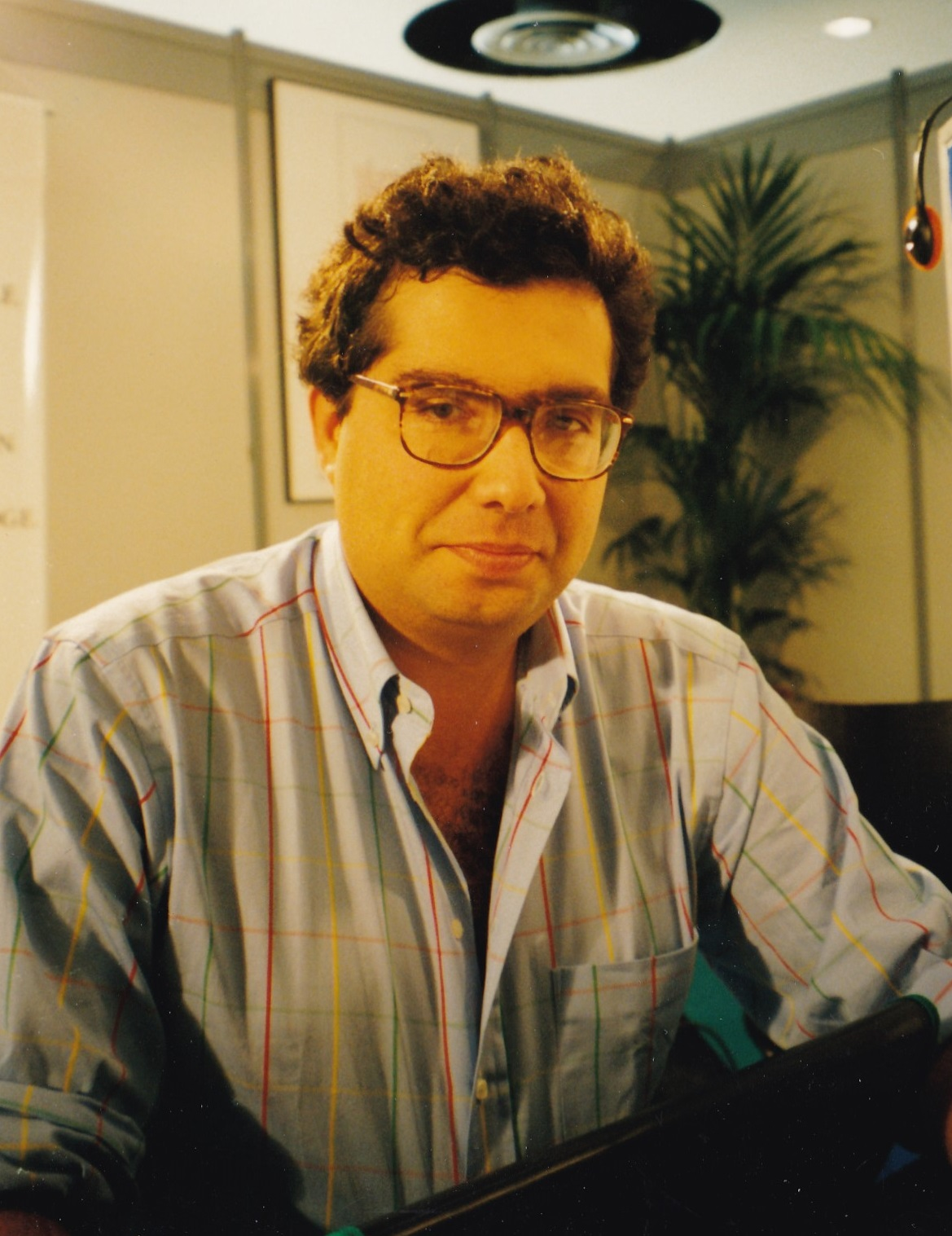
Alfredo Versace at the 10th World Championships in Lille, France, 1998.

== Major bridge tournament wins ==
- 1st World Mind Sports Games (Open Teams): 2008
- Bermuda Bowl 2005, 2013
- European Mixed Championships (Mixed Teams): 2002
- European Champions' Cup (Open Teams): 2002, 2003, 2004, 2005, 2007, 2008, 2009
- Mitchell Open BAM Teams: 2002, 2003
- Spingold Knockout Teams: 2001, 2002, 2015
- Jacoby Open Swiss: 2001
- World Team Olympiad : 2000, 2004
- Reisinger BAM: 2000, 2007, 2010
- IOC Grand Prix: 1999
- Vanderbilt Knockout Teams: 1999, 2004
- World Team Championships: 1998, 2002, 2005
- Cavendish Invitational Teams: 1996, 1997
- European Team Championships: 1995, 1997, 2001, 2002, 2004, 2006, 2010
- European Youth Team Championship: 1992
