= Mitchell Board-a-Match Teams =

National bridge championship

The Mitchell Board-a-Match Teams national bridge championship is held at the fall American Contract Bridge League (ACBL) North American Bridge Championship (NABC). It is an open four session board-a-match event with two qualifying sessions and two final sessions. The event typically starts on the first Sunday of the NABC.

More formally, according to the 2004 ACBL list of "Permanent Trophies" that recognize outstanding members, "The Victor Mitchell trophy is awarded to the winners of the Open Board-a-Match Teams held at the Fall NABC." Victor "Vic" Mitchell was a member of the winning team in 1962 and 1963.

== History ==
The event was introduced in 1946 as a men's event until 1990 when it became an open event.

An interesting situation occurred in 1977 when there were only three winners: Richard Doughty, Ron Smith and Lou Bluhm (plus these players eligible for session awards only: Bruce Ferguson, Sidney Lazard, Leslie West and Irv Kostal). Lazard was supposed to play with Doughty but after a good first set, Lazard became ill and Kostal took his place for the evening session. Lazard was better the next day and in his seat for the first final session. Suddenly he toppled over and was rushed to a hospital. Meanwhile, Doughty had to find another partner and Ferguson was pressed into service. Ferguson, whose team had not qualified the previous day, was technically ineligible but was allowed to play only in the afternoon. In the evening, Doughty recruited Leslie West—his fourth partner in four sessions—and the team went on to victory by a margin of two full boards.

== Winners ==
Winners of Men's Board-a-Match Teams (1946–1989)
Year	Winners	Runners-up
1946	Maynard Adams, Julius Bank, Arthur Glatt, William McGhee, Albert Weiss	A. Mitchell Barnes, John R. Crawford, Charles Goren, George Rapée, Sidney Silodor
1947	Jeff Glick, Arthur S. Goldsmith, Jack Kravatz, Alvin Landy, Sol Mogal	Joseph Cohan, Louis Mark, H. Russ Storr, George Unger
1948	Jack L. Ankus, Jeff Glick, Alvin Landy, John H. Law, Sol Mogal	John R. Crawford, Edward N. Marcus, George Rapée, Sam Stayman
1949	Muriel Levin, Sonny Moyse, Leo Roet, Howard Schenken	Joseph Cohan, Herbert J. Gerst, Jack L. Ankus, William Joseph, H. Russ Storr
1950	Edward Burns, John F. Carlin, David Carter, A. Richard Revell	Robert Appleyard, Ned Drucker, Fred Hirsch, Milton Moss, Milton Vernoff
1951	J. Van Brooks, Eugene Dautell, Jack Denny, Ace Gutowsky, Edwin J. Smith	Fred L. Bickel, Joseph J. Foreacre, Robert Lattomus, Ronald Rosenberg
1952	Charles Goren, Oswald Jacoby, Sidney Silodor, Charles J. Solomon, Sam Stayman	2/3. Samuel Katz, Charles Kuhn, William Seamon, Albert Weiss; 2/3. Harry Fishbein, Harold Harkavy, Alvin Roth, Tobias Stone, Waldemar von Zedtwitz
1953	Ben Fain, John Gerber, George Heath, Paul Hodge, Harold Rockaway	Clifford W. Bishop, Harry Fishbein, Arnold Kauder, John H. Moran, Douglas Steen
1954	Aaron J. Frank, Jeff Glick, Arthur S. Goldsmith, Alvin Landy, Sol Mogal	Henry Chanin, John W. Fisher, Jim Jacoby, Oswald Jacoby, Sidney Lazard
1955	Richard Freeman, Edgar Kaplan, Ralph Hirschberg, Norman Kay, Alvin Roth	Charles Goren, Peter Leventritt, Charles J. Solomon, Sam Stayman
1956	John R. Crawford, Ben Fain, Paul H. Hodge, Sidney Silodor	2/3. Paul Allinger, John W. Fisher, Emmanuel Hochfeld, Oswald Jacoby, Sidney Lazard; 2/3. Barry Crane, Harold Rockaway, Clarence A. Strouse, John H. Toledano
1957	Lew Mathe, Donald Oakie, Meyer Schleifer, Edward O. Taylor	Israel Cohen, Richard Freeman, John C. Kunkel, Alvin Roth, Ivar Stakgold
1958	Jeff Glick, Arthur S. Goldsmith, Alvin Landy, Elmer I. Schwartz, Vic D. Zeve	Richard Freeman, Edgar Kaplan, Norman Kay, Ralph Hirschberg
1959	Ollie Adams, Ivan Erdos, Oswald Jacoby, Robert G. Sharp	B. Jay Becker, John R. Crawford, Sidney Silodor, Tobias Stone
1960	Charles Denby, Burrell I. Humphreys, Alan W. Messer, Marty Scheinberg, Robert P. Wakeman	2/4. Harry Fishbein, John Gerber, Paul H. Hodge, Charles J. Solomon; 2/4 Wilfred Dumas, Donald McGee, John Siverts, Jerzy Zawisza; 2/4. James R. Hughes, Marvin Paulshock, Eli Reich, David Treadwell
1961	John R. Crawford, Norman Kay, Alvin Roth, Sidney Silodor, Tobias Stone	Edgar Kaplan, Mervin Key, Sidney Lazard, Bobby Nail
1962	1/2. Phil Feldesman, Richard Freeman, Victor Mitchell, Eric Murray, Sam Stayman; 1/2. Paul Allinger, Harold Guiver, Lew Mathe, Edward O. Taylor	
1963	Phil Feldesman, Victor Mitchell, Sam Stayman, Tobias Stone	B. Jay Becker, Norman Kay, Bill Root, Sol Rubinow, Sidney Silodor
1964	Ivan Erdos, Harold Guiver, Mike Lawrence, Alfred Sheinwold	Charles Coon, Bobby Nail, Robert Stucker, Frank T. Westcott
1965	Harry Fishbein, Jeff Rubens, Charles J. Solomon, Roger D. Stern	Phil Feldesman, Sidney Lazard, Victor Mitchell, Daniel Rotman, Sam Stayman
1966	Phil Feldesman, Richard Freeman, Edgar Kaplan, Norman Kay	Anthony Dionisi, Jeremy Flint, Harlow S. Lewis, Peter Pender
1967	Thomas E. Bussey, Jim R. Dunlap, Lawrence Jolma, Robert P. Patterson, Gary Stark	Edward J. Barlow, Phil Read, Robert Spotts, John Sutherlin
1968	Ira Corn, Billy Eisenberg, Bobby Goldman, Jim Jacoby, Mike Lawrence, Bobby Wolff	Mike Becker, Charles Coon, Joel H. Stuart, Peter Weichsel, Richard Zeckhauser
1969	Chuck Burger, Jimmy Cayne, Alvin Roth, Paul Trent	2/3. Billy Eisenberg, Bobby Goldman, Bob Hamman, Jim Jacoby, Mike Lawrence, Bobby Wolff; 2/3. Martin J. Cohn, Norman H. Fischer, Charles M. MacCracken, Bill Reister
1970	Bernie Bergovoy, Donald P. Krauss, Lew Mathe, Don Pearson, John Swanson, Richard Walsh	Eddie Kantar, Kyle Larsen, Paul Soloway, Ron Von der Porten
1971	Bernie Chazen, Alvin Roth, Alan Sontag, Paul Trent	Gerald Caravelli, Larry T. Cohen, Barry Crane, John Fisher
1972	Jack Blair, Jim Jacoby, John Simon, Paul Swanson, Bobby Wolff	Grant Baze, William Grieve, Donald P. Krauss, Lew Mathe, Peter Pender, George Rapée
1973	Garey Hayden, Jim Jacoby, Gaylor Kasle, John Simon, Bobby Wolff	2/3. Lou Bluhm, Steve Goldberg, Lawrence Gould, Steve Robinson; 2/3. John R. Crawford, Norm Kurlander, Alvin Roth, Clifford Russell, William Seamon
1974	Ron Andersen, Mark Feldman, Stephen Goldstein, Hugh MacLean, Merle Tom	2/3. Eric Kokish, Steve Robinson, Mike Shuman, Joey Silver; 2/3. Harold Guiver, Marty Shallon, William Sides, Mike Smolen
1975	Matt Granovetter, William Grieve, George Rapée, Ron Rubin	Roger Bates, Edgar Kaplan, Norman Kay, George Rosenkranz
1976	David Ashley, Paul Heitner, John Lowenthal, Mike Smolen	Bart Bramley, Marvin Herbert, Howard Piltch, Lou Reich, Ira Rubin
1977	Lou Bluhm, Richard Doughty, Ron L. Smith, (Bruce Ferguson, Irv Kostal, Sidney Lazard, Leslie West)*	Richard Freeman, Alvin Roth, Clifford Russell, Curtis Smith, Merle Tom, Art Waldmann
1978	Neil Chambers, Eric Kokish, Peter Nagy, Steve Robinson, John Schermer, Kit Woolsey	Steve Garner, Dave Lehman, Dick Melson, Larry Oakey
1979	Allan Cokin, Steve Sion, Alan Sontag, Jim Sternberg, Peter Weichsel	Mike Cappelletti, Ron Feldman, Gary Hann, David Hoffner, Zeke Jabbour, David Sacks
1980	Bart Bramley, Ross Grabel, William Rosen, Milton Rosenberg, Sam Stayman, George Tornay	Ira Corn, Fred Hamilton, Bob Hamman, Ira Rubin, Bobby Wolff
1981	Marty Bergen, Neil Chambers, Joey Silver, Allan Stauber	Michael Aliotta, Marc Culbertson, Jim Gardner, Bert Newman
1982	Dave Berkowitz, Matt Granovetter, Harold Lilie, Al Rand	Bob Blanchard, Drew Casen, Chuck Lamprey, Thomas M. Smith
1983	Tommy Sanders, Harold Guiver, Grant Baze, John Sutherlin	Cliff Russell, Bobby Levin, Richard Freeman, Lou Bluhm, John Solodar, Ron Gerard
1984	George Rosenkranz, Eddie Wold, Jeff Meckstroth, Eric Rodwell, Marty Bergen, Larry N. Cohen	Malcolm Brachman, Bobby Wolff, Bob Hamman, Paul Soloway, Ron Andersen, Bobby Goldman
1985	Hal Mouser, Josh Parker, Ron Gerard, Dan Rotman	Roger Bates, John Mohan, Alan Sontag, John Devine
1986	Gene Freed, Mike Passell, Ed Manfield, Kit Woolsey, Mark Lair	Don Caton, Robert Kehoe, Gene Simpson, Robert Teel
1987	George Rosenkranz, Eddie Wold, Ira Chorush, Peter Weichsel, Bobby Levin	Bart Bramley, Steve Garner, Howard Weinstein, Lou Bluhm
1988	James Cayne, Bob Hamman, Bobby Wolff, Mike Passell, Chuck Burger, Mark Lair	Victor Mitchell, Albert Rahmey, Michael Moss, Drew Casen, Howard Hertzberg
1989	Peter Boyd, Steve Robinson, Ed Manfield, Kit Woolsey	Jimmy Cayne, Chuck Burger, Bob Hamman, Bobby Wolff, Lew Stansby, Dave Berkowitz

Winners of Open Board-a-Match Teams (1990–)
Year	Winners	Runners-up
1990	Mark Moss, Robert Thompson, Daniel Molochko, Jack Wholly	George Rosenkranz, Eddie Wold, Peter Weichsel, Bobby Levin, Marty Bergen, Larry N. Cohen
1991	Zia Mahmood, Michael Rosenberg, Jeffrey Wolfson, David Berkowitz, Larry N. Cohen	Jim Hall, Tom Fox, Dick Melson, David Lehman
1992	Richard Katz, Garey Hayden, Wafik Abdou, Ira Cohen; Mike Whitman (npc)	Drew Cannell, Jeffrey Hand, Claudio Caponi, Steve Hamaoui
1993	Paul Soloway, Bobby Goldman, Mark Lair, Mike Passell; Jimmy Cayne (npc)	Jim Hall, Tom Fox, Dave Lehman, Dick Melson
1994	Andy Goodman, Peter Boyd, Ed Manfield, John Mohan, Steve Robinson, Kit Woolsey	Brian Glubok, Steve Zolotow, Chris Compton, Lew Stansby, Ron Smith
1995	Chip Martel, Lew Stansby, Steve Weinstein, Fred Stewart	James Cayne, Chuck Burger, Paul Soloway, Mike Passell, Mark Lair, Bobby Goldman
1996	Robert Baldwin, Bobby Levin, Peter Weichsel, Zia Mahmood, Michael Rosenberg	David Mossop, Paul Hackett, Justin Hackett, Jason Hackett
1997	Bob Blanchard, Jim Krekorian, Doug Doub, John Rengstorff	Allen Hawkins, Russ Ekeblad, Jim Foster, John Sutherlin, Ron L. Smith
1998	Grant Baze, Fred Gitelman, George Mittelman, Brad Moss, Michael Whitman	Nick Nickell, Richard Freeman, Bob Hamman, Paul Soloway, Jeff Meckstroth, Eric Rodwell
1999	Rita Shugart, Geir Helgemo, Tony Forrester, Andrew Robson	Nick Nickell, Richard Freeman, Bob Hamman, Paul Soloway, Jeff Meckstroth, Eric Rodwell
2000	Andrey Gromov, Alexander Petrunin, Cezary Balicki, Adam Żmudziński	Eddie Wold, George Rosenkranz, Sam Lev, John Mohan, Piotr Gawryś, Jacek Pszczoła
2001	Rose Meltzer, Kyle Larsen, Peter Weichsel, Alan Sontag, Chip Martel, Lew Stansby	George Jacobs, Ralph Katz, Norberto Bocchi, Giorgio Duboin, Lorenzo Lauria, Alfredo Versace
2002	George Jacobs, Ralph Katz, Norberto Bocchi, Giorgio Duboin, Lorenzo Lauria, Alfredo Versace	Roy Welland, Björn Fallenius, Steve Garner, Howard Weinstein, Fred Gitelman
2003	George Jacobs, Ralph Katz, Norberto Bocchi, Giorgio Duboin, Lorenzo Lauria, Alfredo Versace	Sam Lev, Brian Glubok, Michał Kwiecień, Jacek Pszczoła, Reese Milner
2004	Christal Henner-Welland, Mike Kamil, Fulvio Fantoni, Claudio Nunes, Peter Bertheau, Fredrik Nystrom	Roy Welland, Björn Fallenius, Michael Rosenberg, Zia Mahmood, Cezary Balicki, Adam Żmudziński
2005	Roy Welland, Björn Fallenius, Chip Martel, Lew Stansby, Cezary Balicki, Adam Żmudziński	Michael Whitman, Grant Baze, Steve Beatty, Sam Lev, Jacek Pszczoła
2006	George Jacobs, Ralph Katz, Zia Mahmood, Michael Rosenberg, Steve Weinstein, Bobby Levin	John Onstott, Steve Beatty, Drew Casen, Jim Krekorian, Jørgen Molberg, Terje Aa
2007	Aubrey Strul, Mike Becker, David Berkowitz, Larry N. Cohen, Lew Stansby, Chip Martel	Aleksander Dubinin, Andrew Gromov, Cezary Balicki, Adam Żmudziński
2008	Bob Hamman, Zia Mahmood, Jeff Meckstroth, Eric Rodwell	Aubrey Strul, Mike Becker, David Berkowitz, Larry N. Cohen, Chip Martel, Lew Stansby
2009	Josef Blass, Aleksander Dubinin, Andrew Gromov, Jerzy Zaremba, Cezary Balicki, Adam Żmudziński	Doug Doub, Craig Gower, Jacob Morgan, Michael Polowan, Adam Wildavsky
2010	Josef Blass, Aleksander Dubinin, Andrew Gromov, Marcin Leśniewski, Cezary Balicki, Adam Żmudziński	Rob Brady, Alan Kleist, Howard Liu, Danning Dong
2011	Michael Seamon, Jimmy Cayne, Antonio Sementa, Giorgio Duboin, Alfredo Versace, Lorenzo Lauria	Jared Lilienstein, Michael Polowan, Jan Jansma, Adam Wildavsky
2012	Mike Becker, Aubrey Strul, Howard Weinstein, Steve Garner, Tarek Sadek, Waleed El Ahmady	Ralph Katz, Bobby Levin, Steve Weinstein, Eric Rodwell, Nick Nickell
2013	Jim Mahaffey, Tony Forrester, Jean Quantin, Marc Bompis, Alexander Smirnov, Josef Piekarek	Jill Levin, Bobby Levin, Steve Weinstein, Jenny Wolpert
2014	Andrew Gromov, Aleksander Dubinin, Krzysztof Buras, Grzegorz Narkiewicz, Jacek Jerzy Kalita, Michal Nowosadzki	Michael Kamil, Stan Tulin, Gary Cohler, Billy Cohen, Dror Padon, Alon Birman
2015	Richard Schwartz, Allan Graves, Boye Brogeland, Espen Lindqvist, Huub Bertens, Daniel Korbel	Vytautas V Vainikonis, Wojtek Olanski, Boguslaw Gierulski, Jerzy Skrzypczak, Ron Pachtmann, Piotr Pawel Zatorski
2016	Stan Tulin, Kevin Dwyer, Alon Birman, Dror Padon, Michal Nowosadzki, Jacek Kalita	Daniel Korbel, David Bakhshi, Richard Schwartz, Boye Brogeland, Espen Lindqvist, David Gold
2017	Richard Schwartz, David Gold, Jerry Stamatov, Diyan Danailov. Michael Bell	James Cayne, Alan Sontag, Giovanni Donati, Alfredo Versace, Lorenzo Lauria, Mustafa Cem Tokay
2018	Marty Fleisher, Chip Martel, Geoff Hampson, Eric Greco, Joe Grue, Brad Moss	Mikael Rimstedt, Ola Rimstedt, Marion Michielson, Per-Ola Cullin, Peter Bertheau, Daniel Zagorin
2019	Howard Weinstein, Michael Becker, Bob Hamman, Peter Weichsel, Liam Milne, Andy Hung	Margie Cole, Alejandro Biachedi, Giorgia Botta, Cenk Tuncok
2020	Not held (COVID-19)	Not held (COVID-19)
2021	Mitch Dunitz, Mark Itabashi, Iftikhar Baqai, Ross Grabel	Tim Verbeek, Patricia Cayne, Dano De Falco, Danny Molenaar, Bart Nab, Bob Drijver
2022	John McAllister, Alexander Wernle, Jovanka Smederevac, Sveinn Eiriksson	Corey Krantz, Bruce Lang, Jerry Stamatov, Ivan Nanev Ivanov
2023	Shan Huang, Kevin Dwyer-Rimstedt, Cecilia Dwyer-Rimstedt, Mikael Rimstedt, Ola Rimstedt	Louk Verhees Jr, Stan Tulin, Billy Cohen, Gary Cohler, Thibo Sprinkhuizen, Guy Mendes de Leon
2024	Robb Gordon, Richard Oshlag, Ron Gerard, Mark Lair	Alex Perlin, David Yang, Difan Wang, Xiaojing Deng
2025	Sebastiaan Drijver, Michal Klukowski, Jacek Kalita, Sjoert Brink, Pierre Zimmermann, Franck Multon	Bart Bramley, Kit Woolsey, Peter Weichsel, James Krekorian

* Session awards only

== See also ==
- Reisinger
- Sternberg Women's Board-a-Match Teams

== Sources ==
- Pre-2010 winners:Daily Bulletin, vol. 83–3, November 28, 2010, p. 6, archived from the original on July 13, 2012
- 2010 winners:Daily Bulletin, vol. 83–5, November 30, 2010, p. 1, archived from the original on July 13, 2012
