= Alfred Sheinwold =

American bridge expert

Alfred (Freddy) Sheinwold (January 26, 1912 – March 8, 1997) was an American bridge player, administrator, international team captain, and prolific writer. He and Edgar Kaplan developed the Kaplan–Sheinwold bidding system. Among other administrative assignments that he accepted, Sheinwold chaired the American Contract Bridge League (ACBL) National Laws Commission from 1964 to 1975, and the ACBL Appeals Committee from 1966 to 1970. He was an editor of The Bridge World monthly magazine from 1934 to 1963 and was the editor of the monthly ACBL members' Bridge Bulletin from 1952 to 1958.

Upon his death early in 1997, the New York Times bridge columnist Alan Truscott called Sheinwold "the Grand Old Man of Bridge" (Note: Truscott had identified Sheinwold as currently "The Grand Old Man of Bridge" or the "G.O.M." in January 1993, seventh in a sometimes-broken line from R.F. Foster in the 1930s. The qualifications: "He must be an active octogenarian, spreading knowledge of the game by writing, and must have at least one other credential, as player, theorist, teacher, lawmaker or administrator." (Milton Work may have been the first Grand Old Man of Bridge around 1930, but he died at age 70.)) and observed that he was the last of "the founders of contract bridge".

== Early years ==
Sheinwold was born in London, England, and emigrated to the United States as age 9. He was a bridge expert when he graduated from City College of New York in 1933, and was then "immediately hired by Ely Culbertson". He soon became well known as a bridge writer and editor. He started work as an editor for Culbertson's monthly magazine The Bridge World from 1934 to 1963 as technical editor, then managing editor, and then senior editor. After Edgar Kaplan purchased The Bridge World, Sheinwold became one of four expert members on the rotating directorship of the Master Solvers Club, from 1967 to 1980. He occasionally wrote Bridge World articles under the pseudonym Saxon Fairwood (Saxon for the Anglo-Saxon King Alfred; Fairwood as a pseudo-translation of "Schein Wald"—sunny (or fair) for Schein, wood for Wald).

During World War II, Sheinwold interrupted his bridge career to serve as chief code and cipher expert in the U.S. Office of Strategic Services.

== National tournaments ==
During the time when he and Edgar Kaplan developed the K–S bidding system, Sheinwold was successful in national-level ACBL tournaments (North America). He won the Chicago Board-a-Match Teams (now known as the Reisinger) in 1958 and played on the runner-up teams in both the 1958 Vanderbilt and 1959 Master Mixed Teams. (Kaplan was also a member of all three teams.) (Note: Upon Kaplan's death later that year, Truscott observed that Kaplan, not Sheinwold, was "a player of the highest class". He called inverted minor raises the greatest contribution of the K–S system to modern tournament play.) He won the Spring National Men's Teams in 1964 and had many regional-level wins.

== Card play ==
Sheinwold is credited with the following at-the-table play in a 6♥ slam contract, reprinted by José Le Dentu:

Contract: 6♥		♠♤	K J 5		
Contract: 6♥		♥	Q J		
Contract: 6♥		♦	A K 6 5 3 2		
Contract: 6♥		♣♧	9 4		
♠♤	9 8 4 2	N W E S		♠♤	Q 10 3
♥	8 5	N W E S		♥	10 9 4 2
♦	J 8	N W E S		♦	Q 10 9 7
♣♧	Q 10 8 6 2	N W E S		♣♧	J 7
Lead: ♥5		♠♤	A 7 6		
Lead: ♥5		♥	A K 7 6 3		
Lead: ♥5		♦	4		
Lead: ♥5		♣♧	A K 5 3		

On the opening ♥5 lead, Sheinwold played the ♥J and East followed with the ♥2. To cater for a 4-2 break in both red suits, Sheinwold initiated a ducking play at the second trick and led dummy's ♦2 to be won by East with the ♦Q. East returned the ♣J, won by Sheinwold's ace.

Now, Sheinwold could subsequently lead to dummy's ♥Q, ruff a low diamond, pull trumps and get to dummy with the ♠K to run the diamonds. The likely 4-2 diamond split means that playing even one top diamond before ruffing a low one upsets the communication between the two hands: this forces declarer to rely on a spade finesse or a low-percentage throw-in.

== Non-playing captain ==
Sheinwold was often sought as captain by US teams that were pursuing national and international championships. He captained the 1985 US team that won the Bermuda Bowl, and also the 1975 North America team that placed second in the same event, one that was marred by scandal.

Prior to the 1975 Bermuda Bowl, when bidding screens were first used in that world championship tournament, Sheinwold had written an article, published by Popular Bridge, that predicted Italy (still fielding two of the legendary Blue Team) would not play so effectively now that screens would be in place. However, in a different article, he also stated that he did not question the honesty of Italian bridge experts. The Italians were of course upset by the former, notwithstanding the apparently contradictory latter.

It was particularly unfortunate, then, that an American newspaper reporter saw one member of an Italian pair, Facchini and Zucchelli, tapping his partner's feet with his own in a suspicious manner. Impartial observers from the World Bridge Federation (WBF) were brought in and confirmed the behavior. After deliberation by the tournament officials, the players in question were severely reprimanded but allowed to continue in the tournament.

In protest, the American team threatened to withdraw from the tournament – the final – if forced to play against the Italian pair, unless ordered to do so by the ACBL. They were ordered to play, as most, including themselves, anticipated they would be. The Italians prevailed over the Americans in the finals.

When Sheinwold first heard allegations against Facchini–Zucchelli, he had to make a difficult decision whether to inform Lew Mathe, then President of the Board of Directors of the ACBL. He decided to defer informing Mathe, so as not to compromise the investigation. When the ACBL Board learned of that decision, it removed Sheinwold from a panel of future captains and publicized its action in a fashion that many at the time found petty. Sheinwold then resigned as Chairman of the ACBL's Laws Commission.

Sheinwold was vindicated in 1977 when, during an affair involving cheating allegations against an American pair, Richard H. Katz and Larry T. Cohen, Mathe spoke in public regarding supposedly secret negotiations. The Bridge World wrote at the time:

"A member of the ACBL Board apologized to Freddy Sheinwold for having criticized team-captain Sheinwold's failure, in the Bermuda scandal of '75, to notify Mathe, then League President, immediately after hearing about the Italian pair. 'You were 100% right not to tell him', the Board member said ruefully."

== Bridge writer ==
Sheinwold may be known best for his syndicated newspaper column, which ran for more than 30 years. (Frank Stewart, Sheinwold's collaborator for several years, took over the column following Sheinwold's death.) But he also prepared the AutoBridge hands and discussions, and wrote Five Weeks to Winning Bridge, which sold more than a million copies – phenomenal sales for a book on a card game. He was principal author of The Kaplan–Sheinwold System of Winning Bridge, the first extended description of K–S. Sheinwold's smooth, encouraging writing style made him the most popular bridge writer of his time.

One celebrity who learned much from Sheinwold's column was his fellow San Fernando Valley resident Buster Keaton. After playing at the actor's home in 1965, he conceded, "It's disconcerting to play against a man who fires the perfect card back at you without stopping for breath or moving a muscle of his face."

== Death ==
Sheinwold died in Sherman Oaks, Los Angeles, at the age of 85, following a series of strokes. He was survived by his wife Paula, a brother, and two sisters.

== Selected works ==
- First Book of Bridge (Barnes & Noble, 1952), Everyday handbook no. 242, OCLC 1153570
- 101 Best Card Games for Children, illustrated by Doug Anderson (New York: Sterling Books, 1956), 128 pp., OCLC 1474954
- 5 Weeks to Winning Bridge (New York: Permabooks, 1959) – subsequently revised and enlarged
- How to Play Winning Bridge, Edgar Kaplan and Sheinwold (New York: Fleet Pub. Corp., 1963), 256 pp., OCLC 1523569
- The Kaplan–Sheinwold System of Winning Bridge, Kaplan and Sheinwold (Fleet, 1963), 283 pp. – second, revised edition of How to Play Winning Bridge, OCLC 1139473
- 101 Best Family Card Games, illus. Myron Miller (Sterling, 1992), 128 pp. – "Based on: 101 best card games for the family", OCLC 26767785

Continued by Sterling under Sheila Anne Barry and others, 1998 OCLC 42079339 and 2003 OCLC 165088002.

- Bridge with Algy (The Bridge World) – collection of Sheinwold's TBW featuring "a fictional Englishman who was often a victim of the fates"

== Bridge accomplishments ==
=== Honors ===
- ACBL Hall of Fame, 1996
- ACBL Honorary Member of the Year, 1983

=== Awards ===
- Romex Award (Best Bid Hand of the Year) 1995 (Winning Journalist)

=== Wins ===
- North American Bridge Championships (2)
  - Chicago (now Reisinger) (1) 1958
  - Men's Board-a-Match Teams (1) 1964
- Other notable wins:
  - Goldman Pairs (1) 1955

=== Runners-up ===
- North American Bridge Championships (2)
  - Vanderbilt (1) 1958
  - Master Mixed Teams (1) 1959
