= George Rapée =

American bridge player

George Nicholas Rapée (May 22, 1915 – April 1, 1999) was an American bridge player. From 1942 to 1980 he was the most successful player in the American Contract Bridge League (ACBL) in its three most important teams-of-four tournaments, the Vanderbilt, Spingold, and Reisinger. He played on the American teams that won the first three Bermuda Bowls, 1950 to 1953.

== Life ==
Rapée was born and raised in New York City. His parents were from Hungary; his father Erno Rapée was a concert pianist and orchestra conductor. He earned bachelor's and law degrees at New York University and served in the US Army for three years during World War II. He was an attorney and real estate investor or, in the words of his obituary by Alan Truscott, "a real estate lawyer ... assembling properties for development".

He died at his home in Floral City, Florida, age 83, survived by his wife Joellen Hall Rapée, a daughter, and two grandsons.

== Bridge career ==
Rapée is known as the man who invented the Stayman convention that is named for Sam Stayman. (It was first published in 1945 under Stayman's name. One of the world's most popular bridge bidding conventions, generally as "Stayman", it was invented also and perhaps earlier by Jack Marx, for whom it is named in the U.K.) According to Truscott, Rapée had the idea c. 1940 that a two clubs response to one notrump asks for a major suit; his long-time partner Stayman "enlarged and publicized the idea".

Rapée was 21 years old when he first won a national title in 1936 (predating the ACBL, est. 1937, and not listed below). Sixty years later he "currently" entered all major American tournaments for open teams and he had been the oldest player to achieve several marks including a bronze medal as team captain and player in the 1990 Rosenblum Cup (off-year world championship).

Rapée and Stayman, as well as Johnny Crawford and Howard Schenken, played on the teams that won the first three Bermuda Bowls, representing America against Europe. (The inaugural event, played 1950 in Bermuda, was a 3-way tournament with Great Britain and "Europe", followed for several years by long head-to-head matches with a European champion that might be Great Britain.) One or two others played on each team. Rapée represented ACBL again in 1958 and 1969, on teams that placed second and third in the expanding tournament. He was on the third-place USA team in the inaugural, 1960 World Team Olympiad.

Rapée was Inducted into the ACBL Hall of Fame in 1997. He was the only survivor from the American teams in the first three Bermuda Bowls and, during the preceding year, the ACBL had ranked him number five among American players all-time according to a rating of first and second-place finishes in major North American and world tournaments.

According to his ACBL citation, critical coverage of the 1958 Bermuda Bowl, by Edgar Kaplan in The Bridge World, identified Rapée as the outstanding American player in defeat by Italy. Quoting Kaplan, "Rapée's performance was most impressive. He was the only American to play up to his potential, and his potential is considerable." Also quoted in the Hall of Fame citation, Bobby Wolff and Sidney Lazard suggested that Rapée may have been the best American player mid-century. Wolff called him "by far the most consistent" and Lazard "the best of the bunch, including John Crawford and Howard Schenken".

== Bridge accomplishments ==
=== Awards and honors ===
- ACBL Hall of Fame, 1997

=== World championships ===
- Wins (3)
  - Bermuda Bowl, 1950, 1951, 1953
- Other medals
  - Bermuda Bowl, second 1958, third 1969
  - World Team Olympiad, third 1960
  - Rosenblum Cup, third 1990

=== North America ===
North American Bridge Championships national-rated wins (24) and runners-up

- Wins
  - Master Individual (2) 1944, 1949
  - Vanderbilt (8) 1946, 1950, 1951, 1955, 1956, 1957, 1959, 1970
  - Mitchell Board-a-Match Teams (1) 1975
  - Chicago Mixed Board-a-Match (1) 1960
  - Reisinger (6) 1945, 1953, 1954, 1956, 1970, 1971
  - Spingold (6) 1944, 1948, 1950, 1952, 1957, 1968
- Runners-up
  - Rockwell Mixed Pairs (1) 1955
  - Wernher Open Pairs (2) 1945, 1950
  - Vanderbilt (5) 1942, 1944, 1952, 1965, 1967
  - Mitchell Board-a-Match Teams (3) 1946, 1948, 1972
  - Chicago Mixed Board-a-Match (2) 1952, 1968
  - Reisinger (6) 1947, 1948, 1950, 1968, 1969, 1972
  - Spingold (8) 1943, 1947, 1955, 1960, 1961, 1966, 1976, 1980
