= Ron Rubin =

Ron Rubin is the name of:

- Ron Rubin (voice actor) (born 1959), Canadian voice actor
- Ron Rubin (bridge) (born 1948), American bridge player
