= Richard Kahn =

Richard Kahn may refer to:

- Richard Kahn, Baron Kahn (1905–1989), British economist
- Richard C. Kahn (1897–1960), American film director
- Richard Kahn (bridge) (1912–1987), American bridge player
- Richard Kahn (marketing executive), American marketing executive
- Richard Kahn (accountant), American accountant
