= Master Individual =

National bridge championship

The Master Individual national bridge championship was held at the fall American Contract Bridge League (ACBL) North American Bridge Championship (NABC); it was held from 1931 until 1960 after which it was discontinued.

== Trophy ==
The event was contested for the Karn Trophy from 1931 to 1933 and the Steiner Trophy from 1934 to 1960.

Described as “a magnificent gold cup” by The Bridge World, the Karn trophy was donated by Willard S. Karn in 1931 for the National Individual Masters Championship. While refuting allegations of impropriety in 1933, Karn withdrew his trophy. It was replaced in 1934 by the Steiner Trophy donated by Albert Steiner and Philip Steiner of Cincinnati, Ohio.

== Winners ==
The Master Individual was contested thirty times with a single winner on every occasion. The inaugural event was played at the home of P. Hal Sims in Deal, New Jersey, 5–7 September 1931 and won by Karn himself. Howard Schenken won in 1932 and David Bruce was the final winner in 1933.

Four people won The Master Individual twice: B. Jay Becker, George Rapée, Harry Fishbein, and Morrie Elis. Becker was the sole runner-up three times and tied once; Fishbein and Elis were runners-up once each. Elinor Murdoch was second in 1933 and first in 1934. Sylvia Klein in 1958 was the only other woman champion.

Masters Individual, 1931 to 1960
Year	Winner	Runner-up
1931	Willard Karn	Richard L. Frey
1932	Howard Schenken	David Burnstine
1933	David Burnstine	Elinor Murdoch
1934	Elinor Murdoch	B. Jay Becker
1935	Oswald Jacoby	David Burnstine
1936	Waldemar von Zedtwitz	Merwyn Maier
1937	B. Jay Becker	George Unger
1938	Richard Ecker Jr.	Harry Fishbein
1939	Merwyn Maier	Alvin Landy
1940	Morrie Elis	Lee Hazen
1941	Lee Hazen	B. Jay Becker
1942	Harry Fishbein	Olive Peterson
1943	Alvin Roth	Charles Solomon
1944	George Rapée	Robert D. Chatkin
1945	Charles Goren	Albert Weiss
1946	Robert A. McPherran	Morrie Elis
1947	Charles J. Solomon	Jack Cushing
1948	B. Jay Becker	Myron Field
1949	George Rapée	B. Jay Becker
1950	Morrie Elis	Robert Appleyard
1951	Sidney Silodor	John R. Crawford
1952	Harry Fishbein	Peter Leventritt
1953	Tobias Stone	Larry Hirsch
1954	Edward Burns	F. Ayres Bombeck
1955	Norman Kay	2/3. B. Jay Becker; 2/3. Alvin Roth
1956	John R. Crawford	Robert Appleyard
1957	Edgar Kaplan	Ernest E. Karshmer
1958	Sylvia Stein	John R. Crawford
1959	Leo Pressburg	Frank L. Jackson
1960	Robert Reynolds	Arthur Robinson

== Sources ==
- Francis, Henry G.; Truscott, Alan F.; Francis, Dorthy A., eds. (2001). The Official Encyclopedia of Bridge (6th ed.). Memphis, TN: American Contract Bridge League. ISBN 0-943855-44-6. OCLC 49606900.
- "Search Results: Masters Individual". ACBL. Visit "NABC Winners"; select a Discontinued NABC. Retrieved 2014-06-04.
