= Silodor =

Silodor may refer to:

- Sidney Silodor, American bridge player
- Silodor Open Pairs, bridge competition named in his honor
