= Norman Kay (bridge) =

American bridge player

Norman Kay (August 11, 1927 – January 17, 2002) was an American bridge player. He partnered Sidney Silodor until Silodor's death in 1963. With Edgar Kaplan, Kay formed one of the most successful and longest-lasting partnerships in organized bridge. It spanned more than 40 years, and ended with Kaplan's death in 1997. He was from Narberth, Pennsylvania.

In 1955, Kay won the McKenney Trophy (now the Barry Crane Top 500) for earning the greatest number of masterpoints in American Contract Bridge League-sanctioned play during the year. Kay won 13 major North American Bridge Championships (NABC) in the period of 1957–1977, when he was named ACBL's top performance player. He was runner-up in the Bermuda Bowl twice (1961 and 1967), and was second (1968) and third (1960) in the World Team Olympiad. He was a World Bridge Federation World Life Master and an ACBL Grand Life Master. Kay was arguably the greatest bridge player who never became a world champion. He was known for both the remarkable accuracy of his card play and for his even temperament at the table. Away from the table, he was widely respected as an exceptionally kind and humble gentleman. According to Alan Truscott, Kay "bent over backward to avoid criticizing his partner, or his opponents, blaming himself for any misfortune if he possibly could." He also played slowly: "Kay believed in a thorough analysis at the table, and never played a card until he had examined every angle. This leisurely approach occasionally caused problems."

Kay was an account executive for Merrill Lynch for 38 years, retiring as a vice president in 1987. He helped his wife who operated a sports memorabilia business from 1980 to 1997. He and his wife, Judy, also owned a stable of standardbreds (trotters and pacers) from 1970 or 1980 to 1986 or 1987. Kay died from a pulmonary embolism on January 17, 2002. Judy Kay subsequently married Bobby Wolff in late 2003.

Kay was Inducted into the ACBL Hall of Fame in 1996.

== Bridge accomplishments ==
=== Honors ===
- ACBL Hall of Fame, 1996
- ACBL Honorary Member of the Year 2001

=== Awards ===
- McKenney Trophy 1955
- Mott-Smith Trophy 1960, 1963, 1968

=== Wins ===
- North American Bridge Championships (27)
  - Vanderbilt (7) 1959, 1960, 1968, 1970, 1981, 1983, 1986
  - Spingold (2) 1967, 1968
  - Chicago (now Reisinger) (1) 1961
  - Reisinger (7) 1966, 1967, 1971, 1982, 1983, 1984, 1990
  - Men's Board-a-Match Teams (3) 1955, 1961, 1966
  - Jacoby Open Swiss Teams (1) 1997
  - Blue Ribbon Pairs (1) 1974
  - Life Master Men's Pairs (1) 1973
  - Open Pairs (2) 1963, 1966
  - Men's Pairs, Spring NABC (1) 1958
  - Master Individual (1) 1955

=== Runners-up ===
- Bermuda Bowl (2) 1961, 1967
- World Open Team Olympiad (1) 1968
- North American Bridge Championships (21)
  - Vanderbilt (3) 1958, 1965, 1994
  - Spingold (5) 1960, 1961, 1965, 1971, 1978
  - Reisinger (1) 1969
  - Men's Board-a-Match Teams (3) 1958, 1963, 1975
  - Jacoby Open Swiss Teams (1) 1991
  - Master Mixed Teams (3) 1960, 1962, 1967
  - Fall National Open Pairs (1) 1956
  - Men's Pairs (3) 1958, 1965, 1970
  - Men's Pairs, Spring NABC (1) 1962
- United States Bridge Championships (5)
  - Open Team Trials (4) 1971, 1984, 1986, 1992
  - Open Pair Trials (1) 1966
