= Von Zedtwitz =

Von Zedtwitz is a surname. A family and notable people with the surname include:

- House of Zedtwitz, old family of the nobility of Saxony
- Waldemar von Zedtwitz (1896–1984), German-born American bridge player and administrator
  - Von Zedtwitz Life Master Pairs, bridge competition named for Waldemar
