= Michael T. Gottlieb =

American bridge player

Michael Theodore Gottlieb
- Born: November 28, 1900; Manhattan, New York City
- Died: April 8, 1980 (aged 79); Burlingame, California
- Known for: American bridge player
- Spouse: Grayce McMahon
- Parent(s): Herman Gottlieb; Jennie Berger

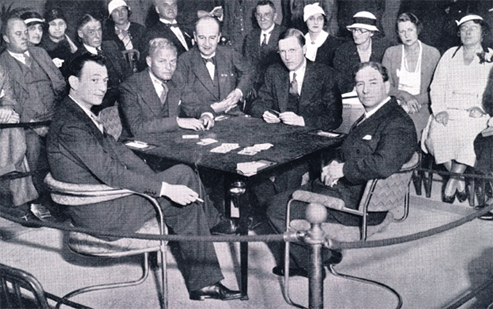
Culbertson–Beasley match for the Schwab Cup, 1933 in London. At table from left: Gottlieb, George Morris, referee Mr. Mundy, Theodore Lightner, Percy Tabbush. Behind far left, journalist Hubert Phillips; second right, Beasley's regular partner Lady Doris Rhodes.

Michael Theodore Gottlieb (November 28, 1900 – April 8, 1980) was an American bridge player, an original member of the Four Aces team established by David Burnstine in 1935.

Gottlieb is recognized by the American Contract Bridge League (ACBL) as Life Master #9, one of ten named in 1936. (Note: Gottlieb and nine others were named Life Masters by the American Bridge League in 1936. The ACBL was established by mergers of competing organizations, completed late in 1937, and it continued the ABL Life Master title and master points program.) He retired from tournament bridge that year.

== Biography ==
He was born on November 28, 1900, in Manhattan, New York City, to Herman Gottlieb and Jennie Berger.

Gottlieb won 13 United States Bridge Association championship tournaments from 1929 to 1935. He also played for the Culbertson team, as one partner of Ely Culbertson, during the 1931–32 Culbertson–Lenz match. He and Theodore Lightner were partners in the Culbertson–Beasley match for the Schwab Cup, 1933 in London (see photo).

Gottlieb and Schenken toured Europe in 1935 as a pair playing bridge for money.

Some, including ACBL, call the Four Aces the "first official world champions" based on their 1935 victory, back at home, "against a French foursome representing themselves as the European champion team".

Note. The European Bridge League, established in 1947, recognizes the International Bridge League championships contested in Europe from 1932 to 1939, of which six Frenchmen including Pierre Albarran won the 1935 rendition. Exceptionally, Americans were invited to participate in 1937, two teams from the US did so. The dual tournaments for open and women teams, contested in Budapest and both won by Austria (both as defending champions), are usually called the first world championships.

One 1935 press photograph, as presented by the seller of a print at eBay, calls Gottlieb "captain of the US Bridge team".

"At the end of 1936, he retired from competition to devote his time to business interests in California and Arizona."

In a humorous March 1937 magazine article, "Should We Abolish Bridge? Yessir!", Silas Bent portrayed Gottlieb as ousted by the Aces from a position of general leadership.

These four had been as inseparable as the Musketeers in Dumas' immortal story [The Three Musketeers]. They had developed their own bidding system and had published a book together. But the Athos of their group ventured to develop "certain unsound bidding theories", so that Porthos, Aramis, and D'Artagnan combined to depose him; and they did it with the severity of a Soviet casting a Bukharin into outer darkness.

Gottlieb returned to tournament play in 1975 and won the open pairs at a regional meet in California.

Gottlieb was a Hillsborough, California, resident when he died of cancer at Peninsula Hospital in Burlingame, California, on April 8, 1980. He was survived by his wife, formerly Grayce McMahon, and two daughters.

== Publications ==
As a member of the Four Aces, Gottlieb was a co-author of their official works. Some library and bookseller records show them published by Four Aces Bridge Studio or by The Four Aces, Inc. There was one important book.

- The Four Aces System of Contract Bridge, by Oswald Jacoby, Burnstine, Michael T. Gottlieb, and Howard Schenken, 302 pp. (New York: Four Aces, 1935) OCLC 8391514; (NY: Random House, 1935) OCLC 1809201

During 1935 they also produced at least a Teacher's outline, a Pocket outline, and a "Transcript of lectures" that are in library catalogs. See David Burnstine, Publications.

== Honors ==
- ACBL Hall of Fame, von Zedtwitz Award, 1999

== See also ==
- Four Aces
