= Von der Porten =

Von der Porten is a surname. Notable people with the surname include:

- Ron Von der Porten (born 1936), American contract bridge player
- Edward Von der Porten (1933–2018), American historian and archaeologist
