= David Bruce (bridge) =

American bridge player

David Burnstine (May 5 1900 – August 26, 1965) was a leading tournament contract bridge player of the 1930s. He changed his name to David Bruce after he retired from competition in 1939.

Burnstine was born in New York City and regularly played at the Contract Bridge Club of New York. He was a member of the Four Horsemen team captained by P. Hal Sims, which he left to create his own teams, first the Bid-Rite team and later the Four Aces. The Four Aces dominated tournament play in the later half of the 1930s. Burnstine became American Contract Bridge League (ACBL) Life Master #1 at the age of 36. (Note: Burnstine and nine others were named Life Masters by the American Bridge League in 1936. The ACBL was established by mergers of competing organizations, completed late in 1937, and it continued the ABL Life Master title and master points program.)

Burnstine moved to Los Angeles in 1939, changed his name to David Bruce, and retired from regular tournament play. He died in 1965 and was inducted into the ACBL Hall of Fame as David Bruce in 1997. Thus he was the second recipient (after Sims) of the von Zedtwitz Award, a name for Hall of Fame recognition of players long out of the limelight.

== Playing record ==
Burnstine won one unofficial world championship in 1935 as the Four Aces defeated a team from France during a December fortnight in New York City.

He "won 26 national titles by 1936, the year the rank of Life Master was established":

- Vanderbilt tournament victories came as a member of the Four Horsemen team in 1931 and the Four Aces team in 1934, 1935, 1937, 1938;
- three wins in the Spingold - 1934, 1936 and 1938;
- won the American Whist League (AWL) All-American Open Teams four times: 1932 (Contract); 1931, 1932 and 1933 (Auction);
- won the United States Bridge Association (USBA) Open Teams in 1934 and 1937, the Open Pairs 1936
- won the American Bridge League (ABL) Challenge Teams in 1931, 1933 and 1937.

== Game contributions ==
- invention of the strong artificial 2♣ opening, still used by the majority of tournament players; and
- creation of intermediate two-bids in the other suits, a prominent feature of the modern-day Acol system.

== Publications ==
Books

- The Four Horsemen's One Over One Method of Contract Bidding (New York: Blue Ribbon Books, Inc., 1932), 118 pp.
- The Four Aces System of Contract Bridge (New York: Four Aces, 1935), by Oswald Jacoby, Burnstine, Michael T. Gottlieb, and Howard Schenken (the original Four Aces), 302 pp.
- Five-suit Bridge (Simon & Schuster, 1938), by Burnstine, Jacoby, Merwyn Maier, and Schenken (the Four Aces), 96 pp. OCLC 4662268

Pamphlets

- The Four Horsemen's One Over One summary of contract bidding (Blue Ribbon, 1932), 29 pp. OCLC 742301718
- Pocket solitaire bridge: play your game (New York: Trumpet Products, 1932), compiler and editor, 1 folio OCLC 756445829
- Teacher's outline of the 4 Aces system (Four Aces, 1935), by Burnstine et al., 28 pp. OCLC 668383785
- Pocket outline 4 Aces system of contract bridge (NY: Four Aces Bridge Studio, 1935), Burnstine et al., 1 folio

Lecture

- "Transcript of lectures on the four aces system: at the Four Aces Bridge Teacher's Convention, Hotel Pennsylvania, New York City, May 28, 1935" (New York, Four Aces Bridge Studio, 1935), by Burnstine, et al. – 31-page typescript OCLC 666777170

== Bridge accomplishments ==
=== Honors ===
- ACBL Hall of Fame, von Zedtwitz Award 1997

=== Wins ===
- North American Bridge Championships (17)
  - Master Individual (1) 1933
  - von Zedtwitz Life Master Pairs (3) 1931, 1933, 1936
  - Wernher Open Pairs (1) 1934
  - Vanderbilt (5) 1931, 1934, 1935, 1937, 1938
  - Spingold (3) 1931, 1933, 1937
  - Masters Team of Four (2) 1934, 1936
  - Chicago Mixed Board-a-Match (1) 1933
  - Spingold (1) 1938

=== Runners-up ===
- North American Bridge Championships
  - Master Individual (2) 1932, 1935
  - von Zedtwitz Life Master Pairs (1) 1932
  - Vanderbilt (1) 1932
  - Reisinger (1) 1931

== See also ==
- Bruce LM-5000 Pairs, annual competition for the Bruce Trophy at the ACBL North American Bridge Championships, "Summer"
- Four Aces
