= Vanderbilt Trophy =

North American Bridge Championship

The trophy is awarded for the Vanderbilt Knockout Teams national bridge championship held at the spring American Contract Bridge League (ACBL) North American Bridge Championship (NABC), its oldest continuing event.

The Vanderbilt is a team event, typically lasting seven days with each day being a knock-out round consisting of two sessions of 32 boards. The event is open and seeded.

== History ==
The history of the prestigious contest began in 1928 when the inventor of modern contract bridge, Harold Stirling Vanderbilt, put the trophy bearing his name into play. The winners list is a who's who of bridge – including Vanderbilt himself, a winner in 1932 and 1940.

Winners receive replicas of the trophy, a practice initiated by Vanderbilt from the first running, and perpetuated under the terms of his will by a $100,000 trust fund that the ACBL administers. ACBL Headquarters in Horn Lake, Mississippi, displays replicas donated by the families of Caroline Taylor, who won the Vanderbilt in 1928, and Helen Sobel Smith, a Vanderbilt winner in 1944 and 1945 as Helen Sobel.

The Vanderbilt was contested annually in New York, as a separate championship, until it became part of the ACBL spring North American Bridge Championships in 1958.

== Winners ==
Four Vanderbilt Trophy champions have successfully defended the title without change in personnel (intact), on five occasions: 1938, 1945, 1956–57, and 1976. The triple winners from 1955 to 1957 were B. Jay Becker, John R. Crawford, George Rapée, Howard Schenken, Sidney Silodor, of whom Becker and Silodor were the 1944–45 winners with Charles Goren and Helen Sobel.

Vanderbilt Trophy teams-of-four, 1928 to present
Year	Winners	Runners-up
1928	1/2. Ralph Richards, Gratz Scott, Edwin Wetzlar, Wilbur Whitehead 1/2. Abraham Brown, Mrs. Sidney Lovell, Caroline Taylor, Nils Wester	
1929	Michael T. Gottlieb, Lee Langdon, Jean Mattheys, Harry Raffel	Ralph Leibenderfer, Gratz Scott, Edwin Wetzlar, Wilbur Whitehead
1930	Ely Culbertson, Josephine Culbertson, Theodore Lightner, Waldemar von Zedtwitz	2/3. Winfield Liggett, Walter Malowan, George Reith, Howard Schenken; 2/3. Huber Boscowitz, Oswald Jacoby, Willard Karn, P. Hal Sims
1931	David Burnstine, Oswald Jacoby, Willard Karn, P. Hal Sims	Walter Malowan, Jean Mattheys, Howard Schenken, Sherman Stearns
1932	Willard Karn, P. Hal Sims, Harold Vanderbilt, Waldemar von Zedtwitz	David Burnstine, Richard L. Frey, Charles Lochridge, Howard Schenken
1933	Phil Abramsohn, Benjamin Feuer, Francis Rendon, Sydney Rusinow	Mitch Barnes, Richard L. Frey, Sam Fry, Louis H. Watson
1934	David Burnstine, Richard L. Frey, Michael T. Gottlieb, Oswald Jacoby, Howard Schenken	Huber Boscowitz, Charles Goren, Charles Lochridge, Johnny Rau
1935	David Burnstine, Michael T. Gottlieb, Oswald Jacoby, Howard Schenken, Sherman Stearns	Sam Fry, Edward Hymes Jr., Merwyn Maier, Louis H. Watson
1936	Phil Abramsohn, Irving Epstein, Harry Fishbein, Fred Kaplan	Walter Beinicke, Charles Goren, Lee Langdon, Jean Mattheys
1937	David Burnstine, Oswald Jacoby, Merwyn Maier, Howard Schenken, Sherman Stearns	B. Jay Becker, Theodore Lightner, Charles Lochridge, Harold Vanderbilt, Waldemar von Zedtwitz
1938	David Burnstine, Oswald Jacoby, Merwyn Maier, Howard Schenken, Sherman Stearns	B. Jay Becker, Edward Hymes Jr., Theodore Lightner, Charles Lochridge, Waldemar von Zedtwitz
1939	Melville Alexander, Sigmund Dornbusch, Syl Gintell, Lee Hazen, Harry Raffel	Wingate Bixby, Theodore Lightner, Robert McPherran, Mrs. S. W. Peck
1940	Edward Hymes Jr., Charles Lochridge, Robert McPherran, Harold Vanderbilt, Waldemar von Zedtwitz	Al Brodsky, Louis Lipschitz, Herbert Rosenzweig, Alexander Schultz
1941	John R. Crawford, Myron Fuchs, Robert McPherran, Sherman Stearns	B. Jay Becker, Oswald Jacoby, Theodore Lightner, Merwyn Maier, Howard Schenken
1942	Lester Bachner, Sigmund Dornbusch, Richard L. Frey, Lee Hazen, Sam Stayman	Sam Fry, Benedict Jarmel, George Rapée, Helen Sobel
1943	Harry Fagin, Harry Fishbein, Fred Kaplan, Alvin Roth, Tobias Stone	Phil Abramsohn, Morrie Elis, E. O. Keller, Charles Van Vleck, Waldemar von Zedtwitz
1944	B. Jay Becker, Charles Goren, Sidney Silodor, Helen Sobel	Richard L. Frey, Lee Hazen, Charles Lochridge, George Rapée, Sam Stayman
1945	B. Jay Becker, Charles Goren, Sidney Silodor, Helen Sobel	Edward Hymes Jr., Theodore Lightner, Howard Schenken, Sam Stayman, Waldemar von Zedtwitz
1946	John R. Crawford, Oswald Jacoby, George Rapée, Howard Schenken, Sam Stayman	Samuel Katz, Bertram Lebhar Jr., Peter Leventritt, Simon Rossant, Waldemar von Zedtwitz
1947	David Clarren, Harry Feinberg, Harry Fishbein, Larry Hirsch, Joseph Low	Lee Hazen, Samuel Katz, Bertram Lebhar Jr., Peter Leventritt
1948	Robert Appleyard, Jay T. Feigus, William Lichtenstein, Harry Sonnenblick, Albert Weiss	Ambrose Casner, Herman Goldberg, Fred Hirsch, Mrs. Ira Strasser, Albert Wolfe
1949	Morrie Elis, Harry Fishbein, Lee Hazen, Larry Hirsch, Charles Lochridge	B. Jay Becker, Myron Field, Charles Goren, Oswald Jacoby, Helen Sobel
1950	John R. Crawford, George Rapée, Howard Schenken, Sidney Silodor, Sam Stayman	B. Jay Becker, Myron Field, Charles Goren, Helen Sobel
1951	B. Jay Becker, John R. Crawford, George Rapée, Sam Stayman	Barry Cohen, Jack Hancock, Emmanuel Hochfeld, Gloria Turner, Hortense Evans
1952	Ned Drucker, Irvin Kass, Sidney Mandell, Milton Moss, Jesse Sloan	B. Jay Becker, John R. Crawford, George Rapée, Howard Schenken, Sam Stayman
1953	Richard Kahn, Edgar Kaplan, Peter Leventritt, William Lipton, Ruth Sherman	Myron Field, Charles Goren, Alvin Roth, Sidney Silodor, Helen Sobel
1954	Kalman Apfel, Francis Begley, Ned Drucker, Sidney Mandell, Milton Moss	Morrie Elis, Stanley Fenkel, Simon Rossant, Peggy Solomon, Charles Solomon
1955	B. Jay Becker, John R. Crawford, George Rapée, Howard Schenken, Sidney Silodor	Charles Goren, Boris Koytchou, Peter Leventritt, Harold Ogust, Helen Sobel
1956	B. Jay Becker, John R. Crawford, George Rapée, Howard Schenken, Sidney Silodor	Leonard Hess, Jane Jaeger, Lewis Jaeger, William M. Lichtenstein, Joseph Low
1957	B. Jay Becker, John R. Crawford, George Rapée, Howard Schenken, Sidney Silodor	Rudolf Bortstiber, Raoul Lichtenstein, Ozzie Ray, Moe Rubenfeld
1958	Harry Fishbein, Sam Fry, Leonard Harmon, Lee Hazen, Ivar Stakgold	Ralph Hirschberg, Richard Kahn, Edgar Kaplan, Norman Kay, Alfred Sheinwold, Charles Solomon
1959	B. Jay Becker, John R. Crawford, Norman Kay, George Rapée, Sidney Silodor, Tobias Stone	Charles Goren, Paul Hodge, Peter Leventritt, Harold Ogust, Howard Schenken, Helen Sobel
1960	John R. Crawford, Norman Kay, Sidney Silodor, Tobias Stone	Russell Arnold, Edith Kemp, Robert Reynolds, William Seamon, Albert Weiss, Waldemar von Zedtwitz
1961	Charles Coon, Robert Jordan, Eric Murray, Arthur Robinson	Ollie Adams, Harold Guiver, Eddie Kantar, Marshall Miles, Ron Von der Porten
1962	Larry Kolker, Carolyn Levitt, Jerry Levitt, Garrett Nash, George de Runtz	Charles Goren, Boris Koytchou, Peter Leventritt, Harold Ogust, Howard Schenken, Helen Sobel
1963	Harold Harkavy, Edith Kemp, Alvin Roth, Clifford Russell, William Seamon, Albert Weiss	Harold Guiver, Lew Mathe, Erik Paulsen, Ron Von der Porten, Edward Taylor
1964	Bob Hamman, Eddie Kantar, Don Krauss, Peter Leventritt, Lew Mathe, Howard Schenken	B. Jay Becker, Ivan Erdos, Dorothy Hayden, Kelsey Petterson, Helen Portugal, Morris Portugal
1965	Phil Feldesman, John Fisher, Jim Jacoby, Oswald Jacoby, Ira Rubin, Albert Weiss	Bobby Jordan, Edgar Kaplan, Norman Kay, Boris Koytchou, George Rapée, Arthur Robinson
1966	Phil Feldesman, Bob Hamman, Sami Kehela, Lew Mathe, Ira Rubin	Billy Eisenberg, Ivan Erdos, Bobby Goldman, Leonard Harmon, Tobias Stone
1967	Jim Jacoby, Mike Lawrence, Lew Mathe, Bobby Nail, Ron Von der Porten, Lew Stansby	Sidney Lazard, Peter Leventritt, Paul Levitt, George Rapée, Howard Schenken
1968	Bobby Jordan, Edgar Kaplan, Norman Kay, Arthur Robinson, Bill Root, Alvin Roth	Bob Hamman, Eddie Kantar, Ira Rubin, Gerald Westheimer
1969	Gerald Hallee, Paul Soloway, John Swanson, Richard Walsh	Phil Feldesman, Victor Mitchell, Ira Rubin, Sam Stayman, Tobias Stone, Gerald Westheimer
1970	Edgar Kaplan, Norman Kay, Sami Kehela, Sidney Lazard, Eric Murray, George Rapée	Billy Eisenberg, Bobby Goldman, Bob Hamman, Jim Jacoby, Mike Lawrence, Bobby Wolff
1971	Billy Eisenberg, Bobby Goldman, Bob Hamman, Jim Jacoby, Mike Lawrence, Bobby Wolff	Chuck Burger, Eddie Kantar, Kyle Larsen, Ron Von der Porten, Ira Rubin, Paul Soloway
1972	Steven Altman, Eugene Neiger, Thomas Smith, Alan Sontag, Joel Stuart, Peter Weichsel	Jack Blair, Fred Hamilton, Howard Perlman, Paul Swanson
1973	Mark Blumenthal, Bobby Goldman, Bob Hamman, Mike Lawrence, Bobby Wolff; Ira Corn (npc)	Larry T. Cohen, Billy Eisenberg, Eddie Kantar, Richard H. Katz, Bud Reinhold
1974	David Crossley, Robert Crossley, Eric Kokish, Joey Silver	Ron Andersen, Mark Feldman, Stephen Goldstein, Merle Tom, Kathie Wei
1975	Roger Bates, Larry T. Cohen, Richard H. Katz, John Mohan, George Rosenkranz	Richard Freeman, Alvin Roth, Cliff Russell, Alan Sontag, Stan Tomchin, Peter Weichsel
1976	Roger Bates, Larry T. Cohen, Richard H. Katz, John Mohan, George Rosenkranz	Malcolm Brachman, Billy Eisenberg, Bobby Goldman, Eddie Kantar, Mike Passell, Paul Soloway
1977	Mike Becker, Mark Blumenthal, Fred Hamilton, Mike Lawrence, Ron Rubin, John Swanson	Ron Andersen, Gerald Caravelli, Hugh MacLean, Milt Rosenberg, Kathie Wei
1978	Malcolm Brachman, Bobby Goldman, Eddie Kantar, Billy Eisenberg, Mike Passell, Paul Soloway	Mike Becker, Lou Bluhm, George Rosenkranz, Ron Rubin, Tommy Sanders
1979	Lou Bluhm, Richard Freeman, Mark Lair, Cliff Russell, Tommy Sanders, Eddie Wold	Ron Andersen, David Berkowitz, Jeff Meckstroth, Judi Radin, Kathie Wei
1980	Russ Arnold, Bobby Levin, Jeff Meckstroth, Bud Reinhold, Eric Rodwell	Ron Andersen, Mark Feldman, Eric Kokish, Peter Nagy
1981	B. Jay Becker, Mike Becker, Edgar Kaplan, Norman Kay, Ron Rubin	Bob Hamman, Fred Hamilton, Ira Rubin, Alan Sontag, Peter Weischsel, Bobby Wolff; Ira Corn (npc)
1982	Jim Jacoby, Mike Passell, George Rosenkranz, Eddie Wold, Jeff Meckstroth, Eric Rodwell	Marty Bergen, Larry Cohen, Jerry Goldfein, Warren Rosner, Luella Slaner
1983	Bill Root, Richard Pavlicek, Norman Kay, Edgar Kaplan	Eddie Kantar, Billy Eisenberg, Fred Hamilton, Jimmy Cayne, Alan Sontag
1984	Chip Martel, Lew Stansby, Hugh Ross, Peter Pender	Cliff Russell, Bobby Levin, Curtis Smith, Peter Nagy, David Berkowitz, Harold Lilie
1985	Ron Rubin, Mike Lawrence, Mike Becker, Peter Weichsel, Jeff Meckstroth, Eric Rodwell	Barry Crane, Bobby Nail, Dan Morse, Ira Chorush, Tommy Sanders, John Sutherlin
1986	Edgar Kaplan, Norman Kay, Bill Root, Richard Pavlicek	Jim Whitaker, Chris Compton, Ira Corush, Bart Bramley, Lou Bluhm
1987	Peter Pender, Peter Boyd, Lew Stansby, Hugh Ross, Steve Robinson, Chip Martel	Jack Schwencke, Drew Casen, Jim Krekorian, Jim Becker, Howard Chandross
1988	Eddie Kantar, Alan Sontag, John Mohan, Roger Bates	David Berkowitz, Billy Cohen, Ron Smith, Zia Mahmood
1989	Ron Rubin, Mike Becker, Bart Bramley, Bobby Levin, Lou Bluhm, Peter Weichsel	Eddie Kantar, Alan Sontag, Dan Rotman, Billy Eisenberg, Larry T. Cohen, Cliff Russell
1990	Dan Morse, John Sutherlin, Mike Kamil, Ron Gerard, Tommy Sanders, Bill Pollack	Zia Mahmood, Michael Rosenberg, Seymon Deutsch, David Berkowitz, Larry N. Cohen, Marty Bergen
1991	Steve Robinson, Peter Boyd, Kit Woolsey, Ed Manfield	Zia Mahmood, Michael Rosenberg, Seymon Deutsch, Jeff Meckstroth, Eric Rodwell
1992	Andy Goodman, John Mohan, Roger Bates, John Schermer, Neil Chambers	Steve Robinson, Peter Boyd, Kit Woolsey, Neil Silverman, Chip Martel, Lew Stansby
1993	Howard Weinstein, Peter Nagy, Dan Morse, John Sutherlin, Tommy Sanders, Russ Arnold	Cliff Russell, Sam Lev, David Berkowitz, Björn Fallenius, Mats Nilsland, Larry N. Cohen
1994	Seymon Deutsch, Gaylor Kasle, Michael Rosenberg, Zia Mahmood, Chip Martel, Lew Stansby	Ron Gerard, George Steiner, Edgar Kaplan, Norman Kay, Sidney Lazard
1995	Bill Root, Richard Pavlicek, Michael Polowan, Marc Jacobus	Ron Gerard, Mike Kamil, Joey Silver, George Steiner; Edgar Kaplan (npc)
1996	Zia Mahmood, Michael Rosenberg, Seymon Deutsch, Chip Martel, Lew Stansby	Nick Nickell, Richard Freeman, Bob Hamman, Bobby Wolff, Jeff Meckstroth, Eric Rodwell
1997	Richard Schwartz, Mark Lair, Steve Robinson, Peter Boyd, Paul Soloway, Bobby Goldman	Jimmy Cayne, Mark Feldman, Chuck Burger, Mike Passell, Michael Seamon, Alan Sontag
1998	Richard Schwartz, Mark Lair, Chip Martel, Lew Stansby, Paul Soloway, Bobby Goldman	Jimmy Cayne, Chuck Burger, Mike Passell, Michael Seamon, David Berkowitz, Larry N. Cohen
1999	George Jacobs, Ralph Katz, Peter Weichsel, Alan Sontag, Lorenzo Lauria, Alfredo Versace	Steve Robinson, Peter Boyd, Kit Woolsey, Fred Stewart, Mike Becker, Mike Kamil
2000	Nick Nickell, Richard Freeman, Bob Hamman, Paul Soloway, Jeff Meckstroth, Eric Rodwell	Richard Schwartz, Drew Casen, Zia Mahmood, Michael Rosenberg, Bobby Levin, Steve Weinstein
2001	Andrei Gromov, Alexander Petrunin, Cezary Balicki, Adam Żmudziński	George Rosenkranz, John Mohan, Sam Lev, Piotr Gawryś, Jacek Pszczoła
2002	Reese Milner, Marc Jacobus, Sam Lev, John Mohan, Jacek Pszczoła, Piotr Gawryś	Nick Nickell, Richard Freeman, Bob Hamman, Paul Soloway, Jeff Meckstroth, Eric Rodwell
2003	Nick Nickell, Richard Freeman, Bob Hamman, Paul Soloway, Jeff Meckstroth, Eric Rodwell	Richard Pavlicek, Lee Rautenberg, Barnet Shenkin, Mike Kamil, Marty Fleisher, Bob Jones
2004	George Jacobs, Ralph Katz, Norberto Bocchi, Giorgio Duboin, Lorenzo Lauria, Alfredo Versace	Richard Schwartz, Mike Becker, David Berkowitz, Larry N. Cohen, Peter Boyd, Steve Robinson
2005	Richard Schwartz, Mike Becker, David Berkowitz, Larry N. Cohen, Andrea Buratti, Massimo Lanzarotti	John Onstott, Jim Robison, Drew Casen, Chris Compton, Samuel Cohen, Jim Krekorian
2006	Fred Chang, Seymon Deutsch, Gunnar Hallberg, Zhong FU, Jack Zhao	Roy Welland, Björn Fallenius, Chip Martel, Lew Stansby, Cezary Balicki, Adam Żmudziński
2007	Björn Fallenius, Antonio Sementa, Christal Henner-Welland, Roy Welland, Cezary Balicki, Adam Żmudziński	Lou Ann O'Rourke, Marc Jacobus, Norberto Bocchi, Giorgio Duboin, Eric Greco, Geoff Hampson
2008	Boguslaw Gierulski, Krzysztof Jassem, Krzysztof Martens, Jerzy Skrzypczak; Piotr Walczak (npc)	Ron Rubin, Russell Ekeblad, Peter Weichsel, Marcin Leśniewski, Louk Verhees, Jan Jansma
2009	Ralph Katz, George Jacobs, Bobby Levin, Steve Weinstein, Waleed El Ahmady, Tarek Sadek	John Diamond, Brian Platnick, Fred Gitelman, Brad Moss, Eric Greco, Geoff Hampson
2010	Pierre Zimmermann, Franck Multon, Michel Bessis, Thomas Bessis, Geir Helgemo, Tor Helness	Marty Fleisher, Mike Kamil, Chip Martel, Lew Stansby, Bobby Levin, Steve Weinstein
2011	Marty Fleisher, Mike Kamil, Chip Martel, Lew Stansby, Bobby Levin, Steve Weinstein	Ishmael Del'Monte, David Bakhshi, Leslie Amoils, Curtis Cheek, Joe Grue
2012	Leslie Amoils, Darren Wolpert, Joe Grue, Curtis Cheek, Ishmael Del'Monte, Thomas Bessis	John Diamond, Brian Platnick, Fred Gitelman, Brad Moss, Eric Greco, Geoff Hampson
2013	Sabine Auken, Roy Welland, Morten Bilde, Dennis Bilde	Ricco van Prooijen, Louk Verhees, Sjoert Brink, Bas Drijver, Kevin Bathurst, Daniel Zagorin
2014	Nick Nickell, Ralph Katz, Bobby Levin, Jeff Meckstroth, Eric Rodwell, Steve Weinstein	Pierre Zimmermann, Franck Multon, Fulvio Fantoni, Claudio Nunes, Tor Helness, Geir Helgemo
2015	Giorgio Duboin, Zia Mahmood, Agustin Madala, Norberto Bocchi	John Diamond, Brian Platnick, Eric Greco, Geoff Hampson, Marc Jacobus, Eddie Wold
2016	Norberto Bocchi, Diego Brenner, Zia Mahmood, Giorgio Duboin, Alejandro Bianchedi, Agustin Madala	James Cayne, Michael Seamon, Alfredo Versace, Lorenzo Lauria, Antonio Sementa, Mustafa Cem Tokay
2017	Nick Nickell, Ralph Katz, Bobby Levin, Jeff Meckstroth, Eric Rodwell, Steve Weinstein	Richard Schwartz, Daniel Korbel, Boye Brogeland, Espen Lindqvist, David Bakhshi, David Gold
2018	Chip Martel, Marty Fleisher, Eric Greco, Joe Grue, Geoff Hampson, Brad Moss	Nick Nickell, Ralph Katz, Bobby Levin, Jeff Meckstroth, Eric Rodwell, Steve Weinstein
2019	Jeffrey Wolfson, Mike Becker, Peter Crouch, Steve Garner, Alexander Hydes, Mike Kamil	Nick Nickell, Ralph Katz, Bobby Levin, Jeff Meckstroth, Eric Rodwell, Steve Weinstein
2020	Cancelled due to the COVID-19 pandemic	
2021	Cancelled due to the COVID-19 pandemic	
2022	Andrew Rosenthal, Aaron Silverstein, Chris Willenken, Jan Jansma, Boye Brogeland, Christian Bakke	Vinita Gupta, Morten Bilde, Simon Cope, Emil Jepsen, Andreas Meister
2023	Steve Garner, David Gold, Joe Grue, Zia Mahmood, Brad Moss, Jeffrey Wolfson	Francisco Bernal, Leondardo Cima, Giorgio Duboin, Michael Kamil, Antonio Sementa, Alfredo Versace
2024	Nick Nickell, Steve Weinstein, Bobby Levin, Ralph Katz, Eric Greco, Geoff Hampson	John Hurd, Ron Smith, Jing Liu, Hongji Wei, Chris Compton, Kevin Bathurst

== See also ==
- Reisinger Board-a-Match Teams
- Spingold Knockout Teams

== Sources ==
- List of previous winners, Pages 6, 7. Daily Bulletin (PDF), vol. 52, March 16, 2009, archived from the original (PDF) on January 25, 2020
- 2009 winners, Page 1. Daily Bulletin (PDF), vol. 52, March 22, 2009
- Vanderbilt Knockout Teams winners. ACBL. Retrieved September 7, 2024.
