= Seymon Deutsch =

American bridge player (1935–2013)

Seymon Deutsch (May 18, 1935 – June 12, 2013) was an American bridge player. He started playing bridge as a student at the Trinity University in San Antonio, Texas, alongside Bobby Wolff, but afterwards focused on a career in business. He returned to competitive bridge in 1980s, when he started gaining successes, which include titles in Grand National Teams (1986), the Spingold Knockout Teams (1991) and three Vanderbilt Knockout Teams (1994, 1996 and 2006). He won two world titles: the 1988 World Team Olympiad in Venice and 1994 Rosenblum Cup. Deutsch was 2007 recipient of Sidney H. Lazard Jr. Sportsmanship Award. ACBL Hall of Fame player Zia Mahmood told The New York Times at the time, "There are a few people about whom never a bad word is said ... Seymon is one of them".

Deutsc was born and spent most of his life in Laredo, Texas. He and his wife Linda (née Brand) had four children. He ran a fashion store chain, Joe Brand, as well as a cattle ranch with a large operation in South Texas. He died on June 12, 2013.

== Bridge accomplishments ==
=== Wins ===
- World championships (2)
  - World Team Olympiad (1) 1988
  - Rosenblum Cup (1) 1994
- North American Bridge Championships (5)
  - Grand National Teams (1) 1986
  - Vanderbilt (3) 1994, 1996, 2006
  - Spingold (1) 1991

=== Runners-up ===
- North American Bridge Championships
  - Silodor Open Pairs (1) 1995
  - Vanderbilt (2) 1990, 1991
  - Spingold (1) 1993
