= Fall National Open Pairs =

Bridge championship

The National Open Pairs was the first national bridge championship for open pairs and was held at the fall American Contract Bridge League (ACBL) North American Bridge Championship (NABC) as a four-session matchpoint (MP) pairs event.

== History ==
Inaugurated in 1928 and contested for the Cavendish Trophy, the event lost its national rating after the 1962 NABCs being displaced by the Blue Ribbons Pairs event, renamed the Edgar Kaplan Blue Ribbon Pairs in 1999. The Open Pairs carried on as a secondary event at fall NABCs until 1971 when it was discontinued.

== Winners ==
Two Open Pairs champions successfully defended that title: Willard Karn–P. Hal Sims in 1932 and Helen Sobel–Margaret Wagar in 1948. The last winner of the Open Pairs as a premier event, B. Jay Becker–Dorothy Hayden in 1962, also won the first Blue Ribbon Pairs in 1963. No other partnership won the Open Pairs twice.

Jane and Lewis M. Jaeger won the Open Pairs as a married couple in 1945; they were also the first married couple to become Life Masters.

Since Sobel and Wagar won in 1947 and 1948, no pair of women has won either the Fall National Open Pairs to 1962 or the Blue Ribbon Pairs from 1963. Mary Jane Farell and Marilyn Johnson alone won the equally prestigious Life Master Pairs as partners, in 1978.

National Open Pairs, 1928 to 1962
Year	Winners	Runners-up
1928	Theodore Lightner, Waldemar von Zedtwitz	Ely Culbertson, Josephine Culbertson
1929	1/2. William McKenney, Ralph Richards; 1/2. Hortense Evans, Mrs. Sidney Lovell	
1930	Louise W. Bright, P. S. Germain	B. Foster, Ann W. Loftus
1931	Willard Karn, P. Hal Sims	Olga Hilliard, Louis H. Watson
1932	Willard Karn, P. Hal Sims	Oswald Jacoby, Louis H. Watson
1933	Charles A. Hall, Richard M. Wildberg	Sam Fry, Waldemar von Zedtwitz
1934	Charles Lochridge, Johnny Rau	Harry Fishbein, Herman Goldberg
1935	Edward Hymes, Oswald Jacoby	Paul D. Parcells, Charles Rilling
1936	Walter Jacobs, Ralph Kempner	Allyne Paris, John R. Smith
1937	A. Mitchell Barnes, Waldemar von Zedtwitz	Phil Abramsohn, Harry Fishbein
1938	Frank E. Bubna, Mollie Funk	Sonny Moyse, Helen Sobel
1939	Walter Jacobs, Albert Weiss	Phil Abramsohn, Morrie Elis
1940	Charles Goren, Helen Sobel	Henry Chanin, Harry Fishbein
1941	Sidney Silodor, Sally Young	Phil Abramsohn, Harry Fishbein
1942	Alvin Roth, Tobias Stone	Harry Fishbein, Waldemar von Zedtwitz
1943	Ruth Goldberg, Edith Seligman	Ned Drucker, Milton Moss
1944	Ambrose Casner, Ralph Hirschberg	Aaron Frank, Arthur S. Goldsmith
1945	Jane Jaeger, Lewis M. Jaeger	Bill Levin, Leo Roet
1946	B. Jay Becker, Sidney Silodor	David C. Carter, Frances Carter
1947	Helen Sobel, Margaret Wagar	Sam Fry, Ruth Sherman
1948	Helen Sobel, Margaret Wagar	Peter Leventritt, Edson Wood
1949	Gardner E. Goldsmith, Charles Whitebrook	B. Jay Becker, Simon Becker
1950	Mark Kelliher, Jack Kushner	Leo Roet, Edson Wood
1951	Arthur Glatt, Albert Weiss	Richard Kahn, Peter Leventritt
1952	Israel Cohen, Vic D. Zeve	Paula Bacher, Leo Roet
1953	Byron Greenberg, Harold Rockaway	David C. Carter, Curtis Smith
1954	George Heath, Paul Hodge	F. Ayres Bombeck, David C. Carter
1955	Milton Q. Ellenby, Emmanuel Hochfeld	Barbara Brier, Waldemar von Zedtwitz
1956	Ben Fain, Paul Hodge	Norman Kay, Charles J. Solomon
1957	Lew Mathe, Edward O. Taylor	Paul Allinger, Sidney Lazard
1958	John Fisher, Emma Jean Hawes	Al Roth, Tobias Stone
1959	Morton Rubinow, Sam Stayman	William Grieve, Emmanuel Hochfeld
1960	Oswald Jacoby, Curtis Smith	Simon Becker, Eugene Davidson
1961	Phil Feldesman, Ira Rubin	Jack Blair, Robert Stucker
1962	B. Jay Becker, Dorothy Hayden	Eddie Kantar, Marshall Miles
succeeded by the Edgar Kaplan Blue Ribbon Pairs

== See also ==
- Edgar Kaplan Blue Ribbon Pairs, or Blue Ribbon Pairs, successor as premier event

== Sources ==
- Francis, Henry G.; Truscott, Alan F.; Francis, Dorthy A., eds. (2001). The Official Encyclopedia of Bridge (6th ed.). Memphis, TN: American Contract Bridge League. ISBN 0-943855-44-6. OCLC 49606900.
- "Search Results: Open Pairs (1928–1962)". ACBL. Visit "NABC Winners"; select a Discontinued NABC.
- "Search Results: Open Pairs (1963–1971)". ACBL. Visit NABC Winners; select a Discontinued NABC.
