= Michael Seamon =

American bridge player

Michael Seamon (January 15, 1960 – 2017) was an American professional bridge player from Miami Beach, Florida.

Born to bridge players Rita and William Seamon, Michael was the youngest of three children. His sister, Janice Seamon-Molson, is also a nationally ranked bridge player. On September 3, 1992, his son Kevin William Seamon was born.

Seamon died suddenly in 2017 of natural causes.

== Bridge accomplishments ==
=== Awards ===
- Mott-Smith Trophy (1) 1993

=== Wins ===
- North American Bridge Championships (16)
  - Silodor Open Pairs (1) 1999
  - Blue Ribbon Pairs (1) 2003
  - Grand National Teams (6) 1997, 1999, 2000, 2002, 2004, 2014
  - Jacoby Open Swiss Teams (3) 1992, 1993, 2005
  - Mitchell Board-a-Match Teams (1) 2011
  - Chicago Mixed Board-a-Match (1) 1994
  - Reisinger (3) 2007, 2010, 2011
  - Spingold (1) 2015

=== Runners-up ===
- North American Bridge Championships
  - Lebhar IMP Pairs (1) 1989
  - Grand National Teams (2) 2003, 2005
  - Vanderbilt (2) 1997, 1998
  - Reisinger (1) 1996
  - Spingold (3) 1987, 1997, 2006
