= Billy Seamon =

American bridge player

William Edward Seamon (October 19, 1917 – April 25, 1992) was an American bridge player.

Seamon was born in Newark, New Jersey. He lived for years in Miami Beach, Florida, and died there on April 25, 1992, some time after a stroke.

One of his sons, Michael Seamon and his daughter Janice Seamon-Molson are also Bridge players.

== Bridge accomplishments ==
=== Wins ===
- North American Bridge Championships (5)
  - Grand National Teams (1) 1973
  - Vanderbilt (1) 1963
  - Chicago Mixed Board-a-Match (1) 1974
  - Spingold (2) 1956, 1963

=== Runners-up ===
- Bermuda Bowl (1) 1957
- North American Bridge Championships
  - Grand National Teams (2) 1978, 1980
  - Vanderbilt (1) 1960
  - Mitchell Board-a-Match Teams (2) 1952, 1973
  - Reisinger (1) 1954
