= Ron Gerard =

American bridge player

Ron Gerard is an American bridge player.

== Bridge accomplishments ==
=== Wins ===
- North American Bridge Championships (4)
  - Blue Ribbon Pairs (1) 1981
  - Mitchell Board-a-Match Teams (1) 1985
  - Spingold (1) 1981
  - Vanderbilt (1) 1990

=== Runners-up ===
- Cavendish Invitational Pairs (1) 1993
- North American Bridge Championships (7)
  - North American Pairs (2) 1980, 1983
  - Grand National Teams (1) 1976
  - Mitchell Board-a-Match Teams (1) 1983
  - Truscott Senior Swiss Teams (1) 2001
  - Vanderbilt (2) 1994, 1995
