= Peter Pender =

American bridge player and figure skater (1936–1990)

Peter Alexander Pender (August 10, 1936 – November 18, 1990) was an American bridge player and figure skater from Forestville, California. He died of AIDS in San Francisco, California.

Pender, who was born in Pennsylvania, was an elite figure skater who won gold medals from both the U.S. and Canadian Figure Skating Associations. In the late 1950s he traveled frequently to Montreal for skating competition, and met his 1980s bridge partner Hugh Ross there. He moved to San Francisco in 1960.

In 1966 Pender and Jeremy Flint, who had played for Great Britain in the 1965 Bermuda Bowl world championship, were regular partners in American Contract Bridge League (ACBL) competition after Flint arrived to tour the US in mid-February. "Flint created a sensation" by achieving the rank of ACBL Life Master in 11 weeks. They finished first and second in total masterpoints earned during the calendar year, recognized by the annual McKenney Trophy.

Pender was inducted into the ACBL Hall of Fame in 1998.

== Bridge accomplishments ==
=== Honors ===
- ACBL Hall of Fame, 1998
- McKenney Trophy, 1966

=== Wins ===
- North American Bridge Championships (14)
  - Nail Life Master Open Pairs (2) 1967, 1984
  - Grand National Teams (4) 1982, 1983, 1985, 1987
  - Vanderbilt (2) 1984, 1987
  - Marcus Cup (1) 1958
  - Reisinger (5) 1968, 1970, 1981, 1985, 1986

=== Runners-up ===
- North American Bridge Championships
  - Rockwell Mixed Pairs (1) 1964
  - North American Pairs (1) 1985
  - Mitchell Board-a-Match Teams (2) 1966, 1972
  - Reisinger (2) 1971, 1983
  - Spingold (1) 1974
