= Michael Rosenberg =

American bridge player (born 1954)

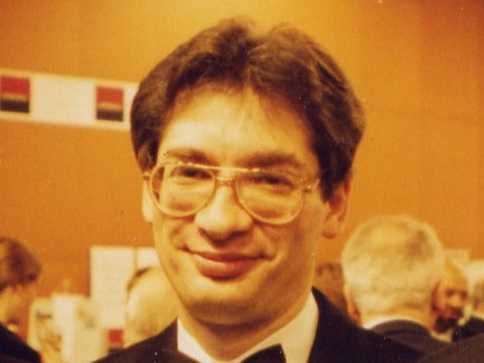
Rosenberg in 1998

Michael Rosenberg (born March 7, 1954) is an American bridge player.

Rosenberg was born in New York City, moved to Scotland as a child, and returned to New York in 1978. He lived in New York State with his wife Debbie, also a top player, from 1995 until 2011 when the couple moved to Northern California.

Michael won the 1994 Rosenblum Cup, the 2017 Bermuda Bowl, and the 2018 World Mixed Teams Championship. As of 2007 he has won fourteen North American championships, as well as multiple wins in the major invitational tournaments. He has also won the World Bridge Federation (WBF) Par competition in 1998, a test of declarer play skill, and is known for his advocacy of a high standard of ethical behavior for players. He is known as "The expert's expert" for his encyclopedic knowledge of cardplay techniques, and a frequent contributor for The Bridge World.

== Bridge accomplishments ==
=== Awards ===
- ACBL Hall of Fame, 2015
- ACBL Player of the Year 1994, 2003
- Fishbein Trophy 2003
- Herman Trophy 1996

=== Wins ===
- World Mixed Teams Championship (1) 2018
- Bermuda Bowl (1) 2017
- Rosenblum Cup (1) 1994
- Compaq World Par Contest (1) 1998
- North American Bridge Championships (14)
  - von Zedtwitz Life Master Pairs (1) 2000
  - Silodor Open Pairs (1) 2003
  - Blue Ribbon Pairs (1) 1993
  - Nail Life Master Open Pairs (1) 1992
  - Vanderbilt (2) 1994, 1996
  - Mitchell Board-a-Match Teams (3) 1991, 1996, 2006
  - Chicago Mixed Board-a-Match (1) 2002
  - Reisinger (2) 1989, 1996
  - Spingold (2) 1991, 2003
  - Roth Open Swiss Teams (1) 2022
- United States Bridge Championships (4)
  - Open Team Trials(4) 1992, 1997, 1999, 2006
- European Open Bridge Championships (1)
  - Mixed Teams (1) 2003
- European Championships (1)
  - Junior Teams (1) 1978
- British Championships (1)
  - Gold Cup (1) 1976
- Other notable wins:
  - Cavendish Invitational Teams (1) 1986
  - Cap Gemini Pandata World Top Invitational Pairs (1) 1992
  - Cap Volmac World Top Invitational Pairs (1) 1995
  - Sunday Times Invitational Pairs (1) 1976
- Cavendish Invitational Pairs (1) 1986
  - Goldman Pairs (2) 2008, 2009

=== Runners-up ===
- Bermuda Bowl (1) 2007
- World Open Team Olympiad (1) 1992
- World Open Pairs (2) 1994, 2002
- North American Bridge Championships (18)
  - von Zedtwitz Life Master Pairs (1) 2003
  - Lebhar IMP Pairs (1) 2006
  - Silodor Open Pairs (1) 1994
  - Grand National Teams (1) 1981
  - Jacoby Open Swiss Teams (2) 1992, 2014
  - Roth Open Swiss Teams (2) 2011, 2013
  - Vanderbilt (3) 1990, 1991, 2000
  - Mitchell Board-a-Match Teams (1) 2004
  - Reisinger (3) 2002, 2003, 2005
  - Spingold (3) 1980, 1993, 1995
- United States Bridge Championships (5)
  - Open Team Trials (7) 1996, 2000, 2002, 2004, 2005, 2013, 2017
- Other notable 2nd places:
  - Cavendish Invitational Pairs (1) 1978
