= Ron Andersen =

American bridge player

Ronald Eugene Andersen (May 26, 1941 – July 3, 1997) was an American bridge player. He won 11 "national"-rated events at North American Bridge Championships, thrice-annual 10-day meets organized by the American Contract Bridge League, where he became known best as a superior live commentator in the vugraph room.

Andersen was born in Cedar Falls, Iowa, and studied at the University of Iowa before beginning a professional bridge career. Eventually he owned a seat on the Chicago Board Options Exchange and he died in a Chicago hospital at age 56.

Andersen finally became a favorite commentator for European Bridge League and World Bridge Federation championships, as well as major ACBL tournaments. In the month before his death, June 1997, he worked the European Championships in Italy, from which he was flown home to Chicago after suffering two strokes in consequence of kidney failure.

Andersen co-wrote seven books related to the Precision Club bidding system with C. C. Wei, inventor of the system, or Kathie Wei.

Andersen and Sabine Zenkel traveled the world as a partnership during 1991–1992, based in Chicago. They also wrote a book, Preempts from A to Z (1993; 2nd, 1996).

== Publications ==
- — (1970). Where and How High/For People Who Hate to Read Bridge Books. Wisconsin, Illinois: Wisconsin Bridge association.
- — (1987). The Lebensohl Convention Complete in Contract Bridge. Port Chester, New York: Barclay Bridge Supplies. LCCN 88146628.

with C. C. Wei

- — (1976). Match Point Precision. New York City, New York: Monna Lisa Precision Corporation. Newly revised and expanded in 1978. ISBN 978-0876430378
- — (1976). Bidding Precisely Volume 2/Making the Most of Limited Openings. New York City, New York: Monna Lisa Precision Corporation.
- — (1977). Profits from Preempts/Bidding Precisely Volume 3. New York City, New York: Monna Lisa Precision Corporation. Reprinted in 1992 by Devyn Press, Louisville KY. ISBN 0910791376
- — (1978). Perfect Your No Trump Bidding/Bidding Precisely Volume 4. New York City, New York: Monna Lisa Precision Corporation.

with Sabine Zenkel

- — (1993). Preempts from A to Z. Stamford, Connecticut: Magnus Books. ISBN 0-9637533-0-4. LCCN 93-079256. Second edition published in 1996.

== Bridge accomplishments ==
=== Awards ===
- Mott-Smith Trophy (1) 1974
- ACBL annual masterpoints leader (4): McKenney Trophy 1977, 1980, 1983; Barry Crane Trophy, 1986

=== Wins ===
- North American Bridge Championships (11)
  - von Zedtwitz Life Master Pairs (1) 1982
  - Blue Ribbon Pairs (1) 1978
  - Nail Life Master Open Pairs (1) 1970
  - Jacoby Open Swiss Teams (1) 1989
  - Marcus Cup (1) 1965
  - Mitchell Board-a-Match Teams (1) 1974
  - Chicago Mixed Board-a-Match (1) 1971
  - Reisinger (1) 1980
  - Spingold (3) 1983, 1986, 1988

=== Runners-up ===
- North American Bridge Championships
  - Rockwell Mixed Pairs (1) 1993
  - Silodor Open Pairs (1) 1974
  - Wernher Open Pairs (1) 1983
  - Blue Ribbon Pairs (1) 1975
  - Vanderbilt (4) 1974, 1977, 1979, 1980
  - Mitchell Board-a-Match Teams (1) 1984
  - Reisinger (2) 1986, 1992
  - Spingold (1) 1990
