= Harold Lilie =

American contract bridge player

Harold J. Lilie was an American bridge player from Las Vegas, Nevada.

== Bridge accomplishments ==
=== Awards ===
- Mott-Smith Trophy (1) 1982

=== Wins ===
- North American Bridge Championships (5)
  - Lebhar IMP Pairs (1) 1995
  - Wernher Open Pairs (1) 1982
  - Mitchell Board-a-Match Teams (1) 1982
  - Chicago Mixed Board-a-Match (2) 1986, 1995

=== Runners-up ===
- North American Bridge Championships
  - Grand National Teams (1) 1995
  - Vanderbilt (1) 1984
