= Leslie Amoils =

American bridge player

Leslie Amoils is a bridge player.

== Bridge accomplishments ==
=== Wins ===
- North American Bridge Championships (2)
  - Rockwell Mixed Pairs (1) 1998
  - Vanderbilt (1) 2012

=== Runners-up ===
- North American Bridge Championships (2)
  - Spingold (1) 2013
  - Vanderbilt (1) 2011
