= Richard Pavlicek =

American bridge player

Richard Pavlicek (born 1945) is an American bridge player, teacher, and writer from Ft. Lauderdale, Florida, United States.

== Career ==
Pavlicek began to play bridge in 1964 at the age of 18 while stationed in Stuttgart, West Germany, with the US Army. Upon returning to Florida in 1966 he started to play in bridge tournaments in his spare time. Since then he has won over 400 events and accumulated more than 16,000 masterpoints. He is a Grand Life Master of the American Contract Bridge League (ACBL) and World International Master of the World Bridge Federation (WBF).

Pavlicek has won 11 North American Bridge Championships, including a record-setting three straight wins in the Reisinger Board-a-Match Teams, 1982–84. In 1990, his team mounted a come-from-behind finish to win it again. He won the prestigious Vanderbilt Trophy in 1983, 1986, and most recently in 1995 playing with a team that was arranged the day before the event. He won the inaugural 1973 Grand National Teams tournament and won the 1997 rendition too; one of his 1973 teammates was Billy Seamon and he played in 1997 with Billy's son Michael. His latest North American win was in 2004 when he and his son Rich became the first father–son partnership to win the Life Master Open Pairs.

Pavlicek has written numerous bridge textbooks and lesson materials. He and William S. Root wrote Modern Bridge Conventions, published in 1981 and still a best-seller in the bridge marketplace.

He is also a bridge columnist and composer of bridge puzzles, double-dummy problems and other novelties, which have appeared in a variety of publications. Since 1987, he has written the analysis booklet for the continent-wide ACBL "Instant Matchpoint" games.

Since 2000, Pavlicek has conducted monthly bidding polls and play contests through his website, with thousands of regular participants from over 90 countries.

== Personal ==
Richard and his wife of 40 years, Mabel, were not only a partnership in life but also in bridge teaching. Together, as the Pavlicek School of Bridge, they taught thousands of students in South Florida, some of whom won national titles. In 2006 he retired from teaching to be with his wife, who suffered from Alzheimer's disease, until her death in September 2015.

== Bridge accomplishments ==
=== Wins ===
- North American Bridge Championships (11)
  - Vanderbilt (3) 1983, 1986, 1995
  - Reisinger (4) 1982, 1983, 1984, 1990
  - Grand National Teams (2) 1973, 1997
  - Jacoby Open Swiss Teams (1) 1992
  - Life Master Open Pairs (1) 2004

=== Runners-up ===
- North American Bridge Championships (8)
  - Vanderbilt (1) 2003
  - Spingold (1) 1978
  - Grand National Teams (1) 1992
  - North American Men's Swiss Teams (1) 1984
  - Life Master Pairs (2) 1995, 1998
  - North American Pairs (1) 1982
  - Edgar Kaplan Blue Ribbon Pairs (2) 2019, 2022
- United States Bridge Championships (3)
  - Open Team Trials (3) 1984, 1987, 1992
