= Mike Kamil =

American bridge player

Michael Kamil is an American bridge player.

== Bridge accomplishments ==
=== Wins ===
- World Championships (1)
  - D'Orsi Senior Bowl (1) 2025
- North American Bridge Championships (9)
  - Reisinger (1) 2016
  - Norman Kay Platinum Pairs (1) 2013
  - Nail Life Master Open Pairs (1) 1992
  - Roth Open Swiss Teams (1) 2010
  - Vanderbilt (3) 1990, 2011, 2019
  - Mitchell Board-a-Match Teams (1) 2004
  - Roth Open Swiss Teams (1) 2005

=== Runners-up ===
- North American Bridge Championships (10)
  - Silodor Open Pairs (2) 1998, 2003
  - Jacoby Open Swiss Teams (1) 2004
  - Roth Open Swiss Teams (1) 2013
  - Vanderbilt (5) 1995, 1999, 2003, 2010, 2023
  - Mitchell Board-a-Match Teams (1) 2014
