= Bill Root (bridge) =

American bridge expert

William S. Root (December 12, 1923 – March 18, 2002) was an American professional bridge player, teacher, and writer. He was from Boca Raton, Florida.

Root was inducted into the ACBL Hall of Fame in 1997. The American Contract Bridge League observed in his citation, "Root was perhaps the best known bridge teacher in the world – and has probably taught the game to more people than anyone in history."

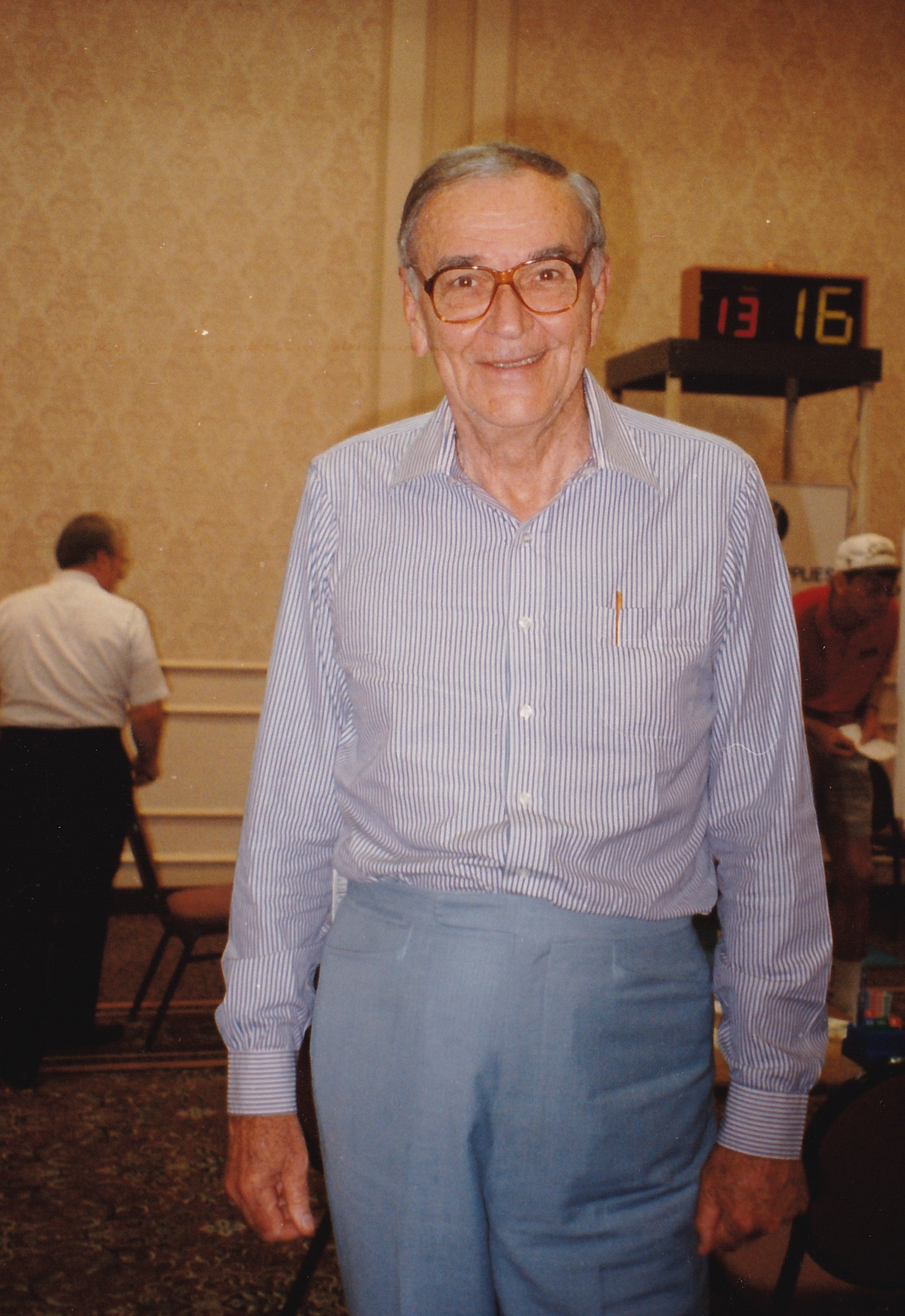
William S. (Bill) Root

== Life ==
Root was born in New York City and raised in Miami, Florida. He died at age 79 in Boca Raton, Florida.

Root appeared as himself on the November 6, 1961 episode of the CBS game show To Tell the Truth.

== Jettison play ==
One of the most famous hands in his books is a seven notrump contract requiring a very advanced jettison play. High cards often get in the declarer's way, that is they block the effective play of the hand. A solution to these blocking problems is to throw away high cards. This unblocking coup is known as the jettison play.

South in 7NT		♠♤	A Q		
South in 7NT		♥	K Q J		
South in 7NT		♦	3		
South in 7NT		♣♧	J 9 7 6 5 4 2		
♠♤	J 10 2	N W E S		♠♤	9 8 7 6 5 4 3
♥	10 8 7 4	N W E S		♥	9 6 5 3 2
♦	J 7 5 2	N W E S		♦	—
♣♧	8 3	N W E S		♣♧	10
Lead: ♠J		♠♤	K		
Lead: ♠J		♥	A		
Lead: ♠J		♦	A K Q 10 9 8 6 4		
Lead: ♠J		♣♧	A K Q		

Win the opening lead of ♠J with the ace, dropping the king of spades. Cash the queen of spades, and jettison the ace of hearts from hand. Now cash the top hearts in dummy and jettison the top three clubs from hand! You can now run the clubs to discard diamond losers. This line of play has the advantage of trying out the club suit before seeing if the diamonds run. Due to this particular hand layout, the diamonds don't run because of the 4-0 split, while the clubs run because of the singleton ♣10. If the clubs did not split favorably, declarer could still try to run the diamonds using dummy's ♦3 to get back into declarer's hand.

== Bridge accomplishments ==
=== Honors ===
- ACBL Hall of Fame, 1997

=== Wins ===
- North American Bridge Championships (14)
  - Vanderbilt (4) 1968, 1983, 1986, 1995
  - Spingold (3) 1961, 1966, 1967
  - Chicago (now Reisinger) (1) 1957
  - Reisinger (5) 1967, 1982, 1983, 1984, 1990
  - Men's Pairs (1) 1953

=== Runners-up ===
- Bermuda Bowl (1) 1967
- World Open Team Olympiad (1) 1968
- North American Bridge Championships (9)
  - Spingold (3) 1963, 1974, 1978
  - Reisinger (1) 1966
  - Grand National Teams (1) 1992
  - Men's Board-a-Match Teams (1) 1963
  - North American Men's Swiss Teams (1) 1984
  - Life Master Pairs (1) 1995
  - Open Pairs (1) 1966
- United States Bridge Championships (4)
  - Open Team Trials (3) 1984, 1987, 1992
  - Open Pair Trials (1) 1967

== Books ==
- Root, William S. (1967). Introduction to Bidding. The Alvin Landy contract bridge series. Prentice-Hall (Englewood Cliffs, N.J.), ISBN 978-0-584-10391-5; Frederick Muller (London). Both 154 pp.
- ——— (1972) [c1971]. New Contract Bridge Outlines on Standard Bidding. Crown Publishers (New York). 64 pages. OCLC 319921
- ——— (1979). Standard Bidding. Crown. ISBN 978-0-517-53622-3. 96 pp.
- ———; Pavlicek, Richard (1981). Modern Bridge Conventions. Crown, ISBN 978-0-517-54573-7; Three Rivers Press (New York), ISBN 978-0-517-88429-4; (1992) CrownTrade Paperbacks, ISBN 978-0-517-58727-0. All 244 pp.
- ——— (1986). Commonsense Bidding. Crown Publishers. ISBN 978-0-517-56130-0. Crown, ISBN 0-517-56130-1 (hardcover), ISBN 0-517-56129-8 (softcover); 1995, Three Rivers, ISBN 0-517-88430-5. 216 pp.
- ——— (1990). How To Play A Bridge Hand. Crown. ISBN 0-517-57457-8. 309 pp.
- ——— (1994). How to Defend a Bridge Hand. Crown. ISBN 0-517-59160-X. 410 pp.
- ———; Magnus, Patricia L. (1998). The ABCs of Bridge. Three Rivers. ISBN 978-0-609-80162-8. 281 pp.
