= Ron Smith (bridge) =

American bridge player (1947–2024)

Ronald L. Smith (January 22, 1947 – October 16, 2024) was an American bridge player. Smith was born in Greensboro, Alabama, on January 22, 1947, and died on October 16, 2024, at the age of 77.

== Bridge accomplishments ==
=== Wins ===
- North American Bridge Championships (7)
  - Senior Knockout Teams (1) 2015
  - Grand National Teams (1) 1996
  - Jacoby Open Swiss Teams (2) 1993, 1998
  - Blue Ribbon Pairs (1) 1979
  - Reisinger (1) 1987
  - Wernher Open Pairs (1) 2001

=== Runners-up ===
- Cavendish Invitational Pairs (2) 1985, 2001
- North American Bridge Championships (12)
  - Grand National Teams (2) 1973, 2000
  - Blue Ribbon Pairs (1) 1988
  - Mitchell Board-a-Match Teams (1) 1994
  - Fast Open Pairs (1) 2002
  - Nail Life Master Open Pairs (1) 1998
  - Reisinger (2) 1978, 2008
  - Spingold (3) 1996, 2004, 2008
  - Vanderbilt (1) 1988
