= Ishmael Del'Monte =

Australian bridge player

Ishmael Del'Monte (November 15, 1972-July 25, 2025) was an Australian bridge player. He was the Vice Chair of the WBF High Level Players Commission.

== Bridge accomplishments ==
=== Wins ===
- North American Bridge Championships (5)
  - Lebhar IMP Pairs (1) 2007
  - Nail Life Master Open Pairs (2) 2011, 2013
  - Vanderbilt (1) 2012
  - Soloway Knockout Teams (1) 2022

=== Runners-up ===
- North American Bridge Championships (3)
  - Norman Kay Platinum Pairs (1) 2012
  - Vanderbilt (1) 2011
  - Fast Open Pairs (1) 2012
