= Drew Casen =

American bridge player (born 1950)

Drew Ara Casen (born July 6, 1950) is a top 50 ranked professional bridge player.

He is a native of Forest Hills and was raised in the Lenox Hills neighborhood of Farmingdale which abuts Bethpage State Park golf course, site of the 2002 and 2009 U.S. Open and the 2019 PGA Championship. Casen took full advantage of this and became a winning Long Island golf star in high school until a sports-related injury sidelined him. His paternal grandmother had taught him card games in his early childhood, so he decided to develop his skills in this area so as to remain in competitive pursuits.

He is an accountant by formal training, his former careers being the budget director at NYU Medical School and options trading at the NY Stock Exchange. He is an all-around expert games player and has excelled in such games as bridge, poker, backgammon, golf, and bowling.

Casen is an American Contract Bridge League (ACBL) Grand Life Master and a World Bridge Federation (WBF) World International Master.

== Awards ==
- Herman Trophy 2006

== Wins ==
- North American Bridge Championships (7)
  - Baze Senior Knockout Teams (2) 2010, 2018
  - Roth Open Swiss Teams (2) 2016, 2018
  - North American Swiss Teams (1) 2001
  - Jacoby Open Swiss Teams (1) 1992
  - Master Mixed Teams (1) 1983
- Other notable wins:
  - Cavendish Invitational Teams (1) 2007
  - Cavendish Invitational Pairs (1) 1987
  - Goldman Pairs (1) 1984
  - USBF Senior Team Trials 2023

== Runners-up ==
- Rosenblum Cup (1) 1990
- North American Bridge Championships (16)
  - Baze Senior Knockout Teams (2) 2011, 2016
  - Vanderbilt (3) 1987, 2000, 2005
  - Open Board-a-Match Teams (1) 2006
  - Men's Board-a-Match Teams (2) 1982, 1988
  - North American Swiss Teams (1) 2003
  - Jacoby Open Swiss Teams (1) 1990
  - North American Men's Swiss Teams (1) 1986
  - Mixed Board-a-Match Teams (1) 2006
  - Blue Ribbon Pairs (2) 1982, 2006
  - Open Pairs I (1) 1993
  - IMP Pairs (1) 1990
- United States Bridge Championships (2)
  - Open Team Trials (1) 2000
  - Senior Team Trials (1) 2008
- Other notable 2nd places:
  - Reisinger Knockout Teams (1) 1988
  - Cavendish Invitational Pairs (1) 2007
