= Four Aces (bridge) =

Competitive bridge (cards) team

The Four Aces was a contract bridge team which dominated tournament play in the mid-thirties.

== History ==
David Burnstine (later David Bruce and to become an ACBL Hall of Fame member) was a member of the successful Four Horseman team captained by P. Hal Sims but left in 1932 to establish his own team composed of himself, Richard Frey, Howard Schenken and Charles Lockridge. Known as the Bid-Rite team, they were named for the Bid-Rite Playing Card Co., the first manufacturer of four-colored cards. The team was defeated by the Sims team in the 1932 Vanderbilt and Burnstine made roster changes, replacing Lockridge with Oswald Jacoby, whom he recruited from Sims, and adding Michael T. Gottlieb. Being a five-man team, they were referred to as the Four Aces and a Joker.

Membership varied over the years: Frey left to join Ely Culbertson's many bridge enterprises in 1935 and was replaced by Sherman Stearns; Gottlieb retired in 1936 and was replaced by Merwyn Maier; other experts participated occasionally until the team discontinued competing in late 1941. It nevertheless continued as a publication entity until 1945 including a book titled The Four Aces System of Contract Bridge.

== Bridge accomplishments ==
The Four Aces won:

- 1933 Summer Nationals at Ashbury Park, subsequently to become the Spingold
- 1934 Spingold
- 1934, 1935 Vanderbilt
- 1934, 1935 Grand National
- 1934 Reisinger
