= Richard H. Katz =

American bridge player (born 1942)

- Born: 1942 (age 83–84)
- Education: University of Wisconsin–Madison
- Occupations: Bridge player, physician

Richard H. Katz (born 1942) is an American bridge player from Rancho Mirage, California. He is also a physician and a graduate of the University of Wisconsin–Madison.

== Katz and Cohen ==
Katz and Larry T. Cohen won the collegiate bridge championship, then a pairs event, representing Wisconsin. They continued their partnership and won several major teams-of-four events together during the next decade. Playing under ACBL auspices in Houston during January 1977, they were on the verge of advancing to represent North American in the Bermuda Bowl when officials accused them of cheating. They quit the final match after 96 of 128 deals (which forced their three teammates to forfeit) and soon withdrew from the league, but subsequently sued the American Contract Bridge League for $44 million. The case was settled out of court with Katz and Cohen agreeing not to play with each other for the next two years.

== Bridge accomplishments ==
=== Wins ===
- North American Bridge Championships (11)
  - von Zedtwitz Life Master Pairs (1) 1989
  - Blue Ribbon Pairs (1) 1968
  - Nail Life Master Open Pairs (1) 1994
  - Grand National Teams (1) 1974
  - Vanderbilt (2) 1975, 1976
  - Mitchell Board-a-Match Teams (1) 1992
  - Chicago Mixed Board-a-Match (1) 1976
  - Reisinger (1) 1973
  - Spingold (2) 1973, 1976

=== Runners-up ===
- North American Bridge Championships
  - Lebhar IMP Pairs (1) 1987
  - Blue Ribbon Pairs (1) 1969
  - Vanderbilt (1) 1973
