= Edwin Kantar =

American bridge player (1932–2022)

Edwin Bruce Kantar (November 9, 1932 – April 8, 2022) was an American bridge player, winner of two open world championships for national teams (Bermuda Bowls), and prolific writer of bridge books and columns. Kantar was from Santa Monica, California.

== Biography ==
Kantar was born to a Jewish family in Minneapolis, Minnesota. He learned the game at 11 and started teaching it at the age of 17, first to his friends and later at the University of Minnesota, which he attended.

Beside the 1977 and 1979 Bermuda Bowls, Kantar won 15 North American Bridge Championships (NABCs) and was World Bridge Federation (WBF) and American Contract Bridge League (ACBL) Grand Life Master.

Kantar started writing about bridge with an article on notrump bidding in the December 1954 issue of The Bridge World. He wrote more than 35 bridge books and was a regular contributor to the ACBL Bridge Bulletin (with two monthly columns), The Bridge World, and Bridge Today. In a survey of bridge writers and players taken in 1994, Complete Defensive Play was among the top 20 of all-time favorite bridge books. Six of his books have won the American Bridge Teachers' Association (ABTA) award for Best Book of the Year.

Kantar wrote at home in California and lectured on bridge cruises. He also taught in the Los Angeles area as well as lectured several times a year in various resort areas in the U.S. and Canada.

Aside from bridge, Eddie played paddle tennis, a sport in which he also garnered several trophies. Eddie was the first person to have played in a World Bridge Championship and a World Table Tennis Championship.

Kantar died on April 8, 2022, at the age of 89.

== Bridge accomplishments ==
=== Honors ===
- ACBL Hall of Fame, 1996

=== Awards ===
- Precision Award (Best Article or Series on a System or Convention) 1981

=== Wins ===
- Bermuda Bowl (2) 1977, 1979
- North American Bridge Championships (17)
  - Marcus Cup (2) 1960, 1966
  - Vanderbilt (3) 1964, 1978, 1988
  - Spingold (4) 1961, 1962, 1973, 1978
  - Chicago (now Reisinger) (2) 1962, 1965
  - Reisinger (2) 1976, 1980
  - Grand National Teams (2) 1974, 1976
  - North American Men's Swiss Teams (1) 1987
  - Life Master Pairs (1) 1983
- United States Bridge Championships (3)
  - Open Team Trials (3) 1974, 1977, 1979
- Other notable wins:
  - Pan American Invitational Open Teams (1) 1977
  - 1981 Maccabiah Games (1) 1981

=== Runners-up ===
- Bermuda Bowl (1) 1975
- North American Bridge Championships (15)
  - Vanderbilt (7) 1961, 1968, 1971, 1973, 1976, 1983, 1989
  - Spingold (1) 1991
  - Reisinger (3) 1968, 1983, 1992
  - Men's Board-a-Match Teams (1) 1970
  - Fall National Open Pairs (1) 1962
  - Men's Pairs (2) 1962, 1967
- United States Bridge Championships (1)
  - Open Team Trials (1) 1973

== See also ==
- Edwin Kantar bibliography
