= Richard Schwartz (bridge) =

American bridge player (1943–2019)

Richard Schwartz (February 4, 1943 - February 6, 2019) was an American bridge player.

He died on February 6, 2019.

== Bridge accomplishments ==
=== Wins ===
- North American Bridge Championships (8)
  - Jacoby Open Swiss Teams (2) 1992, 2013
  - Lebhar IMP Pairs (1) 1989
  - Chicago Mixed Board-a-Match (1) 2002
  - Spingold (1) 2014
  - Vanderbilt (3) 1997, 1998, 2005

=== Runners-up ===
- World Olympiad Seniors Teams Championship (1) 2012
- Cavendish Invitational Pairs (1) 1995
- North American Bridge Championships (9)
  - Lebhar IMP Pairs (1) 1990
  - Chicago Mixed Board-a-Match (1) 2006
  - Nail Life Master Open Pairs (1) 1998
  - Reisinger (2) 2002, 2004
  - Silodor Open Pairs (1) 1993
  - Spingold (1) 1996
  - Vanderbilt (2) 2000, 2004
