= Sam Stayman =

American bridge expert

Samuel M. Stayman (May 28, 1909 – December 11, 1993) was an American bridge player, writer, and administrator. He is best known for Stayman, one of the world's most popular bidding conventions; indeed, a day after writing his obituary Alan Truscott called him "the player best known in the world".

== Life ==
Stayman was born in Worcester, Massachusetts. He graduated from Dartmouth College and from its affiliated Amos Tuck School of Business in 1930 and 1931. He became a successful textile executive (Stayman & Stayman) and portfolio management executive (Strand & Company). He lived primarily in Manhattan.

Stayman "played with enthusiasm until a few days before his death." He died of cancer at his home in Palm Beach, Florida, in 1993 at age 84. He was survived by his second wife Josephine (his first, Marjorie, had died in 1960), three daughters and a son, and several grandchildren.

== Bridge career ==
The Stayman convention was invented independently by Jack Marx and by Stayman's regular partner George Rapée. It became associated with his name because it was first published in an article written by Stayman, in The Bridge World magazine, June 1945. He also gave his name, spelled backward, to the Namyats convention, which was invented by another regular partner, Victor Mitchell.

Stayman and Rapée, John Crawford and Howard Schenken, Charles Goren and Sidney Silodor won the inaugural Bermuda Bowl in 1950, representing North America in a 3-way tournament with Great Britain and "Europe". For the next several years the event was a long head-to-head match with a European champion that might be Great Britain; Stayman, Rapée, Crawford, and Schenken won the next two in 1951 and 1953 with different teammates. Stayman also won a score of North American titles.

From 1958 to 1972, Stayman was president of the Cavendish Club of New York. As a bridge administrator, he was treasurer of the American Contract Bridge League (ACBL) from 1966 to 1969, and also served on the ACBL Charity Foundation. He was recognized as an honorary member of the ACBL in 1969 and of the American Bridge Teachers Association (ABTA) in 1979, having written at least a few books on bridge.

Stayman was Inducted into the ACBL Hall of Fame in 1996.

== Bridge accomplishments ==
=== Honors ===
- ACBL Hall of Fame, 1996
- ACBL Honorary Member of the Year 1969
- American Bridge Teachers' Association (ABTA) Honorary Member, 1979

=== Wins ===
- Bermuda Bowl (3) 1951, 1952, 1953
- North American Bridge Championships (20)
  - von Zedtwitz Life Master Pairs (1) 1965
  - Open Pairs (1928-1962) (1) 1959
  - Vanderbilt (4) 1942, 1946, 1950, 1951
  - Mitchell Board-a-Match Teams (4) 1952, 1962, 1963, 1980
  - Reisinger (3) 1945, 1953, 1984
  - Spingold (7) 1942, 1944, 1948, 1950, 1952, 1955, 1959

=== Runners-up ===
- North American Bridge Championships
  - von Zedtwitz Life Master Pairs (1) 1950
  - Wernher Open Pairs (1) 1945
  - Vanderbilt (4) 1944, 1945, 1952, 1969
  - Mitchell Board-a-Match Teams (3) 1948, 1955, 1965
  - Reisinger (5) 1947, 1948, 1950, 1976, 1977
  - Spingold (2) 1947, 1969

== Publications ==
Stayman was a contributing editor of The Official Encyclopedia of Bridge, which appeared in several editions beginning 1964. He wrote three books.

- Expert Bidding at Contract Bridge. New York: Wellington Associates, Inc. 1951. LCCN 51002419. 144 pp. – UK edition, Faber & Faber, 1952
- The Complete Stayman System of Contract Bidding. New York: Rinehart & Company, Inc. 1956. LCCN 56007005. 223 pp. – UK edition, London: Rockliff, 1956
- Do You Play Stayman?. New York: Odyssey Press. 1965. LCCN 65019848. 207 pp. – UK edition, Faber, 1969, edited and introduced by Victor Mollo OCLC 828468118

A second US edition of the latter was published as Highroad to Winning Bridge: do you play Stayman? (NY: Cornerstone Library, 1970), with a foreword by Omar Sharif. OCLC 2555487 A Chinese translation was published in 1972. OCLC 436266374

The Complete Stayman System was published at least in French (1956) and Italian (1965) translations, introduced by Pierre Albarran and Mario Franco. OCLC 68685407 OCLC 68685620
