= Jim Robison =

American bridge and poker player

Jim Robison (born 1942) is a professional American bridge and poker player from Los Angeles, California.

== Bridge accomplishments ==
=== Wins ===
- North American Bridge Championships (6)
  - Lebhar IMP Pairs (1) 1998
  - Fast Open Pairs (1) 2001
  - Silodor Open Pairs (1) 1985
  - Keohane North American Swiss Teams (2) 1979, 1990
  - Reisinger (1) 1984

=== Runners-up ===
- North American Bridge Championships
  - Rockwell Mixed Pairs (1) 1987
  - Silodor Open Pairs (1) 1980
  - Jacoby Open Swiss Teams (1) 1982
  - Vanderbilt (1) 2005
  - Senior Knockout Teams (1) 2001
