= Sidney Silodor =

American bridge player (1906–1963)

Sidney Silodor (November 13, 1906 – August 4, 1963) was an American bridge player. Silodor was a World Champion, winning the Bermuda Bowl in 1950. Silodor is currently 6th on the all-time list of North American Bridge Championships wins with 34. Silodor was a lawyer from Havertown, Pennsylvania.

Silodor was named to its hall of fame by The Bridge World in 1966, which brought the number of members to nine, and was made a founding member of the ACBL Hall of Fame in 1995. (Note: The Bridge World monthly magazine, established by Ely Culbertson in 1929, named nine members of its bridge hall of fame including Culbertson from 1964 to 1966, but it never named another. Almost thirty years later, the ACBL established its hall of fame with the Bridge World nine as founding members. It named eight new members in 1995 and has inducted others annually since then.)

Silodor was born in Newark, New Jersey to Charles and Pauline Silodor, Jewish emigrants from the Russian Empire. He was married to Elizabeth Collins. He died of brain cancer at Philadelphia's Temple University Hospital in 1963.

== Bridge accomplishments ==
=== Honors ===
- ACBL Hall of Fame, 1966

=== Awards ===
- Mott-Smith Trophy (1) 1963

=== Wins ===
- Bermuda Bowl (1) 1950
- North American Bridge Championships (34)
  - Master Individual (1) 1951
  - von Zedtwitz Life Master Pairs (1) 1946
  - Rockwell Mixed Pairs (3) 1951, 1955, 1956
  - Silodor Open Pairs (1) 1963
  - Hilliard Mixed Pairs (2) 1940, 1944
  - Fall National Open Pairs (2) 1941, 1946
  - Vanderbilt (8) 1944, 1945, 1950, 1955, 1956, 1957, 1959, 1960
  - Mitchell Board-a-Match Teams (3) 1952, 1956, 1961
  - Chicago Mixed Board-a-Match (4) 1941, 1943, 1944, 1954
  - Reisinger (6) 1942, 1943, 1950, 1954, 1956, 1961
  - Spingold (3) 1943, 1951, 1957

=== Runners-up ===
- Bermuda Bowl (2) 1958, 1961
- North American Bridge Championships
  - von Zedtwitz Life Master Pairs (2) 1943, 1956
  - Wernher Open Pairs (3) 1941, 1950, 1958
  - Vanderbilt (1) 1953
  - Spingold (1) 1936
  - Mitchell Board-a-Match Teams (3) 1946, 1959, 1963
  - Chicago Mixed Board-a-Match (4) 1946, 1952, 1960, 1962
  - Reisinger (3) 1944, 1948, 1951
  - Spingold (5) 1947, 1950, 1955, 1960, 1961

== Books ==
Silodor is sometimes credited with two books, "Silodor Says" and "According to Silodor".

- Silodor Says: the grand slam of bridge literature (New York: Pageant Press, 1952), 240 pp., OCLC 2556615
- Contract bridge: According to Silodor and Tierney, Silodor and John A. Tierney (Chestnut Hill, MA: Stanley–Allan Co., 1961), 442 pp., OCLC 5691240
- Complete Book of Duplicate Bridge, Norman Kay, Fred Karpin, and Silodor (G. P. Putnam, 1965), 496 pp., LCCN 65-22224

== Articles ==
- Lead
- Underleading an ace
