= Roth Open Swiss Teams =

North American bridge championship Swiss Teams event

The Roth Open Swiss Teams is a North American bridge championship Swiss Teams event held at the summer American Contract Bridge League (ACBL) North American Bridge Championship (NABC).

== History ==
Known originally as the Open Swiss Teams, it is a national-rated event first held in 2005 and renamed in 2010 as the Roth Open Swiss Teams in honor of Al Roth. The event is a six-session Swiss teams, with four qualifying and two final sessions, typically starting on the second Friday of the summer NABC; it is open. Scoring is by International Match Points (IMPs) that are converted to victory points.

== Winners ==
Winners of Open Swiss Teams
Year	Winners	Runners-up
2005	Christal Henner-Welland, Michael Kamil, Claudio Nunes, Fulvio Fantoni, Fredrik Nystrom, Peter Bertheau	Matin Harris, Jacob Morgan, Steve Landen, Pratap Rajadhyaksha
2006	Christal Henner-Welland, Roy Welland, Cezary Balicki, Adam Żmudziński, Antonio Sementa, Bjorn Fallenius	Nader Hanna, Nagy Kamel, Greg Hinze, Ira Hessel
2007	Lou Ann O'Rourke, Marc Jacobus, Geoff Hampson, Eric Greco, Giorgio Duboin, Norberto Bocchi	George Klemic, Drew Becker, Jason Rosenfeld, Angeliki Magklara
2008	Phil Gordon, Jason Feldman, Joshua Donn, Joergen Molberg, Terje Aa	George Jacobs, Ralph Katz, Robert Levin, Steve Weinstein, Walid Elahmady, Tarek Sadek
2009	Krzysztof Buras, Robert Hampton, John Hurd, Grzegorz Zarkiewicz, Gavin Wolpert, Joel Wooldridge	Roger Bates, Giorgio Duboin, Marc Jacobus, Lou Ann O'Rourke, Antonio Sementa, Eddie Wold
2010	Martin Fleisher, Michael Kamil, Bobby Levin, Chip Martel, Lew Stansby, Steve Weinstein	Alon Apteker, Phillipe Cronier, Craig Gower, Jacob Morgan, Michael Polowan, Adam Wildavsky
2011	Mark Gordon, Pratap Rajadhyaksha, Alan Sontag, Terje Aa, David Berkowitz, Jorgen Molberg, Allan Cokin (coach)	Aaron Silverstein, Chris Willenken, Andrew Rosenthal, Michael Rosenberg, Björn Fallenius, Peter Fredin
2012	Geoff Hampson, John Diamond, Fred Gitelman, Eric Greco, Brad Moss	Carolyn Lynch, Mike Passell, Andrew Gromov, Aleksandr Dubinin, Cezary Balicki, Adam Żmudziński
2013	Carolyn Lynch, Mike Passell, Adam Żmudziński, Cezary Balicki, Bart Bramley, Lew Stansby	Martin Fleisher, Michael Kamil, Zia Mahmood, Chip Martel, Michael Rosenberg, Chris Willenken
2014	Paul Fireman, John Kranyak, Vince Demuy, Gavin Wolpert, John Hurd, Joel Wooldridge	Tom Breed, Darren Wolpert, Jeff Roman, Daniel Korbel, Chris Compton, David Grainger
2015	Brian Platnick, John Diamond, Kevin Bathurst, Justin Lall, Geoff Hampson, Eric Greco	Nick Nickell, Ralph Katz, Jeff Meckstroth, Eric Rodwell, Steve Weinstein, Bobby Levin
2016	John Onstott, Joshua Donn, Drew Casen, Mike Passell, Chris Compton	Stan Tulin, Kevin Dwyer, Jacek Kalita, Michal Nowosadzki, Alon Birman, Dror Padon
2017	Ai-Tai Lo, Bill Pettis, Beth Palmer, Bill Cole	Mike Levine, Eddie Wold, David Grainger, Greg Hinze, Mike Passell, Chris Compton
2018	John Onstott, Magdalena Ticha, Richard Ritmeijer, James Krekorian, Bruce Ferguson, Drew Casen	Nick Nickell, Ralph Katz, Steve Weinstein, Bobby Levin, Jeff Meckstroth, Eric Rodwell
2019	Gaylor Kasle, Bartosz Chmurski, Wlodzimierz Starkowski, Piotr Tuczynski, Michal Kwiecien, Joshua Donn	Alison Wilson, Mikael Groenkvist, Ida Groenkvist, Magdalena Ticha, Richard Ritmeijer, Kent Mignocchi
2020	Cancelled due to COVID-19	
2021	Cancelled due to COVID-19	
2022	Laurence Lebowitz, Dennis Bilde, Agustin Madala, Zachary Grossack, Michael Rosenberg, Adam Grossack	Juan Castillo, Jerry Stamatov, Lynda Nitabach, Daniel Korbel, Jacek Pszczola

== Sources ==
List of previous winners, Page 2 Daily Bulletin (PDF), vol. 79–9, July 28, 2007

2007 winners, Page 1 Daily Bulletin (PDF), vol. 80–11, July 30, 2007

2008 winners, Page 1 Daily Bulletin (PDF), vol. 80–11, July 28, 2008, archived from the original (PDF) on April 11, 2014

2019 winners, Page 1 Daily Bulletin (PDF), vol. 80–11, July 29, 2019
