= Sherman Stearns =

American bridge player

Sherman Drakeley Stearns (December 27, 1899 – January 11, 1965) was an American contract bridge player from New York and a member of the championship Four Aces team.

A real estate broker, Stearns was born in Illinois but later moved to New York City, where he died in 1965.

== Bridge accomplishments ==
=== Wins ===
- North American Bridge Championships (5)
  - von Zedtwitz Life Master Pairs (1) 1938
  - Vanderbilt (4) 1935, 1937, 1938, 1941

=== Runners-up ===
- North American Bridge Championships
  - Vanderbilt (1) 1931
  - Spingold (1) 1934
  - Chicago Mixed Board-a-Match (1) 1941
  - Reisinger (1) 1934

== See also ==
- Four Aces
