= Lightner double =

The Lightner double is a conventional double in bridge, used to direct the opening lead against slam contracts. It was devised by Theodore Lightner.

The Lightner double is a call made by the partner of the player who will make the opening lead. It asks for an "unusual" opening lead. The opening lead is often crucial to the play of the hand, and the right opening lead is often the only chance for the defenders to defeat the contract. The doubler will most often have a void in a side suit, or sometimes AQ or KQ in the suit bid by the dummy. The partner is expected to find the correct lead, which might be unusual from his viewpoint; in any case, he should not lead a trump. The most common interpretation is to lead the first suit (other than trumps) bid by the opponents.

Why give up the penalty double in favor of this rather more speculative double? Simple arithmetic. If you double and defeat the contract by one trick because the opponents overstretched, you will increase your score by either 50 or 100 points (according to their vulnerability).

But, if you defeat the contract because your partner was able to find the killing lead, you will increase your score by either 1,030 or 1,480 points (assuming that the contract was 6♥️ or 6♠️).

Of course, if it's obvious that the opponents are sacrificing then the meaning of double remains as penalty because then you are expecting a two, three, or four-trick set.

In his 1945 book Why You Lose at Bridge, S. J. "Skid" Simon called it "one of the most brilliant contributions to Contract Bridge yet made".
