= Ralph Katz =

American bridge player

Ralph Katz (born 1957) is an American bridge player. Katz is from Burr Ridge, Illinois and graduated from University of Steubenville.

In 2018 he was a first-ballot selection for the ACBL Hall of Fame.

Domestically, he has won 23 North American Bridge Championships and the Open Team Trials seven times. Internationally, he has many top finishes, highlighted by a win in the 2009 Bermuda Bowl. He has three times been the runner-up in world championships (the 2010 Rosenblum Cup, the 2007 Bermuda Bowl and the 1990 World Open Pairs Championship) and also has a bronze medal from the 2000 World Bridge Teams Olympiad. Katz is a Grand Life Master of the American Contract Bridge League with over 27,000 masterpoints and a World Grand Master of the World Bridge Federation.

Katz, who was born in Pittsburgh, lived in Squirrel Hill (a large residential neighborhood in the east end of Pittsburgh) and was raised in Steubenville, first started to play bridge when he was 16. A sports enthusiast, the competitive side of bridge drew Katz to the game.

Katz's wife, Martha, is a former World Junior Teams champion (then known as Martha Benson). Both she and their son, Sam, are former winners of ACBL King or Queen of Bridge award.

== Bridge accomplishments ==
=== Awards ===
- ACBL Player of the Year 2001
- Fishbein Trophy 1981, 2001

=== Wins ===
- Bermuda Bowl (1) 2009
- North American Bridge Championships (25)
  - Vanderbilt (6) 1999, 2004, 2009, 2014, 2017, 2024
  - Spingold (3) 1981, 2001, 2002
  - Reisinger (2) 2000, 2009, 2021
  - Open Board-a-Match Teams (3) 2002, 2003, 2006
  - Jacoby Open Swiss Teams (1) 2001
  - North American Men's Swiss Teams (1) 1984
  - Master Mixed Teams (1) 1981
  - Life Master Pairs (2) 1979, 2022
  - Life Master Open Pairs (1) 2008
  - Open Pairs (1) 1986
  - Open Pairs I (2) 1996, 2003
  - IMP Pairs (1) 1999
  - Baze Senior KO (1) 2016
- United States Bridge Championships (7)
  - Open Team Trials (7) 2000, 2006, 2007, 2012, 2014, 2017 and 2018

=== Runners-up ===
- Rosenblum Cup (1) 2010
- Bermuda Bowl (1) 2007
- World Open Pairs (1) 1990
- North American Bridge Championships (17)
  - Reisinger (7) 1987, 1995, 1998, 2001, 2005, 2014, 2023
  - Grand National Teams (1) 1986
  - Open Board-a-Match Teams (2) 2001, 2012
  - North American Swiss Teams (1) 1979
  - Open Swiss Teams (3) 2008, 2015, 2018
  - Mixed Board-a-Match (1) 1997
  - Life Master Pairs (4) 1989, 2001, 2003, 2016
  - IMP Pairs (1) 2006
  - Baze Senior KO (1) 2017
  - Vanderbilt (3) 2012, 2018, 2019
- United States Bridge Championships (2)
  - Open Team Trials (2) 1989, 1999
