= Lee Hazen =

American lawyer (1904–1991)

Lee Hazen (April 2, 1904 – February 13, 1991) was an American attorney, bridge player and baseball player from New York City.

Hazen graduated from Columbia University and received a J.D. from New York University.

Hazen was inducted into the ACBL Hall of Fame in 1997.

Hazen was a partner at the law firm Dannenberg Hazen & Lake, and had been associated with the firm and its predecessors for more than 40 years. As an attorney, he was active in supporting the American Civil Liberties Union, handling many civil rights cases in the 1930s and 1940s. Hazen was also a founder of the National Lawyers Guild. He died at Mount Sinai Medical Center in Manhattan after suffering a heart attack.

== Bridge accomplishments ==
=== Honors ===
- ACBL Hall of Fame, 1997

=== Wins ===
- North American Bridge Championships (12)
  - Masters Individual (1) 1941
  - Wernher Open Pairs (1) 1945
  - Vanderbilt (4) 1939, 1942, 1949, 1958
  - Marcus Cup (1) 1953
  - Reisinger (2) 1945, 1949
  - Spingold (3) 1942, 1947, 1955

=== Runners-up ===
- Bermuda Bowl (2) 1956, 1959
- North American Bridge Championships
  - Masters Individual (1) 1940
  - von Zedtwitz Life Master Pairs (1) 1946
  - Vanderbilt (2) 1944, 1947
  - Reisinger (2) 1941, 1942
  - Spingold (2) 1945, 1958
