= Lebhar IMP Pairs =

National bridge championship

The Lebhar IMP Pairs national bridge championship is held at the spring American Contract Bridge League (ACBL) North American Bridge Championship (NABC).

The Lebhar IMP Pairs is a four-session IMP pairs event with two qualifying and two final sessions. The event typically starts on the second Thursday of the NABC. The event is open.

== History ==
The Lebhar IMP Pairs is a four-session event --- two qualifying sessions followed by two final sessions. The winners have their names inscribed on the Lebhar Trophy. Scoring is by International Match Points (IMPs).

The trophy was donated by Bertram Lebhar Jr. in 1948 in memory of his wife, Evelyn. The trophy was previously given to winners of the Mixed Teams but re-designated for the IMP Pairs by the ACBL Board of Directors. Lebhar (1907–1972), under the name of Bert Lee, earned a national reputation as a sportscaster and later as a bridge player and administrator. In private life, he owned radio and television stations in Florida. Lebhar was one of the founders of the Greater New York Bridge Association and was elected its first president in 1948. Lebhar was also a player: he won the Spingold in 1940 and the Master Mixed Teams in 1946. His team was his wife Evelyn along with Samuel Katz and Alicia Kemper.

== Winners ==
Winners of Lebhar IMP Pairs
Year	Winners	Runners-up
1987	Robb Gordon, Linda Danas	Peter Weichsel, Richard Katz
1988	Gene Freed, Mike Passell	Corinne Gellman, Jim Kirkham
1989	Richard Schwartz, Fred Hamilton	Bud Reinhold, Michael Seamon
1990	Ralph Cohen, Renee Mancuso	Richard Schwartz, Drew Casen
1991	Harvey Brody, Ralph Buchalter	Ron Freldman, Marty Shallon
1992	Vera Gama, Marcelo Branco	David Midkiff, Tom Oppenheimer
1993	Bob Klein, David Ruderman	Win Allegaert, Gary Gottlieb
1994	Tom Fox, Walter Schafer Jr.	Howard Chandross, Lee Rautenberg
1995	Steve Sion, Harold Lilie	Brad Moss, Elizabeth Reich
1996	Mike Albert, Marilyn Hemenway	Steve Beatty, Adam Wildavsky
1997	Tom Carmichael, Joel Wooldridge	Dick Bruno, Kenji Miyakuni
1998	Jim Robison, Gene Freed	Jeanne Rahmey, Gary Cohler
1999	George Jacobs, Ralph Katz	Rob Crawford, Spike Lay
2000	Ashley Bach, Stephen Burgess	Steve Beatty, George Steiner
2001	Peter Boyd, Steve Robinson	Neil Chambers, Norb Kremer
2002	Ai-Tai Lo, Alan Schwartz	William Ehlers, Rich DeMartino
2003	Steve Weinstein, Bobby Levin	Mitch Dunitz, Iftikhar Baqai
2004	Jiang Gu, Nikolay Demirev	Peter Boyd, Steve Robinson
2005	Blair Seidler, Kevin Wilson	Jón Baldursson, Þorlákur Jónsson
2006	Fred Gitelman, Geoff Hampson	Michael Rosenberg, Ralph Katz
2007	Boye Brogeland, Ishmael Delmonte	Jonathan Weinstein, Robert Heitzman Jr.
2008	Doug Doub, Adam Wildavsky	Marc Nathan, Dan Gerstman
2009	Nikolay Demirev, Nicolas L'Ecuyer	Greg Hinze, Nagy Kamel
2010	Pablo Lambardi, Pablo Ravenna	Jón Baldursson, Þorlákur Jónsson
2011	Runar Lillevik, Oyvind Ludvigsen	Jón Baldursson, Þorlákur Jónsson
2012	Hailong Ao, Jian-Jian Wang	Alexander Ladyzhensky, Irina Ladyzhensky
2013	Kent Mignocchi, Joel Wooldridge	Lewis Gamerman, Robert McCaw
2014	Radu Nistor, Iulian Rotaru	Hans Christian Graverson, Henrik Casperson
2015	Sylvia Shi, Aaron Jones	Roger Bates, Dennis Kasle
2016	Kevin Dwyer, Stan Tulin	Curtis Cheek, Arthur Crystal
2017	Chen Zhao. Jing Liu	Barry Bragin, Fred King
2018	Mark Jones, Clay Hall	Marty Seligman, Eric Rodwell
2019	Gregory Bright, Bob Zellar	Leo Weniger, Ronald Mak
2020	cancelled due to COVID-19	
2021	cancelled due to COVID-19	
2022	Tim Van De Paverd, Luc Tijssen	Guy Mendes De Leon, Thibo Sprinkhuizen
2023	Hugh Brown Jr, Emory Whitaker	Marusa Gold, Signe Buus Thomsen
2024	Erli Zhou, Jianming Dai	Giuseppe Delle Cave, Ettore Bianchi

== Sources ==
"ACBL - NABC Winners". acbl.com. ACBL. Archived from the original on 4 February 2012.

List of previous winners, Page 12 Daily Bulletin (PDF), vol. 52–7, March 19, 2009

2009 winners, Page 1 Daily Bulletin (PDF), vol. 52–9, March 21, 2009, archived from the original (PDF) on November 17, 2010
