= Myron Field =

American bridge player

Myron Field is an American bridge player.

== Bridge accomplishments ==
=== Wins ===
- North American Bridge Championships (4)
  - Reisinger (1) 1950
  - Spingold (2) 1951, 1955
  - Vanderbilt (1) 1941

=== Runners-up ===
- Bermuda Bowl (1) 1956
- North American Bridge Championships (9)
  - Masters Individual (1) 1948
  - Chicago Mixed Board-a-Match (1) 1951
  - Reisinger (1) 1951
  - Spingold (2) 1939, 1940
  - Vanderbilt (3) 1949, 1950, 1953
  - von Zedtwitz Life Master Pairs (1) 1940
