= Theodore Lightner =

American bridge player

Theodore Alexander "Teddy" Lightner (14 September 1893 – c. 22 November 1981) was an American bridge player. He developed the Lightner double, a bridge bidding convention.

Lightner was born in Grosse Pointe, Michigan, and moved to Chicago and later to New York City. He graduated from Yale University and from Harvard Law School. He was a lawyer and had a seat on the New York Stock Exchange. Apparently, he died from a heart attack days before his body was discovered in his New York apartment on November 22, 1981.

Lightner was inducted into the ACBL Hall of Fame in 1999.

According to Victor Mollo:

No man stood so close to the emperor of bridge, Ely Culbertson, as Ted Lightner... For a part of the celebrated Battle of the Century match he was Ely Culbertson's partner - it was the part during which Culbertson gained his entire advantage over Lenz. He was in the Culbertson team which defeated the British in 1930, '33 and '34, and after winning every major event in America - Spingold, Vanderbilt, Life Master Pairs - he was at the top once more as world champion in 1953.

== Contributions to bridge bidding theory ==
The Lightner Double was not his most important contribution to the development of bridge bidding, but it bears his name because Culbertson was not keen on it and so did not claim it for himself. Lightner was the first to put forward the idea that a change of suit by responder should be forcing, prior to that only a jump in a new suit having been played as forcing. Though opening two bids to show a strong hand were used at the Cavendish Club in New York, the method was not used by the top young players of the late 1920s and early 1930s. To show an exceedingly strong hand a player would sometimes open 4NT or 5 of his suit. Lightner suggested that an opening two bid should be used to announce such very powerful hands. Both the one-over-one forcing principle and strong opening two bids were enthusiastically adopted by Culbertson.

== Publications ==
- High lights of the Culbertson System (The Bridge World, 1931), 238 pp., OCLC 5236777; second ed. 1932, 242 pp., – "Theodore Alexander Lightner", OCLC 5236814
- Famous hands of the Culbertson–Lenz match (Bridge World, 1932), 483 pp. – "analyzed by Ely Culbertson, Josephine Culbertson, Theodore A. Lightner [and] Waldemar von Zedtwitz; including additional analyses by Oswald Jacoby [and] Lieut. Alfred M. Gruenther", OCLC 12407777
- Canasta for everyone, Sam Fry and Lightner (New York: Didier, 1949), 64 pp., OCLC 1650901

== Bridge accomplishments ==
=== Honors ===
- ACBL Hall of Fame, 1999

=== Wins ===
- Bermuda Bowl 1953
- North American Bridge Championships (10)
  - von Zedtwitz Life Master Pairs (2) 1932, 1935
  - Fall National Open Pairs (1) 1928
  - Vanderbilt (1) 1930
  - Masters Team of 4 (1) 1937
  - Spingold (2) 1939, 1945

earlier Asbury Park Trophy (3) 1930, 1932, 1935

=== Runners-up ===
- North American Bridge Championships
  - von Zedtwitz Life Master Pairs (2) 1931, 1947
  - Vanderbilt (5) 1937, 1938, 1939, 1941, 1945
  - Reisinger (3) 1932, 1934, 1947
  - Spingold (1) 1941

earlier Asbury Park Trophy (1) 1934
