= Richard L. Frey =

American bridge expert

- Born: Richard Lincoln Frey; February 12, 1905; New York City, US
- Died: October 17, 1988 (aged 83); New York City, US
- Other names: Dick Frey
- Known for: Bridge Player in Four Aces and Ely Culbertson

Richard Lincoln Frey (February 12, 1905 – October 17, 1988) was an American contract bridge player, writer, editor and commentator. From New York City, he died of cancer there in 1988.

An original member of the championship Four Aces team in 1932, Frey left in 1935 to join Ely Culbertson's many bridge enterprises. He was inducted into the ACBL Hall of Fame in 1997.

== Bridge accomplishments ==
=== Honors ===
- ACBL Hall of Fame, 1997

=== Wins ===
- North American Bridge Championships (6)
  - von Zedtwitz Life Master Pairs (1) 1934
  - Vanderbilt (2) 1934, 1942
  - Spingold (1) 1933
  - Masters Team of 4 (1) 1934
  - Spingold (1) 1942

=== Runners-up ===
- North American Bridge Championships
  - Masters Individual (1) 1931
  - Vanderbilt (3) 1932, 1933, 1944
  - Reisinger (1) 1935

== See also ==
- Four Aces
