= Waldemar von Zedtwitz =

German-American bridge player

- Born: 1886; Berlin, Germany
- Died: 1984 (aged 97–98); Hawaii, US
- Citizenship: American

Baron Waldemar Konrad von Zedtwitz (May 8, 1896 – October 5, 1984) was a German-born American bridge player and administrator.

== Early life ==
Von Zedtwitz was born in Berlin, Germany. His mother was Mary Elizabeth Breckinridge Caldwell, daughter of American businessman William Shakespeare Caldwell (eldest son of James H. Caldwell), one of Louisville's first millionaires by the late 1850s, and sister of Mary Gwendoline, Marquise des Monstiers-Mérinville. His father was Baron Moritz Curt von Zedtwitz, a German diplomat who belonged to the old Zedtwitz noble family, which rose under the Electorate of Saxony. His parents were married in June 1890. His father died in a boating accident on August 18, 1896, when he was just three months old.

He was educated at Berlin and Bern, and later served in the German cavalry during World War I. He became a naturalized American citizen.

== Career ==
He was a lexicographer and linguist.

Von Zedtwitz was a keen backgammon player, winning a major tournament at age 82. He lived for 47 years in New York City before relocating to Hawaii in 1977. He died in Hawaii in 1984.

He was friends with Harold Vanderbilt, the inventor of contract bridge, and became an early and enthusiastic competitor and promoter of the game, including a tour of Europe.

Von Zedtwitz was 1932 president of the American Bridge League, one of the organizations whose merger established the American Contract Bridge League (ACBL) in 1937. The ACBL credits him with saving it by his emergency service as president in 1948 and 1949. He was a founder of the World Bridge Federation.

=== ACBL Hall of Fame ===
Von Zedtwitz was inducted into its hall of fame by The Bridge World in 1966, which brought the number of members to nine. They were made founding members of the ACBL Hall of Fame in 1995. (Note: The Bridge World monthly magazine, established by Ely Culbertson in 1929, named nine members of its bridge hall of fame including Culbertson from 1964 to 1966, but it never named another. Almost thirty years later, the ACBL established its hall of fame with the Bridge World nine as founding members. It named eight new members in 1995 and has inducted others annually since then.)

=== Von Zedtwitz Award ===
The ACBL Hall of Fame established the von Zedtwitz Award to be given to living or deceased individual(s) who have achieved prominence in the game of bridge and have an outstanding tournament record but who may not have been in the limelight for a significant period of time. Each year, as many as two recipients may be selected by the Hall of Fame Committee whenever deemed appropriate.

== Bridge accomplishments ==
=== Honors ===
- ACBL Hall of Fame, 1966

=== Wins ===
- North American Bridge Championships (20)
  - Master Individual (1) 1936
  - von Zedtwitz Life Master Pairs (1) 1930
  - Wernher Open Pairs (1) 1946
  - Fall National Open Pairs (2) 1928, 1937
  - Vanderbilt (3) 1930, 1932, 1940
  - Barclay Trophy (1) 1948
  - Spingold (1) 1930
  - Masters Team of 4 (1) 1937
  - Chicago Mixed Board-a-Match (4) 1940, 1942, 1945, 1965
  - Reisinger (2) 1932, 1945
  - Spingold (3) 1941, 1947, 1953

=== Runners-up ===
- North American Bridge Championships
  - von Zedtwitz Life Master Pairs (2) 1933, 1939
  - Wernher Open Pairs (2) 1938, 1953
  - Fall National Open Pairs (3) 1933, 1942, 1955
  - Vanderbilt (6) 1937, 1938, 1943, 1945, 1946, 1960
  - Spingold (1) 1933
  - Masters Team of 4 (1) 1936
  - Mitchell Board-a-Match Teams (1) 1952
  - Chicago Mixed Board-a-Match (3) 1933, 1935, 1956
  - Reisinger (7) 1930, 1933, 1938, 1939, 1941, 1942, 1964
  - Spingold (5) 1940, 1945, 1949, 1950, 1963

== Personal life ==
In 1929, Baron Von Zedtwitz bought a duplex penthouse apartment in New York City from Lloyd C. Griscom at 812 Park Avenue, the James Edwin Ruthven Carpenter Jr. designed housing cooperative on the southwest corner of 75th Street. He lived in the apartment "with old masters decorating his walls" until he moved to Hawaii in 1977.

Zedtwitz, a lifelong bachelor, died in Hawaii on October 5, 1984 from respiratory problems following a stroke.

== See also ==
- John Lancaster Spalding
