= Merwin Maier =

American attorney and bridge player

Merwin D. "Jimmy" Maier (August 14, 1908 – February 15, 1942) was an American attorney and bridge player from New York City. He was a member of the Four Aces from 1937 until his death from an unknown virus in New York in 1942.

Maier was born into a Jewish family in Manhattan, the son of Julius Maier and Lydia B. Maier. All four of his grandparents emigrated from Germany. He attended Columbia Law School and was an editor on the Columbia Law Review.

He died at age 33 after suffering from an illness for two months. Maier was inducted into the ACBL Hall of Fame in 2004.

== Bridge accomplishments ==
=== Honors ===
- ACBL Hall of Fame, 2004

=== Wins ===
- North American Bridge Championships (9)
  - Masters Individual (1) 1939
  - von Zedtwitz Life Master Pairs (1) 1941
  - Wernher Open Pairs (1) 1940
  - Vanderbilt (2) 1937, 1938
  - Spingold (2) 1935, 1937
  - Spingold (2) 1938, 1939

=== Runners-up ===
- North American Bridge Championships
  - Masters Individual (1) 1936
  - Vanderbilt (2) 1935, 1941
  - Masters Team of 4 (1) 1936
  - Reisinger (2) 1934, 1939
  - Spingold (1) 1941

== See also ==
- Four Aces
