= Edward Hymes =

American bridge and chess player

Edward Hymes Jr. (December 4, 1908 – October 17, 1962) was an American bridge and chess player. Hymes was an attorney and was from New York City.

At age 26, he joined the ACBL Laws Commission, which stipulates the rules of bridge. His main partner was Oswald Jacoby. Like his father before him, he was also a chess player.

== Bridge accomplishments ==
=== Wins ===
- North American Bridge Championships (7)
  - Open Pairs (1928-1962) (1) 1935
  - Vanderbilt (1) 1940
  - Spingold (1) 1935
  - Masters Team of 4 (1) 1937
  - Spingold (3) 1941, 1943, 1945

=== Runners-up ===
- North American Bridge Championships
  - Vanderbilt (3) 1935, 1938, 1945
  - Spingold (1) 1933
  - Masters Team of 4 (1) 1936
  - Spingold (1) 1940
