= Ron Von der Porten =

American bridge player

Ronald P. "Ron" Von der Porten (born 1936) is an American bridge player from Orinda, California.

== Books ==
- Introduction to Defensive Bidding (Prentice-Hall, 1967), 151 pp.
- Introduction to Competitive Bidding, Charles Goren and Von der Porten (Doubleday, 1984), 179 pp.

== Bridge accomplishments ==
=== Wins ===
- North American Bridge Championships (6)
  - Blue Ribbon Pairs (1) 1986
  - Grand National Teams (1) 1982
  - Vanderbilt (1) 1967
  - Reisinger (1) 1962
  - Spingold (2) 1975, 1980

=== Runners-up ===
- Bermuda Bowl (2) 1962, 1977
- North American Bridge Championships
  - Rockwell Mixed Pairs (1) 1984
  - Blue Ribbon Pairs (1) 1965
  - Vanderbilt (3) 1961, 1963, 1971
  - Mitchell Board-a-Match Teams (1) 1970
