= Larry T. Cohen =

American bridge player

Larry T. Cohen (1943–2016) was an American bridge player. Cohen was from Palm Desert, California. He was a pharmacist and a graduate of University of Wisconsin–Madison.

== Katz and Cohen ==
Cohen and Richard H. Katz won the collegiate bridge championship, then a pairs event, representing Wisconsin. They continued their partnership and won several major teams-of-four events together during the next decade. Playing under ACBL auspices in Houston during January 1977, they were on the verge of advancing to represent North American in the Bermuda Bowl when officials accused them of cheating. They quit the final match after 96 of 128 deals (which forced their three teammates to forfeit) and soon withdrew from the league, but subsequently sued the American Contract Bridge League for $44 million. The case was settled out of court with Katz and Cohen agreeing not to play with each other for the next two years.

== Bridge accomplishments ==
=== Wins ===
- North American Bridge Championships (10)
  - Wernher Open Pairs (1) 1976
  - Blue Ribbon Pairs (1) 1968
  - Nail Life Master Open Pairs (1) 1988
  - Grand National Teams (1) 1974
  - Vanderbilt (2) 1975, 1976
  - Keohane North American Swiss Teams (1) 2001
  - Reisinger (1) 1973
  - Spingold (2) 1973, 1976

=== Runners-up ===
- North American Bridge Championships
  - Blue Ribbon Pairs (1) 1969
  - Vanderbilt (2) 1973, 1989
  - Keohane North American Swiss Teams (2) 1992, 2003
  - Mitchell Board-a-Match Teams (1) 1971

== See also ==
- Cheating in bridge
