= Jón Baldursson =

Icelandic bridge player

- Born: 12 December 1954; Reykjavík, Iceland
- Died: 9 September 2023 (aged 68)
- Known for: Bridge

Jón Baldursson (23 Desember 1954 - 9 September 2023) was an Icelandic bridge player. He won the Bermuda Bowl in 1991 in Japan. He remains the top masterpoint winner in Iceland. Jón is in the European Bridge Hall of fame in 2019.

== Bridge accomplishments ==
=== Wins ===
- World Bridge Championships (3)
  - Bermuda Bowl (1) 1991
  - Generali World Masters Individual (1) 1994
  - World Bridge Federation Mixed Teams (1) 1996
