= Richard Kahn (bridge) =

American bridge player

Richard Frederick Kahn (January 9, 1911 – May 24, 1987) was an American bridge player.

He died on May 24, 1987, of complications resulting from Parkinson's disease and heart problems at Lenox Hill Hospital. He was 75 years old and lived in Manhattan.

== Bridge accomplishments ==
=== Wins ===
- North American Bridge Championships (6)
  - Marcus Cup (1) 1953
  - Hilliard Mixed Pairs (1) 1934
  - Reisinger (1) 1949
  - Spingold (1) 1955
  - Vanderbilt (1) 1953
  - von Zedtwitz Life Master Pairs (1) 1951

=== Runners-up ===
- Bermuda Bowl (1) 1956
- North American Bridge Championships (3)
  - Open Pairs (1928-1962) (1) 1951
  - Spingold (1) 1963
  - Vanderbilt (1) 1958
