= Ron Rubin (bridge) =

American bridge player (born 1948)

Ronald D. Rubin (born May 7, 1948) is an American bridge player. He is best known for winning the 1983 Bermuda Bowl world teams bridge championship. In addition he has won 11 North American Bridge Championships. Rubin is from Las Vegas, NV.

== Bridge accomplishments ==
=== Awards ===
- Fishbein Trophy 1990
- Romex Award (Best Bid Hand of the Year) 1976

=== Wins ===
- Bermuda Bowl (1) 1983
- North American Bridge Championships (12)
  - von Zedtwitz Life Master Pairs (1) 1990
  - Silodor Open Pairs (1) 1988
  - Vanderbilt (4) 1977, 1981, 1985, 1989
  - Mitchell Board-a-Match Teams (1) 1975
  - Spingold (5) 1980, 1982, 1992, 2005, 2009
- United States Bridge Championships (3)
  - Open Team Trials (3) 1982, 1993, 2005
- Other notable wins:
  - Lancia Challenge Match (1) 1975
  - Lancia Swiss Teams (1) 1975
  - Cavendish Invitational Teams (1) 1985

=== Runners-up ===
- North American Bridge Championships (7)
  - Vanderbilt (2) 1978, 2008
  - Spingold (2) 1985, 1988
  - Reisinger (1) 1983
  - Grand National Teams (2) 1981, 1992
- United States Bridge Championships (5)
  - Open Team Trials (5) 1980, 2001, 2006, 2007, 2009
