= Edgar Kaplan =

American bridge player

Edgar Kaplan (April 18, 1925 – September 7, 1997) was an American bridge player and one of the principal contributors to the game. His career spanned six decades and covered every aspect of bridge. He was a teacher, author, editor, administrator, champion player, theorist, expert Vugraph commentator, coach/captain and authority on the laws of the game. He was the editor and publisher of The Bridge World magazine for more than 30 years (1967–1997). With Alfred Sheinwold he developed the Kaplan–Sheinwold bidding system. He was from New York City.

== Career ==
As a player, Kaplan won 25 North American Bridge Championships (NABC) and was a Grand Life Master; at his death, he had accumulated 13,974 ACBL masterpoints. In 1957, Kaplan won the McKenney Trophy (now called the Barry Crane Top 500) for most masterpoints won during the year. He was twice runner-up in the world championships: the Bermuda Bowl (1967) and the World Team Olympiad (1968). Both final session losses were to the Italian Blue Team.

His partnership with Norman Kay was one of the strongest and longest-lasting expert pairings ever.

— The Bridge World, Bridge Master: The Best of Edgar Kaplan, p. 9.

As an author, during the 1950s and 1960s, Kaplan contributed a variety of influential articles to The Bridge World (TBW). Their topics focused largely on tournament play and on the proprieties of the game. The section of the laws of bridge titled Proprieties describes the kinds of behavior that are encouraged, and those that are deprecated. In particular, communication between partners should occur only through their bids and plays, and not by the manner in which the bids and plays are made. Kaplan wrote extensively on these issues.

Kaplan also developed a new style of reporting on bridge tournaments. Prior to Kaplan's work, reports focused on the brilliancies of the players involved. If the players' mistakes were discussed at all, the report either declined to identify the perpetrator, or stressed how unusual it was for such a revered player to make any error, let alone an unwise play or call.

This policy of comrades, which expected name players to protect one another in their writings, did little to enhance bridge journalism. Kaplan's reports changed that. While they never descended to the mean-spirited, they named names and described blunders – including Kaplan's.

After acquiring TBW in 1966, Kaplan continued to write for the magazine, contributing (primarily) editorials and tournament reports. Despite his accomplishments in other areas, he is remembered particularly for the careful prose style he brought to TBW, his gift for the bon mot, the tone he set.

As a theorist, Kaplan developed the Kaplan–Sheinwold bidding system, which heavily influenced Standard American bidding (apart from Standard's use of the strong no trump) from the 1970s on: for example, much of the Precision bidding system as originally formulated was based directly on Kaplan–Sheinwold. As Jeff Rubens noted in his remembrance of Kaplan, “The foundation of Kaplan-Sheinwold is more a blending of ostensibly eclectic elements into a coherent whole than a sparkling new concept, but Edgar combined the ingredients cleverly and added some finishing touches of his own.”

As an administrator, in his capacity as the chairman of the protest committee of the Greater New York Bridge Association (GNYBA), Kaplan was able to steer between extreme views of the Proprieties. An older group of players tended to regard the Proprieties as pious nonsense, believing that it was unrealistic to demand that players bid and play in tempo: problems arise that require time to consider. A younger group demanded that violations of the proprieties be made part of a player's record. (Such violations can include, for example, fumbling with a doubleton on defense: a singleton would be played promptly, with no trace of indecision.)

Kaplan's own view, adopted by the GNYBA and subsequently by the American Contract Bridge League’s National Laws Commission, was that if a player takes an action that could have been influenced by unauthorized information, that action constitutes an offense, but not an offense that should necessarily be regarded as cheating. Instead, the incident should be handled as a procedural matter – much as accidentally exposing a card is treated as a technical violation, not as an attempt to cheat. In this way, bridge is able to apply sanctions such as score adjustment when a player allows himself to be inadvertently and subconsciously influenced by, say, his partner's hesitation. It isn't necessary to go to the extreme of accusing the player of deliberate cheating.

(Such accusations are reserved for intentional efforts to secretly communicate unauthorized information. These communications include actions such as signaling with sniffs, tapping a partner's shoes, even spreading the fingers differently according to the holding. Each of these, and others, has been attempted in national and international competition. A player found guilty of deliberate cheating is not given merely a score adjustment but is removed from the contest, from future contests, or from organized bridge entirely, depending on the severity of the offense.)

For years Kaplan served on (and chaired) regional, national and international bridge organizations in a largely successful effort to publicize the nature of ethical bridge play and to bring it to the bridge table. He chaired the ACBL's National Laws Commission for many years and was an ACBL delegate to the World Bridge Federation, often chairing its Appeals Committee.

Kaplan also served at national and international events as chief commentator, describing for the audience the bidding and play that was displayed on the Vu-Graph. Kaplan's observations were the more illuminating for his extensive knowledge of bidding systems employed by contestants, and the more entertaining for the witty commentary into which he wove the play-by-play.

As a publisher, Kaplan bought TBW from McCall Corporation in 1966 and was its editor and publisher from 1967 through 1997. TBW was founded in 1929 by Ely Culbertson, and over the years became the premier publication concerning contract bridge. TBW introduced features such as tournament reports, articles on bidding and play, quizzes featuring answers by panels of experts, and test-yourself columns. By the time that Kaplan took over, the basic structure and style of the magazine had become highly successful. But Kaplan brought Jeff Rubens into the operation as co-editor and together they improved what was already a popular, well regarded publication.

For example, although the magazine's focus is contract bridge, discussions of other topics such as the subjunctive mood and the Battle of Waterloo found their way into its pages under Kaplan's editorship. Issues of grammar, including gender and punctuation, arose because readers, accustomed to viewing TBW as what one termed a “haven of careful prose,” would write to complain about what they perceived as some misuse of English. These readers received a usually friendly, but occasionally testy, tutorial in the finer points of grammar and diction. (The topic of Waterloo arose in a lengthy, cogent and fascinating discussion of the difference between “subsequent” and “consequent,” as applied to results at the bridge table.)

Kaplan succumbed to cancer in 1997, not long after playing in his final bridge tournament. The Blue Ribbon Pairs, played at the fall NABCs, was renamed the Edgar Kaplan Blue Ribbon Pairs in 1999 to honor one of bridge's all-time great players, writers, administrators and the authority on the laws of the game.

The material in this article is based on information published in The Bridge World, particularly Jeff Rubens’ Edgar Kaplan Remembered.

== Bridge accomplishments ==
=== Honors ===
- WBF Hall of Fame 1995
- ACBL Hall of Fame, 1995
- ACBL Honorary Member of the Year 1993

=== Awards ===
- McKenney Trophy 1957
- Charles H. Goren Award (Personality of the Year) 1979
- Romex Award (Best Bid Hand of the Year) 1991
- Le Bridgeur Award (Best Played Hand of the Year) 1997 (Winning Journalist)

=== Wins ===
- North American Bridge Championships (25)
  - Vanderbilt (6) 1953, 1968, 1970, 1981, 1983, 1986
  - Spingold (2) 1967, 1968
  - Chicago (now Reisinger) (1) 1958
  - Reisinger (7) 1966, 1967, 1971, 1982, 1983, 1984, 1990
  - Men's Board-a-Match Teams (2) 1955, 1966
  - Jacoby Open Swiss Teams (1) 1997
  - Master Mixed Teams (1) 1968
  - Blue Ribbon Pairs (1) 1974
  - Life Master Men's Pairs (1) 1973
  - Open Pairs (1) 1966
  - Mixed Pairs (1) 1965
  - Master Individual (1) 1957
- Other notable wins:
  - Cavendish Invitational Teams (1) 1984

=== Runners-up ===
- Bermuda Bowl (1) 1967
- World Open Team Olympiad (1) 1968
- North American Bridge Championships (16)
  - Vanderbilt (3) 1958, 1965, 1994
  - Spingold (3) 1965, 1971, 1978
  - Reisinger (1) 1969
  - Men's Board-a-Match Teams (3) 1958, 1961, 1975
  - Jacoby Open Swiss Teams (1) 1991
  - Master Mixed Teams (2) 1959, 1968
  - Life Master Pairs (1) 1951
  - Life Master Men's Pairs (1) 1965
  - Men's Pairs (1) 1970
- United States Bridge Championships (5)
  - Open Team Trials (4) 1971, 1984, 1986, 1992
  - Open Pair Trials (1) 1966
