= P. Hal Sims =

American bridge player (1886–1949)

Philip Hal Sims (November 8, 1886 – February 26, 1949) was an American bridge player. In 1932 he was ranked by Shepard Barclay, bridge commentator of the New York Herald Tribune, the second best player in the US during the preceding year. (Barclay ranked Sims's regular partner Willard Karn first, the other two members of his Four Horsemen team third and fourth.)

According to his obituary in The New York Times, Sims was "a colorful person and a sportsman who excelled in almost whatever intellectual or athletic competition he pursued." Beside bridge and golf it mentioned "tennis, backgammon, billiards, chemin-de-fer and racing". He stood about 6 feet, 4 inches, and weighed about 300 pounds.

== Life ==
P. Hal Sims was born in Selma, Alabama, on November 8, 1886. He worked in Chicago and New York before World War I, when he was shot down on duty with the Royal Naval Air Service. Sims met the aviator Dorothy Rice (divorced, formerly Dorothy Rice Peirce) at Roosevelt Field on Long Island where he was a combat flight instructor for the United States.

The New York Times reported on October 16, 1917, that the aviatrix Dorothy Rice Peirce "seeks divorce; ... alleges non-support and cruelty". She was not a great player but she became a famous one, both as one of her expert husband's partners and for her frequent use of "psychic" bids, or "psyches". She is known for inventing the tactic and it appears that she coined the term "psychic", at least. Sims and Sims became famous as bridge partners. They won the second annual (contract bridge) Master Mixed Teams tournament in 1930, evidently with two men as teammates. (Except 1930, the winners and runners-up apparently comprised two men and two women, presumably playing as mixed pairs.) They were runners-up in 1933. In 1930 they were also runners-up in the second annual Board-a-Match Teams for the Chicago Trophy (now the Reisinger).

In the 1930s, the Sims' resided in a home in Deal, New Jersey that was described in The Brooklyn Daily Eagle as reminiscent "of the castles of the feudal barons in medieval days".

Sims took up golf seriously in 1934, one of several games he pursued seriously at one time or another. He was in critical condition for several days after July 13, 1946, when he suffered a heart attack while playing on a Long Island golf course with Tony Manero during an "amateur–professional" tournament. He died in Havana, Cuba, on February 26, 1949, evidently from a heart attack, after collapsing while playing cards with friends in his winter home.

One month after Sims' death, Albert Morehead opened a New York Times bridge column with four obituary paragraphs beginning with the observation that "[m]uch of the color went out of tournament bridge when P. Hal Sims quit championship competition along about 1936". Six years earlier, however, he had covered Sims' entry in the annual mixed teams championship at the 1943 Summer Nationals. According to Morehead it was "the first time he has played in a contest conducted by the [ACBL] since 1934. In the summer of 1934, Sims and Oswald Jacoby had a fight on the playing floor at the national tournament at Asbury Park, New Jersey. The league reprimanded them but Sims refused to accept it."

== Bridge ==
In January 1931, Sims formed the "Four Horsemen" team comprising himself, Oswald Jacoby, Willard S. Karn, and David Burnstine. The team won the Vanderbilt and Asbury Park trophies in 1932 and the Reisinger in 1933.

His record is comparable only to that of Bobby Jones in Golf and Babe Ruth in Baseball. It is estimated that he has won more than fifty percent of all tournaments he has entered. He has rarely failed to finish either first, second or third in the field.

— Publisher's Foreword, Money Contract, P. Hal Sims (Simon & Schuster, 1932), p. xiii.

Sims was the first recipient of the ACBL Von Zedtwitz Award in 1996 when he was inducted into the ACBL Hall of Fame.

== Bridge accomplishments ==
=== Honors ===
- ACBL Hall of Fame, Von Zedtwitz Award 1996
- ABL Honorary Member of the Year 1934

=== Wins ===
- North American Bridge Championships (7)
  - Vanderbilt (2) 1931, 1932
  - Asbury Park Trophy (1) 1931
  - Master Mixed Teams (1) 1930
  - Life Master Pairs (1) 1930
  - Fall National Open Pairs (2) 1931, 1932

=== Runners-up ===
- North American Bridge Championships (7)
  - Vanderbilt (1) 1930
  - Chicago (now the Reisinger) (3) 1930, 1931, 1933
  - Asbury Park Trophy (1) 1930
  - Master Mixed Teams (1) 1933
  - Life Master Pairs (1) 1933

== Publications ==
- One-over-one for Everyone (the Philip Hal Sims system), Madeleine Kerwin and Sims (New York: The Kerwin Co, 1932), 111 pp. – "The bidding tactics of the master players." OCLC 603944
- Sims, P. Hal (1932). Money Contract. New York: Simon and Schuster. OCLC 1834996., 249 pp. Expanded second edition: 1933, OCLC 11884879. Master Contract. New York: Simon and Schuster. 1934. OCLC 1835030., 348 pp.; a revised edition of Money Contract reflecting some changes in the author's system.
- The Sims Summary of Money Contract. New York: Simon and Schuster. 1933. OCLC 5848466., 69 pp.
- Pinochle Pointers (Cincinnati: US Playing Card Company, 1935), 111 pp., OCLC 574158

Pamphlets

- Rules for five suit bridge "eagle", with instructions for five suit bidding, Sims, Sam Fry, Walter Malowan, Howard Schenken (New York: 1938), 12 pp., OCLC 5848465
