= Bobby Wolff =

American bridge expert

Robert S. (Bobby) Wolff (born October 14, 1932, San Antonio, Texas) is an American bridge player, writer, and administrator. He is the only person to win world championships in five different categories. He is a graduate of Trinity University.

Wolff was an original member of the Dallas Aces team, which was formed in 1968 to compete against the Italian Blue Team which was dominant at the time. The Aces were successful and won their first world championship in 1970. Wolff has won 11 world championships, over 30 North American championships, and was the president of World Bridge Federation (WBF) 1992–1994, and served as president of American Contract Bridge League (ACBL) 1987. He is the author of a tell-all on bridge chronicling 60 years on the scene, entitled The Lone Wolff, published by Master Point Press. His column, The Aces on Bridge has been appearing daily for over 32 years, is syndicated by United Feature Syndicate in more than 130 newspapers worldwide and is available online two weeks in arrears.

Wolff lived in Dallas at the time of his induction into the ACBL Hall of Fame in 1995.

== Bridge accomplishments ==
=== Honors ===
- ACBL Hall of Fame, 1995
- ACBL Honorary Member of the Year, 1995

=== Awards ===
- Mott-Smith Trophy 1973
- Fishbein Trophy 1979

=== Wins ===
- Bermuda Bowl (7) 1970, 1971, 1977, 1983, 1985, 1987, 1995
- World Open Team Olympiad (1) 1988
- World Open Pairs (1) 1974
- Olympiad Mixed Teams (1) 1972
- Senior International Cup (1) 2000
- North American Bridge Championships (31)
  - Vanderbilt (2) 1971, 1973
  - Spingold (10) 1969, 1979, 1982, 1983, 1989, 1990, 1993, 1994, 1995, 1996
  - Reisinger (8) 1970, 1978, 1979, 1988, 1993, 1994, 1995, 2002
  - Grand National Teams (3) 1975, 1977, 1986
  - Men's Board-a-Match Teams (4) 1968, 1972, 1973, 1988
  - Senior Knockout Teams (3) 2002, 2003, 2005
  - Blue Ribbon Pairs (1) 1984
- United States Bridge Championships (16)
  - Open Team Trials (12) 1969, 1971, 1973, 1977, 1979 (Dec), 1982, 1984, 1985, 1987, 1988, 1992, 2003
  - Senior Team Trials (4) 2000, 2001, 2007, 2009
- Other notable wins:
  - Pan American Invitational Open Teams (3) 1974, 1976, 1977

=== Runners-up ===
- Bermuda Bowl (4) 1973, 1974, 1975, 1997
- World Open Team Olympiad (3) 1972, 1980, 1992
- North American Bridge Championships (15)
  - Vanderbilt (3) 1970, 1981, 1996
  - Spingold (2) 1967, 1970
  - Chicago (now Reisinger) (1) 1964
  - Men's Board-a-Match Teams (4) 1969, 1980, 1984, 1989
  - Jacoby Open Swiss Teams (1) 1992
  - Senior Knockout Teams (1) 2007
  - Life Master Pairs (2) 1960, 1968
  - Men's Pairs (1) 1976
- United States Bridge Championships (4)
  - Open Team Trials (3) 1974, 1979 (Jan), 1997
  - Senior Team Trials (1) 2008
- Other notable 2nd places:
  - Forbo-Krommenie Nations Cup (1) 1997
  - Sunday Times–Macallan Invitational Pairs (1) 1992
  - Cavendish Invitational Pairs (1) 1988

== Publications ==
- Sacrifices (Louisville: Devyn Press, 1985), Championship Bridge no. 30 – pamphlet
- Bidding Challenge: South hands (Devyn, 1986), 21 pp. OCLC 19418039
- Bidding Challenge: world championship hands, set 1, Wolff and the Aces (Devyn, 1986), 43 pp. OCLC 19418075
- The Lone Wolff: autobiography of a bridge maverick (Master Point Press, 2008), 287 pp., ISBN 978-1-897106-37-2, OCLC 182040353

Audo-video

- Bobby Wolff's Secrets of Successful Bridge (Dallas, 1987) OCLC 21503892
