= Roman Club =

Artificial bridge bidding system

Roman Club (Italian: Fiori Romano) is an artificial bridge bidding system devised in the 1950s by Giorgio Belladonna and Walter Avarelli of Italy's Blue Team. They used it to win twelve WBF World Teams Championships, three Olympiads and numerous European and National titles. A variant, Little Roman or Arno, was played by their Blue Team-mates Massimo D'Alelio and Camillo Pabis Ticci.

Once radical, Roman has long been superseded by more advanced relay systems, but it was remarkable for the ideas it introduced or fostered in the bridge world. So was teammate Eugenio Chiaradia's Neapolitan Club and its offspring, Forquet–Garozzo's Blue Club.

The convention got banned at the time for play in tournament

== Overview ==
Roman Club can be classified as a "small club" system, where 1♣ opening bid has a wide range of meanings. In Roman, it includes weak balanced hands, stronger hands with secondary club suit, and very strong hands. Other 1-bids are made in strict accordance with canapé principle (shorter suit first).

=== Opening bids ===
Roman is notable for its emphasis on distinguishing opening hands into groups by distribution and responding hands by strength. The general opening bid structure is:

- Balanced hands:
  - 1♣ 12-16p and 21+p.
  - 1NT 17-20p.
- One or two suited hands:
  - 1♦, 1♥, 1♠ 12-20p canapé openings which may be in a 3 cards if 15+p.
  - 2♥, 2♠, 2NT 12-16p canapé openings with ♣ the shorter suit and ♥, ♠, ♦ respectively the longer suit.
  - 1♣ 17-20p canapé opening with ♣ the shorter suit, rebidding 2♣ conventionally then continuing as for the openings from 2♥-2NT.
- Three suited hands:
  - 2♣ 12-16p.
  - 2♦ 17-20p.
- Unbalanced hands of 21+p (game forcing) are opened 1♣, continuing with a jump in a new suit or 2♦+ over a negative.

The general responding structure divides hands into:

- weak, typically bidding the first-step response,
- semi-positive, typically bidding and rebidding a suit or showing preference for opener's suit, and
- positive, bidding 1NT (except over 1♠) with 12-15p balanced or "reversing"—bidding a higher suit after a lower to show an unbalanced canapé hand of 12+p.

Like opener, responder may make their first bid in a 3cs to prepare a canapé.

The strong emphasis on distribution of openings simplified the bidding structure in many respects but did not overcome the classical weakness of canapé, where it is very difficult to distinguish strength range as easily as in a long-suit-first system. Opening three-card suits was also an obvious exposure in competition.

Unlike many other artificial systems, Roman does not use 2♣ bid for hands with primary or secondary club suit (2♥/2♠ offer some compensation though). As result, some hands with club suit are difficult to bid (e.g. both 1=3=4=5 and 2=2=2=7 hands have to be opened 1♦ with rebid in clubs).

The Roman bidders used a negative double only up to 1♠ overcall over their 1♣ opening, and not elsewhere, making the balanced structure also vulnerable to interference. Nonetheless, the emphasis on distribution was a lesson well-learned by later theorists in relay systems.

=== Other features ===
Some other innovations Roman collected into their system included:

- Suit asking bids. In several positions, bidding a suit in a game force asked responder to describe their length and strength in the suit using about six steps. There were variations on these asks titled Beta, Gamma and Delta, depending on context.
- Control asking bids. The Alpha ask ignored length and simply asked for Controls (Aces and Kings) in the specific suit, contrasting with more common cue bids, which show controls.
- Roman Cues and Roman Blackwood. Cue bidding aces, kings, voids and singletons more or less indiscriminately supported an aggressive and somewhat adventurous approach to slams, and area of bidding where the Blue Team invariably shone.
- Defined two-suiters in defence Both weak and strong 5-5 shapes were given defined bids in competition over one or two level openings by opponents. Taking these hands out of other defensive calls simplified other bidding.
- Exclusion bids after partner's double. In response to partner's takeout double, responder could bid their shortest suit with a semi-positive response, simplifying the process of finding a fit and enabling takeout doubles on other than classical shapes.
- Systematic light lead-directing overcalls
- 1NT overcalls on 17-20p without requiring a stop in the bid suit. These measures provided implicit strength limitation for other defensive actions as well as within these bids.
- Rusinow leads and Odd-Even signals. Leading the second-highest of touching honours and using the parity of a card to show attitude or count were both more efficient than the classical methods, and emphasised the extent to which the system was constructed as a whole, from opening through responses, slam bidding, defensive bidding and finally defensive card play.

Roman's supposed weakness in competition promulgated by advocates of the bidding systems widely promoted in North America (particularly 2/1 enthusiasts) have emphasized the supposed difficulty of clarifying strength in canapé and complain of the sheer complexity of the system (much greater than the contemporary Schenken or later Precision) led to its present obscurity in ACBL-sponsored events. Along with Blue Club, the other major Italian system, Roman has remained popular in European countries. In the 50s and 60s it was ground-breaking in its strong hand classification, artificial sequences and asking bids, which laid foundations for the Relay and Forcing Pass systems that succeeded it. Under the guidance of Benito Garozzo the basic system has undergone several major revisions which have improved its deadly accuracy in game and slam bidding.
