= Bermuda Bowl =

Biennial contract bridge world championship

The Bermuda Bowl is a biennial contract bridge world championship for national teams. It is contested every odd-numbered year under the auspices of the World Bridge Federation (WBF), alongside the Venice Cup (women), the d'Orsi Senior Bowl and the Wuhan Cup (mixed). Entries formally represent WBF zones as well as nations, so it is also known as the World Zonal Open Team Championship. It is the oldest event that confers the title of world champion in bridge, and was first contested in 1950. The Bermuda Bowl trophy is awarded to the winning team, and is named for the site of the inaugural tournament, the Atlantic archipelago of Bermuda.

The term Bermuda Bowl is sometimes used for the entire two-week event, comprising the four zonal teams and one or more concurrent lesser tournaments.

Marrakesh, Morocco hosted the latest contest in August–September 2023, where Switzerland won the title.

== Structure ==
See a description of the identical "Senior Bowl" structure or a detailed account of the 2011 event (below).

== Inauguration and evolution ==
Organized principally by Norman Bach, an accountant and bridge player from Bermuda who played for Britain, the Bermuda Bowl was the first world championship event held after World War II, and started as a competition between the US, Europe and Britain in 1950.

The first event was won by the US. After this, the Bermuda Bowl became a yearly challenge match between the US and the European champions. The format evolved progressively, with more teams and the addition of events for women and seniors. Key milestones were:

1950: The first open team event in Bermuda between the USA, Europe and Britain who played round-robin for raw scores or "total points".
1951: The next several contests were head-on matches between representatives of the American Contract Bridge League (North America) and the European Bridge League.
1958: The tournament permanently included the champions of South America.
1961: Eligibility was expanded to include the defending champions.
1966: The tournament expanded to five teams, with the addition of a representative from Asia.
1971: The field was expanded to include Australia.
1974: The World Bridge Federation inaugurated the Venice Cup for women's teams, contested four times on no fixed schedule before 1985.
1979: The defending champions were no longer eligible on that basis alone.
1981: Europe was awarded two places in the tournament. There would be nine teams if every WBF zone sent a champion team.
1983: North America joined Europe with double representation, and the host country was automatically included too, so the potential size of the field increased by two. European and North American champions would have two places in the four-team semifinal round. European and North American runners up would contend with champions of the other zones and the host country for two other semifinal slots.
1985: The Bermuda Bowl for open teams and Venice Cup for women would be contested side-by-side in tournaments with the same structure, and in a venue outside Europe and North America (maintained until 2001).

== Predecessors ==
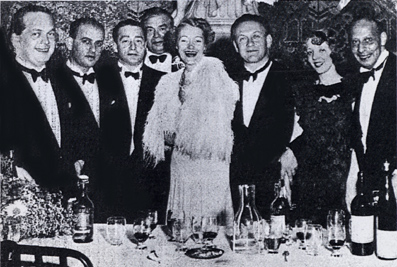
The 1937 world champion Austria open team. From left: Karl Schneider, Hans Jellinek, Edouard Frischauer, Paul Stern (Capt.), Josephine Culbertson (US), Walter Herbert, Helen Sobel (US), and Karl von Blöhdorn.

Austria won the 1937 International Bridge League (IBL) championships for both open and women's national teams. They are commonly considered the first world championships for national teams, and the first world championship tournaments of any kind, because teams from the United States entered both flights, two open teams and one women's.

The IBL was a predecessor of both the European Bridge League (est. 1947) and the WBF (est. 1958), although there was a competing international organization in the 1930s. The IBL organized annual championships for (open) national teams beginning in 1932 and for women beginning in 1935. Prior to 1937, Austria won three of five in the open category and both in the women category. All of the sites were in Europe and the European Bridge League considers the 1930s series to be the first eight European Teams Championships.

International championships under IBL auspices
Year	Site	Open		Women	
Year	Site	Rank	Team	Rank	Team
1932	Scheveningen, Netherlands	1	Austria		
1933	London, England	1	Austria		
1934	Vienna, Austria	1	Hungary		
1935	Brussels, Belgium	1	France	1	Austria
1936	Stockholm, Sweden	1	Austria	1	Austria
1937	Budapest, Hungary	1	Austria; Karl von Bluhdorn, Edward Frischauer, Walter Herbert, Hans Jellinek, Udo von Meissl, Karl Schneider; npc Paul Stern	1	Austria
1937	Budapest, Hungary	2	(United States) Culbertson; Ely Culbertson, Josephine Culbertson, Helen Sobel, Charles Vogelhofer		
1937	Budapest, Hungary	3	(United States) Minneapolis		
1937	Budapest, Hungary	3	Hungary		
1938	Oslo, Norway	1	Hungary	1	Denmark
1939	The Hague, Netherlands	1	Sweden	1	France

In the 1937 (6–20 June) open tournament there were 19 teams from 18 countries: the USA had two teams, one led by Ely Culbertson which came second.

In the knockout stage, Culbertson beat Norway and Hungary before losing to Austria. USA Minneapolis lost to Austria in the semifinal.(Morehead)

World War II practically destroyed the IBL and its nascent world championship tournament series.

With Austria the leading nation at the card table, the 1938 Anschluss of Germany and Austria was a great disruption. The leading bridge theorist and mentor Paul Stern was an outspoken opponent of Nazism; he fled to London and later became a British subject. That same year, at least Rixi Scharfstein (Markus) from the Ladies emigrated to Britain; from the Open team at least Karl von Bluhdorn to Paris, Edward Frischauer and Walter Herbert to the United States, eventually California.

The International Bridge League organized two more European championships (making eight annual tournaments for national open teams, 1932–1939) but no more tournaments or official matches involving any team from outside Europe.

== 1950s ==
=== 1950 Hamilton, Bermuda ===
The first rendition, held at the Castle Harbor Hotel 13 to 16 November, featured three teams who played round-robin for raw scores or "total points". The USA team won both of its matches, by 4,720 points over Europe (also referred to as Sweden-Iceland featuring two pairs from Sweden and one from Iceland) and 3,660 points over Great Britain; Europe defeated Great Britain by 1,940 points.

Year	Entries	Rank	
1950	3	1	(United States) USA; John Crawford, Charles Goren, George Rapée, Howard Schenken, Sidney Silodor, Sam Stayman
		2	(Sweden) (Iceland) Europe; Gunnar Guðmundsson (ISL), Rudolf Kock (SWE), Nils-Olof Lilliehöök (SWE), Einar Þorfinnsson (ISL), Einar Werner (SWE) (c), Jan Wohlin (SWE)
		3	(United Kingdom) Great Britain; Leslie Dodds, Nico Gardener, Maurice Harrison-Gray (c), Kenneth Konstam, Joel Tarlo, Louis Tarlo

=== 1951 Naples, Italy ===
Held 11 to 17 November, the match was between representatives of the American Contract Bridge League (North America) and the European Bridge League consisting of 320 boards using the 15-point International Match Point (IMP) scaling table for the first time. The USA team won by 116 IMPs.

Year	Entries	Rank	
1951	2	1	(United States) USA; B. Jay Becker, John Crawford, George Rapée, Howard Schenken, Sam Stayman, Julius Rosenblum (npc)
		2	(Italy) Italy; Paolo Baroni, Eugenio Chiaradia, Pietro Forquet, Mario Franco, Augusto Ricci, Guglielmo Siniscalco, Carl'Alberto Perroux (npc)

=== 1953 New York City, USA ===
The United States team won its third consecutive championship by 8,260 points. Crawford, Rapée, Schenken, and Stayman were also members of the previous two winning teams. The 256 boards were played against Sweden at the Sherry-Netherlands Hotel in New York, 5 to 10 January 1953.

Year	Entries	Rank	
1953	2	1	(United States) USA; B. Jay Becker, John Crawford, Theodore Lightner, George Rapée, Howard Schenken, Sam Stayman, Joseph Cohan (npc)
		2	(Sweden) Sweden; Gunnar Anulf, Rudolf Kock, Robert Larsen, Nils-Olof Lilliehöök, Einar Werner (c), Jan Wohlin

=== 1954 Monte Carlo, Monaco ===
France won the 1953 European championship with a six-man national team and the right to represent Europe in the Bermuda Bowl to be held 9–14 January 1954. Jean Besse of Switzerland and Karl Schneider of Austria replaced one of the French pairs; the team is also referred to as France. Schneider had been a member of the 1937 world champion Austrian team. The USA team had won the right to represent that country by winning the ACBL summer nationals held in St. Louis in August 1953; the five members of that team invited Lew Mathe to round out the team to six first-timers for the Bermuda Bowl event.

The USA defeated Europe by 49 IMPs representing 4,400 points.

Year	Entries	Rank	
1954	2	1	(United States) USA; Clifford Bishop, Milton Ellenby, Lew Mathe, Don Oakie, William Rosen, Douglas Steen, Benjamin Johnson (npc)
		2	(France) (Austria) (Switzerland) Europe; Jacques Amouraben (FRA), René Bacherich (FRA), Jean Besse (SUI), Pierre Ghestem (FRA), Marcel Kornblum (FRA), Karl Schneider (AUT)

=== 1955 New York City, USA ===
The 1955 event was held 9–14 January at the Hotel Beekman, New York. The British team had defeated 13 others to win the European title in 1954 in Montreux, Switzerland. The American team had won the 1954 ACBL summer nationals in Washington, D.C.; that team of five was augmented by Alvin Roth.

Great Britain won by a margin of 5,420 points.

Year	Entries	Rank	
1955	2	1	(United Kingdom) Great Britain; Leslie Dodds, Kenneth Konstam, Adam Meredith, Jordanis Pavlides, Terence Reese, Boris Schapiro, Reginald Corwen (npc)
		2	(United States) USA; Clifford Bishop, Milton Ellenby, Lew Mathe, John Moran, William Rosen, Alvin Roth, Peter Leventritt (npc)

=== 1956 Paris, France ===
France made it two in a row for Europe. Bacherich and Ghestem were veterans from 1954.

Year	Entries	Rank	
1956	2	1	(France) France; René Bacherich, Pierre Ghestem, Pierre Jaïs, Robert Lattès, Bertrand Romanet, Roger Trézel
		2	(United States) USA; Myron Field, Charles Goren, Lee Hazen, Richard Kahn, Charles Solomon, Sam Stayman

=== 1957 New York City, USA ===
Italy's Blue Team won its first of ten consecutive Bermuda Bowls. Chiaradia, Forquet, Siniscalco, and captain Carl'Alberto Perroux were veterans from the 1951 team. Avarelli, Belladona, D'Alelio, and Forquet played in every one.

Year	Entries	Rank	
1957	2	1	(Italy) Italy; Walter Avarelli, Giorgio Belladonna, Eugenio Chiaradia, Massimo D'Alelio, Pietro Forquet, Guglielmo Siniscalco
		2	(United States) USA; Charles Goren, Boris Koytchou, Peter Leventritt, Harold Ogust, William Seamon, Helen Sobel

=== 1958 Como, Italy ===
For 1958 the Bermuda Bowl tournament permanently included the champion of South America, whose federation and annual tournament were then ten years old. In the next several years, expansion covered other geographic zones and the defending champion.

Year	Entries	Rank	
1958	3	1	(Italy) Italy; Walter Avarelli, Giorgio Belladonna, Eugenio Chiaradia, Massimo D'Alelio, Pietro Forquet, Guglielmo Siniscalco
		2	(United States) USA; B. Jay Becker, John Crawford, George Rapée, Alvin Roth, Sidney Silodor, Tobias Stone
		3	(Argentina) Argentina; Alberto Blousson, Carlos Cabanne, Ricardo Calvente, Alejandro Castro, Marcelo Lerner

=== 1959 New York City, USA ===
Year	Entries	Rank	
1959	3	1	(Italy) Italy; Walter Avarelli, Giorgio Belladonna, Eugenio Chiaradia, Massimo D'Alelio, Pietro Forquet, Guglielmo Siniscalco
		2	(United States) North America; Harry Fishbein (USA), Sam Fry Jr. (USA), Leonard Harmon (USA), Lee Hazen (USA), Sidney Lazard (USA), Ivar Stakgold (USA)
		3	(Argentina) Argentina; Alberto Berisso, Ricardo Calvente, Alejandro Castro, Carlos Dibar, Arturo Jaques, Egisto Rocchi

== 1960s ==
There was no Bermuda Bowl in 1960, 1964 or 1968 to avoid conflict with the World Team Olympiad.

=== 1961 Buenos Aires, Argentina ===
The Blue Team won its fourth Bermuda Bowl, with Benito Garozzo now in the same lineup. This began a new string of annual world championships for Italy, after ranking only sixth in the inaugural World Team Olympiad, won by France.

At the same time, the Bermuda Bowl tournament expanded to include the defending champions. Throughout the 1960s that would mean Italy plus one from the rest of Europe. Italy would use the European Team Championships to give some international experience to new players or new partnerships.

Year	Entries	Rank	
1961	4	1.	(Italy) Italy; Walter Avarelli, Giorgio Belladonna, Eugenio Chiaradia, Massimo D'Alelio, Pietro Forquet, Benito Garozzo
		2.	(United States) North America; John Gerber (USA), Paul Hodge (USA), Norman Kay (USA), Peter Leventritt (USA), Howard Schenken (USA), Sidney Silodor (USA)
		3.	(France) France; René Bacherich, Claude Deruy, Pierre Ghestem, José Le Dentu, Roger Trézel

Argentina finished fourth.

=== 1962 New York City, USA ===
Year	Entries	Rank	
1962	4	1.	(Italy) Italy; Walter Avarelli, Giorgio Belladonna, Eugenio Chiaradia, Massimo D'Alelio, Pietro Forquet, Benito Garozzo
		2.	(United States) (Canada) North America; Charles Coon (USA), Mervin Key (USA), Lew Mathe (USA), Eric Murray (CAN), G. Robert Nail (USA), Ron Von der Porten (USA), John Gerber, npc (USA)
		3.	(United Kingdom) Great Britain; Nico Gardener, Kenneth Konstam, Tony Priday, Claude Rodrigue, Albert Rose, Alan Truscott

Argentina finished fourth.

=== 1963 Saint-Vincent, Italy ===
Italy won again. This was the last for "Professor" Eugenio Chiaradia and the only one of the ten in a row that Walter Avarelli missed.

Year	Entries	Rank	
1963	4	1.	(Italy) Italy; Giorgio Belladonna, Eugenio Chiaradia, Massimo D'Alelio, Pietro Forquet, Benito Garozzo, Camillo Pabis Ticci
		2.	(United States) North America; James Jacoby (USA), Robert Jordan (USA), Peter Leventritt (USA), G. Robert Nail (USA), Arthur Robinson (USA), Howard Schenken (USA)
		3.	(France) France; René Bacherich, Gérard Desrousseaux, Pierre Ghestem, Jacques Stetten, Georges Théron, Léon Tintner

Argentina finished fourth.

=== 1965 Buenos Aires, Argentina ===
Playing at home, Argentina represented South America for the sixth time and finally defeated one of the Europeans or Americans, namely Great Britain.

This was the fifth consecutive world championship for the Blue Team, as it had won the second Olympiad in 1964. Italy would continue to win annually with the identical lineup through 1969, plus a successful comeback in 1972.

Year	Entries	Rank	
1965	4	1.	(Italy) Italy; Walter Avarelli, Giorgio Belladonna, Massimo D'Alelio, Pietro Forquet, Benito Garozzo, Camillo Pabis Ticci
		2.	(United States) North America; B. Jay Becker (USA), Ivan Erdos (USA), Dorothy Hayden (USA), Peter Leventritt (USA), Kelsey Petterson (USA), Howard Schenken (USA)
		3.	(Argentina) Argentina; Luis Attaguile, Alberto Berisso, Carlos Cabanne, Marcelo Lerner, Egisto Rocchi, Agustín Santamarina

(United Kingdom) Great Britain finished fourth. The event was marred by a cheating scandal involving the British pair Terence Reese and Boris Schapiro, known as the "Buenos Aires affair".

=== 1966 Saint-Vincent, Italy ===
The tournament expanded to five with Asia, represented by Thailand. Venezuela took Argentina's usual place and won another third for South America. Canadians Sami Kehela and Eric Murray joined four US Americans for North America.

Year	Entries	Rank	
1966	5	1.	(Italy) Italy; Walter Avarelli, Giorgio Belladonna, Massimo D'Alelio, Pietro Forquet, Benito Garozzo, Camillo Pabis Ticci
		2.	(United States) (Canada) North America; Phillip Feldesman (USA), Bob Hamman (USA), Sami Kehela (CAN), Lew Mathe (USA), Eric Murray (CAN), Ira Rubin (USA)
		3.	(Venezuela) Venezuela; Roberto Benaim, David Berah, Mario Onorati, Roger Rossignol, Renato Straziota, Francis Vernon

Netherlands finished fourth and Thailand fifth.

=== 1967 Miami Beach, USA ===
Thailand and Venezuela returned to the field. More than forty years later, 1966/1967 remain their best national performances.

Year	Entries	Rank	
1967	5	1.	(Italy) Italy; Walter Avarelli, Giorgio Belladonna, Massimo D'Alelio, Pietro Forquet, Benito Garozzo, Camillo Pabis Ticci
		2.	(United States) (Canada) North America; Edgar Kaplan (USA), Norman Kay (USA), Sami Kehela (CAN), Eric Murray (CAN), Bill Root (USA), Alvin Roth (USA)
		3.	(France) France; Jean-Michel Boulenger, Jacques Parienté, Jean-Marc Roudinesco, Jacques Stetten, Henri Szwarc, Léon Tintner

Thailand finished fourth and Venezuela fifth.

=== 1969 Rio de Janeiro, Brazil ===
Taiwan appeared on the world bridge scene with a shocking second-place performance, represented by six players using the Precision Club bidding system recently invented by C. C. Wei.

The Blue Team of Italy retired after winning its tenth consecutive Bermuda Bowl (from 1957) and ninth consecutive annual world championship in open teams (from 1961).

The United States team included two members of the professional Dallas Aces, Eisenberg–Goldman and two young players who would be Aces, Hamman and Kantar.

Year	Entries	Rank	
1969	5	1.	(Italy) Italy; Walter Avarelli, Giorgio Belladonna, Massimo D'Alelio, Pietro Forquet, Benito Garozzo, Camillo Pabis Ticci
		2.	(Taiwan) Taiwan; Frank Huang, Patrick Huang, C. S. Shen, K. W. Shen (THA), Kovit Suchartkul (THA), Min-Fang Tai
		3.	(United States) North America; Billy Eisenberg (USA), Bobby Goldman (USA), Bob Hamman (USA), Edwin Kantar (USA), Sidney Lazard (USA), George Rapée (USA)

France finished fourth and Brazil fifth.

== 1970s ==
=== 1970 Stockholm, Sweden ===
The Aces won the 17th Bermuda Bowl, the first for a United States or North America team since they won the first four. Taiwan finished second again, with only five players and only two veterans from 1969. Norway and Brazil also finished ahead of Italy, the defending champion bridge nation represented by a wholly new team.

Year	Entries	Rank	
1970	5	1.	(United States) North America; Billy Eisenberg (USA), Bobby Goldman (USA), Bob Hamman (USA), James Jacoby (USA), Mike Lawrence (USA), Bobby Wolff (USA)
		2.	(Taiwan) Taiwan; Conrad Cheng, Elmer Hsiao, Patrick Huang, Harry Lin, Min-Fang Tai, David Yp Mao
		3.	(Norway) Norway; Erik Høie, Tore Jensen, Knut Koppang, Bjørn Larsen, Louis André Strøm, Willy Varnås

Brazil finished fourth and the new Italy fifth.

=== 1971 Taipei, Taiwan ===
The Aces won as defending champions while the field expanded to include Australia.

Year	Entries	Rank	
1971	6	1.	(United States) Aces; Billy Eisenberg (USA), Bobby Goldman (USA), Bob Hamman (USA), James Jacoby (USA), Mike Lawrence (USA), Bobby Wolff (USA)
		2.	(France) France; Jean-Michel Boulenger, Pierre Jaïs, Jean-Marc Roudinesco, Jean-Louis Stoppa, Henri Szwarc, Roger Trézel
		3.	(Australia) Australia; Jim Borin, Norma Borin, Richard Cummings, Denis Howard, Tim Seres, Roelof Smilde

Taiwan finished fourth at home, one year after finishing second.

=== 1973 Guarujá, Brazil ===
The Blue Team had successfully completed a comeback by winning the 1972 Olympiad with its 1964–69 lineup. Three then retired permanently but its three greatest players continued to play for Italy (Belladonna, Forquet, and Garozzo), and to win.

The second-place Aces were defending champions with one personnel change.

Year	Entries	Rank	
1973	5	1.	(Italy) Italy; Giorgio Belladonna, Benito Bianchi, Pietro Forquet, Giuseppe Garabello, Benito Garozzo, Vito Pittalà
		2.	(United States) Aces; Mark Blumenthal (USA), Bobby Goldman (USA), Bob Hamman (USA), James Jacoby (USA), Mike Lawrence (USA), Bobby Wolff (USA)
		3.	(Brazil) Brazil; Pedro Paulo Assumpção, Marcelo Branco, Pedro Paulo Branco, Gabriel Chagas, Gabino Cintra, Christiano Fonseca

North America finished fourth, represented by a team of six men from the US.

=== 1974 Venice, Italy ===
Italy defended its championship at home. The World Bridge Federation inaugurated its Venice Cup for "Women Teams", which increased in size and frequency to match the biennial Bermuda Bowl tournament for "Open Teams" in 1985. No woman had played for a Bermuda Bowl winner; only two had finished second. (Note: Two women had been Bermuda Bowl runners-up, Helen Sobel playing with no fixed partner in 1957 and Dorothy Hayden playing with B. Jay Becker in 1965, whose American teams were both defeated by Italy in the final. The foursome comprising Sobel with Charles Vogelhofer and Josephine Culbertson with her husband Ely, one of two teams representing North America, had been defeated by Austria in the 1937 final.) Meanwhile, the quadrennial Olympiad ran two tournaments, open and women, side by side from its start in 1960.

Year	Entries	Rank	
1974	6	1.	(Italy) Italy; Giorgio Belladonna, Benito Bianchi, Pietro Forquet, Benito Garozzo (Dano De Falco, Arturo Franco)*
		2.	(United States) (Canada) North America; Mark Blumenthal (USA), Bobby Goldman (USA), Bob Hamman (USA), Sami Kehela (CAN), Eric Murray (CAN), Bobby Wolff (USA)
		3.	(Brazil) Brazil; Pedro Paulo Assumpção, Marcelo Branco, Pedro Paulo Branco, Gabriel Chagas, Gabino Cintra, Christiano Fonseca

* De Falco and Franco did not play enough boards to qualify for the title of World Champion.

Indonesia finished fourth.

=== 1975 Southampton, Bermuda ===
For the 25th anniversary of the inaugural tournament, the 21st returned to Bermuda, as the 34th tournament would do for the 50th anniversary. Italy won its thirteenth Bermuda Bowl, its third in a row, and its last before 2005. Pietro Forquet missed this one, leaving Giorgio Belladonna alone with 13 Bowls.

Year	Entries	Rank	
1975	5	1.	(Italy) Italy; Giorgio Belladonna, Gianfranco Facchini, Arturo Franco, Benito Garozzo, Vito Pittalà, Sergio Zucchelli
		2.	(United States) North America; Billy Eisenberg (USA), Bob Hamman (USA), Edwin Kantar (USA), Paul Soloway (USA), John Swanson (USA), Bobby Wolff (USA)
		3.	(France) France; Jean-Michel Boulenger, Michel Lebel, François Leenhardt, Christian Mari, Henri Szwarc, Edmond Vial

Indonesia finished fourth, Brazil fifth.

=== 1976 Monte Carlo, Monaco ===
The 22nd was the only Bermuda Bowl contested during a World Team Olympiad year. The two Open tournaments were played back to back during three weeks in May, with Italy beaten first by the United States and then by Brazil in the finals.

Israel finished third as the second representative of Europe.

Year	Entries	Rank	
1976	6	1.	(United States) North America; Billy Eisenberg (USA), Fred Hamilton (USA), Erik Paulsen (USA), Hugh Ross(USA), Ira Rubin (USA), Paul Soloway (USA)
		2.	(Italy) Italy; Giorgio Belladonna, Pietro Forquet, Arturo Franco, Benito Garozzo, Vito Pittalà, Antonio Vivaldi
		3.	(Israel) Israel; Julian Frydrich, Michael Hochzeit, Sam Lev, Yeshayahu Levit, Pinhas Romik, Eliakim Shaufel

Brazil finished fourth with the same lineup that placed third in 1973 and 1974. With one personnel change they won the Open Olympiad tournament that immediately following this exceptional Bermuda Bowl. It remains the only year with two world champion teams in the open category.

=== 1977 Manila, Philippines ===
Both teams "North America" and "Defending Champions" comprised six men from the US. The six defending champion players divided two and four, as the Aces with defending players Eisenberg and Soloway regrouped as "North America". (Under double representation for the United States beginning in 1991, the two USA teams must face each other if both advance to the semifinal.)

Year	Entries	Rank	
1977	6	1.	(United States) North America; Billy Eisenberg (USA), Edwin Kantar (USA), Bob Hamman (USA), Paul Soloway (USA), John Swanson (USA), Bobby Wolff (USA)
		2.	(United States) Defending Champions; Fred Hamilton (USA), Mike Passell (USA), Erik Paulsen (USA), Hugh Ross (USA), Ira Rubin (USA), Ron Von der Porten (USA)
		3.	(Sweden) Sweden; Anders Brunzell, Sven-Olov Flodqvist, Hans Göthe, Jörgen Lindqvist, Anders Morath, Per Olof Sundelin

Argentina finished fourth.

=== 1979 Rio de Janeiro, Brazil ===
The 24th Bermuda Bowl was the first to be decided by a margin that is commonly scored on a single deal, merely 5 IMPs. Malcolm Brachman's professional team of US Americans defeated Italy by that much.

The defending champion team was not invited after 1977, so the tournament again matched one team from each WBF geographic zone that chose to participate. The number of teams remained at six because "Central America & the Caribbean" sent a team for the first time, three players from Panama and three from Venezuela with a Guadeloupe captain. Brachman from North America and national teams from Italy, Australia, Taiwan, and host Brazil represented the other four zones.

Year	Entries	Rank	
1979	6	1.	(United States) North America; Malcolm Brachman (USA), Billy Eisenberg (USA), Bobby Goldman (USA), Edwin Kantar (USA), Mike Passell (USA), Paul Soloway (USA)
		2.	(Italy) Italy; Giorgio Belladonna, Dano De Falco, Arturo Franco, Benito Garozzo, Lorenzo Lauria, Vito Pittalà
		3.	(Australia) Australia; Jim Borin, Norma Borin, Richard Cummings, Andrew Reiner, Bobby Richman, Tim Seres

Taiwan finished fourth.

== 1980s ==
The Bermuda Bowl made several changes around 1980. The defending champion team was dropped in 1979. For 1981 Europe was awarded two places in the tournament, the first expansion beyond zonal champions (plus the world champion, 1961 to 1977). There would be nine teams if every WBF zone sent a champion. For 1983, European and North American champions would have two places in the 4-team semifinal round. European and North American runners up would contend with champions of the other zones and the host country for two other semifinal slots. (Europe and North America had won all the Bermuda Bowls. Outsiders had finished second in 1969–70 and 1981.) Beginning in 1985, the Bermuda Bowl for open teams and Venice Cup for women would run side by side with the same structure in a venue outside Europe and North America (maintained until 2001).

=== 1981 Port Chester, NY, USA ===
Pakistan represented "Asia and the Middle East", a novelty, and finished second, a shock. This was the third silver medal for teams from outside Europe and North America, joining Taiwan 1969–70. "Pakistani preempts" were notable and team's best player Zia Mahmood was recognized as a great one.

For the United States, led by Bud Reinhold—who played, but not enough to qualify personally as a world champion— Levin, Rodwell, and Meckstroth made their international debuts at 23 to 25 years old, Levin being the youngest winner on record.

Europe was represented by both Poland and Great Britain, first and second in the 18-team open flight of the European championships.

Year	Entries	Rank	
1981	7	1.	(United States) USA; Russ Arnold, Bobby Levin, Jeff Meckstroth, Eric Rodwell, John Solodar (Bud Reinhold)*
		2.	(Pakistan) Pakistan; Nishat Abedi, Nisar Ahmed, Munir Attaullah, Jan-e-Alam Fazli, Zia Mahmood, Masood Saleem
		3.	(Poland) Poland; Aleksander Jezioro, Julian Klukowski, Marek Kudła, Krzysztof Martens, Andrzej Milde, Tomasz Przybora

* Reinhold did not play enough boards to qualify for the title of World Champion.

Argentina finished fourth.

=== 1983 Stockholm, Sweden ===
Beginning in 1983, North America joined Europe with double representation, and the host country was automatically included too, so the potential size of the field increased by two. United States teams finished first and second in North America while France, Italy, and world host Sweden ranked 1, 2, and 7 among 24 teams in the open European championship. Under the new structure, USA1 and France earned byes to the Bermuda Bowl semifinal while USA2, Italy, and Sweden contended with the champions of other zones for two more semifinal slots. Five other zones were represented, ten teams in all.

USA2 and Italy won the preliminary stage; USA1 and Italy won semifinal matches to meet in the final, the international swan song for Giorgio Belladonna and for the legendary Belladonna–Garozzo partnership.

Year	Entries	Rank	
1983	10	1.	(United States) USA 1 (Note: Annual rankings published by the WBF show double representation for the US in 1983 and from 1991 to date. Select "Venue" links at "World Team Championships to Date". Confirmed 2011-08-17. • Sometimes before 1983, there was one "North America" team representing the American Contract Bridge League rather than any national team representing USA, Canada, Mexico, or Bermuda.); Michael Becker, Bob Hamman, Ron Rubin, Alan Sontag, Peter Weichsel, Bobby Wolff
		2.	(Italy) Italy; Giorgio Belladonna, Dano De Falco, Arturo Franco, Benito Garozzo, Lorenzo Lauria, Carlo Mosca
		3.	(France) France; Michel Corn, Philippe Cronier, Michel Lebel, Hervé Mouiel, Philippe Soulet, Henri Szwarc

(United States) USA 2 finished fourth.

The size of the field increased by three, not two, because "Asia and the Middle East" (debut 1981) and "Central America and the Caribbean" (debut 1979) were both represented, by Pakistan and a transnational squad including four men from Jamaica. Only Africa among the eight modern geographic zones was not yet represented.

=== 1985 São Paulo, Brazil ===
Beginning in 1985 the Bermuda Bowl and the Venice Cup for women have been side-by-side tournaments with the same structure. From 1985 to 2000 they were always sited outside Europe and North America.

For three cycles, 1985 to 1989, one team each from the United States and Canada represented North America. All three US teams were based on the San Francisco-area team anchored by Chip Martel–Lew Stansby and Peter Pender–Hugh Ross. They won the annual US Grand National Teams in 1982-83-85-87 (with another pair in '82, with Mike Lawrence in '87).

Austria and Israel finished 1–2 among 21 open teams in Europe and placed 2–3 behind USA in São Paulo.

Year	Entries	Rank	
1985	10	1.	(United States) USA; Bob Hamman, Chip Martel, Peter Pender, Hugh Ross, Lew Stansby, Bobby Wolff
		2.	(Austria) Austria; Heinrich Berger, Kurt Feichtinger, Jan Fucik, Wolfgang Meinl, Karl Rohan, Franz Terraneo
		3.	(Israel) Israel; David Birman, Sam Lev, Eliakim Shaufel, Shalom Zeligman, Julian Frydrich*, Michael Hochzeit*

* Frydrich and Hochzeit did not play enough boards to qualify for third place.

Brazil finished fourth.

Infrequent entries Canada, New Zealand, and India finished 8–9–10, having qualified in the familiar places of "USA 2", Australia, and Pakistan.

=== 1987 Ocho Ríos, Jamaica ===
The "San Francisco" GNT with world veterans Hamman–Wolff defended successfully. Great Britain and Sweden reversed their European finish.

Year	Entries	Rank	
1987	10	1.	(United States) USA; Bob Hamman, Mike Lawrence, Chip Martel, Hugh Ross, Lew Stansby, Bobby Wolff
		2.	(United Kingdom) Great Britain; John Armstrong, Raymond Brock, Jeremy Flint, Tony Forrester, Graham Kirby, Robert Sheehan
		3.	(Sweden) Sweden; Björn Fallenius, Sven-Olov Flodqvist, Hans Göthe, Tommy Gullberg, Magnus Lindkvist, Per Olof Sundelin

Chinese Taipei finished fourth.

=== 1989 Perth, Australia ===
Brazil won its first Bermuda Bowl, defeating a team of three "San Francisco" pairs in the final.

Year	Entries	Rank	
1989	10	1.	(Brazil) Brazil; Marcelo Branco, Pedro Paulo Branco, Carlos Camacho, Gabriel Chagas, Ricardo Janz, Roberto Mello
		2.	(United States) USA; Mike Lawrence, Chip Martel, Peter Pender, Hugh Ross, Lew Stansby, Kit Woolsey
		3.	(Poland) Poland; Cezary Balicki, Julian Klukowski, Krzysztof Martens, Krzysztof Moszczyński, Marek Szymanowski, Adam Żmudziński

Australia finished fourth at home. Egypt and Colombia represented Asia–Middle East and Central America–Caribbean. Poland and France, the best of 25 teams in Europe, finished only 3rd and 6th.

== 1990s ==
=== 1991 Yokohama, Japan ===
Iceland won the Bermuda Bowl after finishing fourth in Europe, the last to qualify from Zone 1. Europe's fourth, third, and second place teams won all three medals while European champion Great Britain finished 5th to 8th in the world.

The tournament expanded from 10 teams with a 4-team knockout conclusion to 16 teams with an 8-team KO, without any playoffs to distinguish the four quarterfinal losers. Defending champion Brazil finished fourth, Argentina 5th to 8th. The two USA teams also finished 5th to 8th.

Year	Entries	Rank	
1991	16	1.	(Iceland) Iceland; Guðmundur Páll Arnarson, Örn Arnþórsson, Jón Baldursson, Guðlaugur Jóhannsson, Þorlákur Jónsson, Aðalsteinn Jörgensen
		2.	(Poland) Poland; Cezary Balicki, Piotr Gawryś, Krzysztof Lasocki, Krzysztof Martens, Marek Szymanowski, Adam Żmudziński
		3.	(Sweden) Sweden; Sven-Åke Bjerregård, Björn Fallenius, Tommy Gullberg, Anders Morath, Mats Nilsland, Per Olof Sundelin

Brazil finished fourth with the same lineup that won in 1989. With expansion from 10 to 16 teams, a third entry was awarded to North America, and the American Contract Bridge League settled on two United States teams, who both finished 5th to 8th. (The two US teams are determined under the auspices of the United States Bridge Federation. The other team from Zone 2 is determined by a playoff of other national teams, if necessary.)

=== 1993 Santiago, Chile ===
Netherlands won its first Bermuda Bowl. Netherlands and Norway were fourth and third in Europe, as finalists Iceland and Poland had been two years earlier.

De Boer, Leufkens, and Westra had played on the Netherlands 1987 world champion junior team. Helgemo of Norway played on the contemporary junior team and thus won two silver medals in 1993.

Year	Entries	Rank	
1993	16	1.	(Netherlands) Netherlands; Wubbo de Boer, Piet Jansen, Enri Leufkens, Bauke Muller, Jan Westerhof, Berry Westra
		2.	(Norway) Norway; Terje Aa, Glenn Grøtheim, Geir Helgemo, Tor Helness, Arild Rasmussen, Jon Sveindal
		3.	(Brazil) Brazil; Marcelo Amaral, José Barbosa, Pedro Paulo Branco, Carlos Camacho, Gabriel Chagas, Roberto Mello

(United States) USA 2 finished fourth. South Africa represented Africa for the first time. Mexico won the third slot from North America. Host Chile finished last, as Japan and Jamaica had done.

=== 1995 Beijing, China ===
This was the first win for Nick Nickell's professional team ("Nickell" in North American tournaments).

Canada made its best showing by far and South Africa finished fifth while the European and US champions did not reach the quarterfinal.

Year	Entries	Rank	
1995	16	1.	(United States) USA 2 Richard Freeman, Bob Hamman, Jeff Meckstroth, Nick Nickell, Eric Rodwell, Bobby Wolff
		2.	(Canada) Canada; Boris Baran, Fred Gitelman, Eric Kokish, George Mittelman, Mark Molson, Joey Silver
		3.	(France) France; Paul Chemla, Philippe Cronier, Michel Lebel, Michel Perron, Robert Reiplinger, Philippe Soulet

Sweden finished fourth.

=== 1997 Hammamet, Tunisia ===
France won its second Bermuda Bowl as the fifth and last qualifier from Europe following another Bermuda Bowl tournament expansion.

Year	Entries	Rank	
1997	18	1.	(France) France; Paul Chemla, Alain Lévy, Christian Mari, Hervé Mouiel, Franck Multon, Michel Perron
		2.	(United States) USA 2 Richard Freeman, Bob Hamman, Jeff Meckstroth, Nick Nickell, Eric Rodwell, Bobby Wolff
		3.	(Norway) Norway; Terje Aa, Boye Brogeland, Glenn Grøtheim, Geir Helgemo, Tor Helness, Erik Sælensminde

(United States) USA 1 finished fourth.

Host Tunisia finished last and South Africa second-last.

== 2000s ==
=== 2000 Southampton, Bermuda ===
The Bermuda Bowl cycle continued as usual in 1998/1999 but the concluding tournament was in January 2000, marking the 50th anniversary of the inaugural contest in Hamilton. (Note: Alan Truscott wrote "exactly half a century" without specifying exactly to the calendar year, month, weekday, or date. Beside the expansion, "Britain" had been succeeded by England, Scotland, and Wales as three of about forty bridge nations in "Europe".) In contrast to that three-way competition among teams representing America, Britain, and Europe, there were now eight geographic zones from which twenty teams qualified in numbers influenced by past bridge population and performance.

Europe: Italy, Sweden, Norway, Bulgaria, France, Poland —ranks 1 to 6 in the European championship
North America: Canada, USA 1, USA 2
South America: Argentina, Brazil
Asia & Middle East: Pakistan
Central America & Caribbean: Guadeloupe and Bermuda as the host country
Pacific Asia: China, Taiwan, Indonesia
South Pacific: Australia, New Zealand
Africa: South Africa

Year	Entries	Rank	
2000 (1999 cycle)	20	1.	(United States) USA 1 Richard Freeman, Bob Hamman, Jeff Meckstroth, Nick Nickell, Eric Rodwell, Paul Soloway
		2.	(Brazil) Brazil; Marcelo Branco, João Paulo Campos, Gabriel Chagas, Ricardo Janz, Roberto Mello, Miguel Villasboas
		3.	(United States) USA 2 Chip Martel, Lew Stansby, Zia Mahmood, Michael Rosenberg, Neil Silverman, Jeff Wolfson

Norway finished fourth.

Europe's six teams all finished in the top ten but only Norway reached the semifinal. Bermuda finished last, the fifth time for six hosts since 1989.

=== 2001 Paris, France ===
Year	Entries	Rank	
2001	18	1.	(United States) USA 2 Kyle Larsen, Chip Martel, Rose Meltzer, Alan Sontag, Lew Stansby, Peter Weichsel
		2.	(Norway) Norway; Terje Aa, Boye Brogeland, Glenn Grøtheim, Geir Helgemo, Tor Helness, Erik Sælensminde
		3.	(Poland) Poland; Cezary Balicki, Michał Kwiecień, Marcin Leśniewski, Krzysztof Martens, Jacek Pszczoła, Adam Żmudziński

Italy finished fourth.

=== 2003 Monte Carlo, Monaco ===
Expansion to 22 teams. Perennial European champions Italy returned to the top ranks of the Bermuda Bowl competition, but lost to USA 1 in the finals.

Year	Entries	Rank	
2003	22	1.	(United States) USA 1 Richard Freeman, Bob Hamman, Jeff Meckstroth, Nick Nickell, Eric Rodwell, Paul Soloway
		2.	(Italy) Italy; Norberto Bocchi, Giorgio Duboin, Fulvio Fantoni, Lorenzo Lauria, Claudio Nunes, Alfredo Versace
		3.	(United States) USA 2 Doug Doub, Steve Landen, Pratap Rajadhyaksha, Adam Wildavsky (Dan Morse, Bobby Wolff)*

* Morse and Wolff did not play enough boards to qualify for third place.

Norway finished fourth.

=== 2005 Estoril, Portugal ===
Italy's 14th Bermuda Bowl win was its first since 1975.

Year	Entries	Rank	
2005	22	1.	(Italy) Italy; Norberto Bocchi, Giorgio Duboin, Fulvio Fantoni, Lorenzo Lauria, Claudio Nunes, Alfredo Versace
		2.	(United States) USA 1 Richard Freeman, Bob Hamman, Jeff Meckstroth, Nick Nickell, Eric Rodwell, Paul Soloway
		3.	(United States) USA 2 Fred Gitelman, Eric Greco, Geoff Hampson, Russ Ekeblad, Brad Moss, Ron Rubin

Sweden finished fourth.

Fulvio Fantoni and Claudio Nunes of the Italian teams were later found cheating, and are currently barred from play by multiple bridge associations.

=== 2007 Shanghai, China ===
The 38th Bermuda Bowl saw Norway win its first title, after two second, one third, and two fourth from 1993. Helgemo–Helness and Glenn Grøtheim were members of all six teams.

Year	Entries	Rank	
2007	22	1.	(Norway) Norway; Boye Brogeland, Glenn Grøtheim, Geir Helgemo, Tor Helness, Erik Sælensminde, Ulf Håkon Tundal
		2.	(United States) USA 1 Steve Garner, George Jacobs, Ralph Katz, Zia Mahmood, Michael Rosenberg, Howard Weinstein
		3.	(Netherlands) Netherlands; Ton Bakkeren, Huub Bertens, Sjoert Brink, Bas Drijver, Simon de Wijs, Bauke Muller

South Africa finished fourth. Its advance to the quarterfinal was a surprise and there it knocked out the defending champion and advance favourite Italy.

=== 2009 São Paulo, Brazil ===
This was the fourth win for Nick Nickell's professional teams representing the United States (1995, 2000, 2003, 2009). Meckstroth–Rodwell and Bob Hamman were also members of all four teams.

Year	Entries	Rank	
2009	22	1.	(United States) USA 2 Bob Hamman, Zia Mahmood, Jeff Meckstroth, Eric Rodwell, Nick Nickell, Ralph Katz*
		2.	Italy; Antonio Sementa, Giorgio Duboin, Fulvio Fantoni, Claudio Nunes, Lorenzo Lauria, Alfredo Versace
		3.	Bulgaria; Victor Aronov, Diyan Danailov, Kalin Karaivanov, Georgi Karakolev, Julian Stefanov, Roumen Trendafilov

* Katz was the replacement for Richard Freeman, who died after USA 2 qualified for the Bermuda Bowl.

China "Long Zhu" finished fourth. Beside China and the American winners, the quarterfinalists were all six teams from Europe. Bulgaria placed third after winning the first European Small Federations Trophy in 2007, for national teams representing no more than 500 players.

== 2010s ==
=== 2011 Veldhoven, Netherlands ===
The 40th Bermuda Bowl tournament concluded Saturday, 29 October.

Italy had routed the USA champions 167–69 in a one-day match for the bronze medal while the host Netherlands faced USA 2 in a three-day final. The Dutch hosts led by 55 IMP after two days (96 deals) and scored very well in the first session on Saturday to lead by 83 and coast to victory.

Year	Entries	Rank	
2011	22	1.	Netherlands; Sjoert Brink, Bas Drijver, Bauke Muller, Ricco van Prooijen, Louk Verhees, Simon de Wijs
		2.	(United States) USA 2 Kevin Bathurst, Joe Grue, John Hurd, Justin Lall, Joel Wooldridge, Daniel Zagorin
		3.	Italy; Norberto Bocchi, Agustín Madala, Giorgio Duboin, Antonio Sementa, Lorenzo Lauria, Alfredo Versace

(United States) USA 1 finished fourth. The losing quarterfinalists were Israel, Sweden, Iceland, and China.

Netherlands won the 2011 Bermuda Bowl by 300 to 255 IMP in three days play against USA 2, the second of two entries from the United States.

Final match, IMP scores in eight segments
		1	2	3	4	5	6	7	8	Total
USA 2	0	44	43	21	16	32	33	26	40	255
Netherlands	1	31	35	63	54	37	23	47	9	300
	Carry	day 1			day 2			day 3		

The final eight segments of 16 deals each started with an insignificant one IMP carryover advantage for Dutch home team. The one IMP represented half the margin in their short match, a 25–23 win for Netherlands in round two. With a strong third segment, Netherlands surged to a 130–108 lead after one day and then extended the difference to as much as 65 on day two ultimately finishing 55 IMPs ahead after six segments. After day three's seventh segment, the margin increased to 76 IMPs, nearly decisive with only 16 deals to play. The Americans rebounded in the last segment but the gains were "too small" as time ran out.

Preliminary

There were 22 national teams in the field, who represented the eight WBF zones as follows. The regular quota for Europe is six teams, seven at Veldhoven because the host country qualifies automatically.#

Europe: Italy, Poland, Israel, Iceland, Sweden, Netherlands, Bulgaria —ranks 1 to 7 in the European championship
North America: Canada, USA 1, USA 2
South America: Brazil, Chile
Asia & Middle East: India, Pakistan
C. America & Carib.: Guadeloupe
Pacific Asia: China, Japan, Singapore
South Pacific: Australia, New Zealand
Africa: Egypt, South Africa

The first stage was a full round-robin. Every team played 21 short matches of 16 deals, three daily, scheduled in advance. (Note: Schedule of Play / Bermuda Bowl. 2011. WBF. Given the full round-robin structure, the particular schedule should make no difference in the outcome of the first stage.) Italy, Netherlands, USA 2, and Israel earned the first four places comfortably, each almost a full match ahead of the next place. The US champions finished fifth by scoring 340.5 Victory Points, or 16.2 per match where a draw is worth 15. Sweden, China, and Iceland qualified with fewer than 16 VP per match while Japan, New Zealand, and Australia made strong showings as the first three also-rans, ahead of two Europeans, Poland and Bulgaria. (All six Europeans had qualified for knockout play two years earlier.)

Italy, Netherlands, and USA 2 selected quarterfinal opponents China, Iceland, and Sweden leaving Israel to face USA 1. Italy and China, second and fourth in 2009, played the only close match, where Italy built a 5 IMP lead to 26 during the last segment. During the same segment Sweden trailed USA 2 by at least 30, Iceland trailed by almost 100, and Israel conceded to USA 1 without play.

Two US American entries in a Zonal Teams knockout always meet in one semifinal match, if they survive so long (and they never meet earlier).# In Veldhoven a strong fifth segment was almost decisive for USA 2, who extended a lead from 12 to 62 IMP with 16 deals to play, and won by 60. Meanwhile, Italy and Netherlands were nearly even at the end of every segment, the only time players know the score precisely. After five Netherlands led by 3+ IMP including 2+ carryover, having bettered Italy 155 to 154 on 80 deals. They "won" the final segment by 26 and the match by 199+ to 170. In retrospect, two "slam swings" were decisive. On the 87th and 90th deals (#23, #29), Netherlands bid 6♠ and 6♥ while Italy bid 4♠ and 4♥. All four declarers took the twelve tricks for slam, worth twice 13 IMP for the winners.

While Netherlands and USA 2 played for the Bowl, Italy easily beat the US champions in 48 deals and earned the bronze medal, 167–69.

=== 2013 Bali, Indonesia ===
Italy won its 15th Bermuda Bowl with a 210–126 defeat of Monaco, represented by Pierre Zimmermann's immigrant professional team. Poland won the bronze medal by a fraction less than 5 IMPs.

Year	Entries	Rank	
2013	22	1.	Italy; Norberto Bocchi, Agustín Madala, Giorgio Duboin, Antonio Sementa, Lorenzo Lauria, Alfredo Versace
		2.	Monaco; Fulvio Fantoni, Claudio Nunes, Geir Helgemo, Tor Helness, Franck Multon, Pierre Zimmermann
		3.	Poland; Cezary Balicki, Krzysztof Buras, Krzysztof Jassem, Marcin Mazurkiewicz, Grzegorz Narkiewicz, Adam Żmudziński

(United States) USA1 finished fourth.

=== 2015 Chennai, India ===
The two-week tournament in Chennai, India (formerly Madras), began on Sunday, 27 September, with one week of round-robin play through Saturday, 3 October. During the preceding month, revelations of cheating by two of the leading pairs, at events including the 2014 European Team Championships, had led to withdrawal from the Bermuda Bowl by the Israel and Monaco teams that had placed first and second in that event. Germany had dropped from the 22-team field after one of its three pairs confessed "preemptively". On the last day before the first matches in Chennai, the World Bridge Federation had announced its withdrawal of credentials for one of three pairs on the Poland team, making that pair ineligible to play, however Poland were not forced to withdraw. (Two pairs from each team participate in each segment.)

The Bermuda Bowl was won by Poland, who defeated Sweden in the final by 308.5 IMPs to 293. The bronze medal went to USA2, who defeated England in the third-place match 252.3 to 243.

Year	Entries	Rank	
2015	22	1.	Poland; Piotr Gawrys, Krzysztof Jassem, Jacek Kalita, Michal Klukowski, Marcin Mazurkiewicz, Michal Nowosadzki, Piotr Walczak npc
		2.	Sweden; Tommy Bergdahl, Fredrik Nyström, Johan Sylvan, Johan Upmark, Niklas Warne, Frederic Wrang, Jan Lagerman npc
		3.	United States 2 Vincent Demuy, Paul Fireman, John Hurd, John Kranyak, Gavin Wolpert, Joel Wooldridge, Shane Blanchard npc

England finished fourth.

=== 2017 Lyon, France ===
Year	Entries	Rank	
2017	22	1.	United States 2 Martin Fleisher, Joe Grue, Chip Martel, Brad Moss, Jacek Pszczoła, Michael Rosenberg, Jan Martel npc
		2.	France; Thomas Bessis, Francois Combescure, Cédric Lorenzini, Jean-Christophe Quantin, Jerome Rombaut, Frederic Volcker, Lionel Sebbane npc
		3.	Bulgaria; Viktor Aronov, Diana Damianova, Georgi Karakolev, Vladimir Mihov, Ivan Nanev, Julian Stefanov, Viktor Aronov pc, Marta Nikolova coach

New Zealand finished fourth.

=== 2019 Wuhan, China ===
Year	Entries	Rank	
2019	24	1.	Poland; Krzysztof Buras, Bartosz Chmurski, Jacek Kalita, Grzegorz Narkiewicz, Michal Nowosadzki, Piotr Tuczynski, Marek Pietrasek (npc), Marek Wojcicki (coach)
		2.	Netherlands; Simon De Wijs, Bob Drijver, Bauke Muller, Bart Nab, Ricco van Prooijen, Louk Verhees Jr., Anton Maas (npc), Ton Bakkeren (coach)
		3.	Norway; Terje Aa, Boye Brogeland, Nils Kare Kvangraven, Espen Lindqvist, Allan Livgard, Ulf Haakon Tundal, Christian Venneroed (npc), Sten Bjertnes (coach)

(United States) USA 1 finished fourth.

== 2020s ==
=== 2022 Salsomaggiore, Italy ===
Tournament scheduled for 2021 but held in 2022 due to the COVID-19 pandemic

Year	Entries	Rank	
2022	24	1.	Switzerland; Sjoert Brink, Bas Drijver, Piotr Gawryś, Michał Klukowski, Fernando Piedra, Pierre Zimmermann, Krzysztof Martens (coach)
		2.	Netherlands; Simon de Wijs, Bauke Muller, Berend van den Bos, Joris van Lankveld, Ricco van Prooijen, Louk Verhees Jr, Gert-Jan Ros (npc), Ton Bakkeren (coach)
		3.	Norway; Terje Aa, Christian Bakke, Boye Brogeland, Geir Helgemo, Tor Helness, Allan Livgård, Tolle Stabell (npc), Sten Bjertnes (coach)
		3.	United States 1 Eric Greco, Geoff Hampson, Ralph Katz, Bobby Levin, Nick Nickell, Steve Weinstein, Jill Levin (npc), Eric Kokish (coach)

=== 2023 Marrakesh, Morocco ===
Year	Entries	Rank	
2023	24	1.	Switzerland; Sjoert Brink, Bas Drijver, Jacek Kalita, Michał Klukowski, Michal Nowosadzki, Pierre Zimmermann, Fernando Piedra (npc), Luis Lantaron (coach)
		2.	Norway; Terje Aa, Christian Bakke, Boye Brogeland, Tor Eivind Grude, Geir Helgemo, Allan Livgård, Tolle Stabell (npc), Sten Bjertnes (coach)
		3.	Italy; Massimiliano di Franco, Giovanni Donati, Andrea Manno, Giacomo Percario, Antonio Sementa, Alfredo Versace, Alessandro Piana (npc)

(United States) USA 2 finished fourth.

=== 2025 Herning, Denmark ===
Year	Entries	Rank	
2025	24	1.	(United States) USA 1 Kevin Bathurst, Adam Grossack, John Hurd, Adam Kaplan, Finn Kolesnik, Eddie Wold, Bob Morris (npc)
		2.	(Denmark) DEN; Michael Askgaard, Dennis Bilde, Kasper Konow, Christian Lahrmann, Andreas Plejdrup-Meister, Martin Schaltz, Morten Bilde (npc), Palle Reinmann (coach)
		3.	(Sweden) SWE; Per-Ola Cullin, Marion Michielsen, Fredrik Nyström, Mikael Rimstedt, Ola Rimstedt, Johan Upmark, Fredrik Kronmarker (npc)

== Medals (1950-2025) ==
Rank	Nation	Gold	Silver	Bronze	Total
1	United States (USA)	20	21	6	47
2	Italy (ITA)	15	6	2	23
3	France (FRA)	2	3	6	11
4	Netherlands (NED)	2	2	1	5
5	Poland (POL)	2	1	6	9
6	Switzerland (SWI)	2	0	0	2
7	Norway (NOR)	1	3	4	8
8	Great Britain (GBR)	1	2	1	4
9	Brazil (BRA)	1	1	3	5
10	Iceland (ISL)	1	0	0	1
11	Canada (CAN)	0	5	0	5
12	Sweden (SWE)	0	2	3	5
13	Chinese Taipei (TPE)	0	2	0	2
14	Austria (AUT)	0	1	0	1
14	Denmark (DEN)	0	1	0	1
14	Monaco (MON)	0	1	0	1
14	Pakistan (PAK)	0	1	0	1
18	Argentina (ARG)	0	0	4	4
19	Australia (AUS)	0	0	2	2
19	Bulgaria (BUL)	0	0	2	2
19	Israel (ISR)	0	0	2	2
22	Venezuela (VEN)	0	0	1	1
Totals (22 entries)		47	52	43	142

== Zones and nations ==
See the version at "Senior Bowl".

== See also ==
- World Team Olympiad
- 2021 World Bridge Team Championships
