= Bobby Goldman =

American bridge player, teacher, writer, and official

Robert "Bobby", "Bob" Goldman (November 10, 1938 – May 16, 1999) was an American bridge player, teacher and writer. He won three Bermuda Bowls (1970, 1971, 1979), Olympiad Mixed Teams 1972, and 20 North American Bridge Championships. He authored books on bridge, most notably Aces Scientific and Winners and Losers at the Bridge Table, and conventions including Kickback, Exclusion Blackwood and Super Gerber (Redwood). He was from Highland Village, Texas.

Goldman first played duplicate bridge in 1957 while studying at Drexel University in Philadelphia. He began teaching six months later and taught "a modest number of classes" until he joined the Dallas Aces team in 1968. His early partners with the Aces were Michael Lawrence and Billy Eisenberg; the team won Bermuda Bowls in 1970 and 1971. About that time he began "teaching heavily—15 department classes a week" and some private lessons. His favorite partner was Paul Soloway, with whom he played more than two decades. Goldman was an American Contract Bridge League (ACBL) Grand Life Master with more than 25,000 masterpoints and a World Bridge Federation (WBF) World Grand Master. He was active in ACBL administration, participating in its Competition and Conventions Committee, Committee for an Open and Improved ACBL, and Women's Forum. On the former committee he contributed to shaping the ACBL alert procedure, convention card, ethics and appeals process, and smoking ban.

Goldman died of a heart attack in Dallas, Texas, at the age of 60.

== Works ==
Books

- Aces Scientific (Inglewood, CA: Max Hardy, 1978)
- Winners and Losers at the Bridge Table, illustrated by Mary Grace (Hardy, 1979)

Pamphlets

- Doubles (Louisville, KY: Devyn Press, 1981), Championship Bridge no. 23
- Slam Bidding is Fun (Goldman, 198?) – "The 500 hands were randomly dealt by computer."; created and programmed by Bobby Goldman OCLC 20032999

== Bridge accomplishments ==
=== Honors ===
- ACBL Hall of Fame, 1999
- ACBL Honorary Member of the Year 1999

=== Wins ===
- Bermuda Bowl (3) 1970, 1971, 1979
- Olympiad Mixed Teams (1) 1972
- North American Bridge Championships (20)
  - Vanderbilt (5) 1971, 1973, 1978, 1997, 1998
  - Spingold (5) 1969, 1978, 1983, 1986, 1988
  - Reisinger (3) 1970, 1976, 1980
  - Open Board-a-Match Teams (1) 1993
  - Men's Board-a-Match Teams (1) 1968
  - North American Swiss Teams (1) 1998
  - Jacoby Open Swiss Teams (1) 1991
  - North American Men's Swiss Teams (1) 1989
  - Life Master Pairs (1) 1968
  - Life Master Men's Pairs (1) 1964
- United States Bridge Championships (6)
  - Open Team Trials (6) 1969, 1971, 1973, 1979 (Jan), 1984, 1995
- Other notable wins:
  - Cavendish Invitational Teams (1) 1994
  - Pan American Invitational Open Teams (1) 1977
  - Pan American Invitational Open Pairs (1) 1977

=== Runners-up ===
- Bermuda Bowl (2) 1973, 1974
- World Open Team Olympiad (1) 1972
- North American Bridge Championships (17)
  - Vanderbilt (3) 1966, 1970, 1976
  - Spingold (4) 1970, 1990, 1994, 1996
  - Reisinger (5) 1968, 1986, 1990, 1993, 1994
  - Grand National Teams (1) 1998
  - Open Board-a-Match Teams (1) 1995
  - Men's Board-a-Match Teams (2) 1969, 1984
  - Blue Ribbon Pairs (1) 1968
- United States Bridge Championships (2)
  - Open Team Trials (1) 1973
  - Open Pair Trials (1) 1968
- Other notable 2nd places:
  - Forbo-Krommenie International Teams (2) 1993, 1998
  - Sunday Times Invitational Pairs (1) 1990
