= Charles Kalme =

Latvian-American chess player

Charles Ivars Kalme (Latvian: Kārlis Ivars Kalme, November 15, 1939 – March 20, 2002) was a Latvian American chess master and a mathematician.

Kalme was born in Riga, Latvia, on November 15, 1939. At the conclusion of World War II, Kalme and what was left of his family fled Latvia, lived for years in a refugee camp in Germany and finally arrived in Philadelphia in the United States in 1951.

Kalme won the U.S. Junior Chess Championship, held in Lincoln, Nebraska, in 1955 with a 9–1 score. He won the Pan-American Intercollegiate championship in 1957. In 1960, he played on the U.S. Team in the World Student Team Championship in Leningrad, USSR. The U.S. team won the World Championship, the only time the U.S. has ever won that event. Kalme won two gold medals, one for the team and the other for his individual result on board two. Kalme also represented the United States twice more in team play at this level: Helsinki 1961 and Kraków 1964. He played twice in the United States Chess Championship: 1958–1959 and 1960–1961. Kalme played the future World Chess Champion Robert Fischer (1972) three times. In 1957, he won and in both the aforementioned U.S. Championships he lost and drew respectively.

Kalme also became a master of contract bridge. He sometimes played as a partner of Michael Lawrence, who was a member of a world champion bridge team, the Dallas Aces.

Kalme received a Ph.D. degree in mathematics from New York University in 1967, and became a professor of mathematics at the University of California, Berkeley.

When the Republic of Latvia regained its freedom from the Soviet Union, Kalme returned to his native Latvia, where he died in 2002.
