= Forquet =

Forquet is a surname. Notable people with the surname include:

- Philippe Forquet, Viscount de Dorne, (1940–2020), French actor and aristocrat
- Pietro Forquet (1925–2023), Italian bridge player
