= Camillo Pabis Ticci =

Italian bridge player

Camillo Pabis Ticci (1920–2003) was an Italian bridge player. He joined the national Blue Team in 1963 and played in the Bermuda Bowl tournament with Giorgio Belladonna, whose long-time partner Walter Avarelli was unavailable. From 1964 he played with Massimo D'Alelio, winning 8 world championship titles.

Born in Florence, Pabis-Ticci was an engineer by profession. For many years he wrote "a bridge column in the magazine l'Europeo which was the most successful of its kind in Italy". Beside the Arno bidding system that he and D'Alelio used, he developed the standard system of Tuscany, in effect.

== Books ==
- I princìpi del bridge (Milano: Biblioteca universale Rizzoli, 1975-1977), 2 volumes OCLC 3869562
- Smazzate in evidenza e ricordi in vetrina: in appendice I problemi di re Nabob, Guido Barbone and Pabis Ticci (Milano: Mursia, 1976), 399 pp. OCLC 5413980
- Il bridge è un gioco d'azzardo? (Roma: Marraro, 1979), 254 pp. OCLC 66007829

== Bridge accomplishments ==
World championships

Pabis Ticci won eight world championships, all as one of six players on the Italy open team-of-four.

- Bermuda Bowl (5) 1963, 1965, 1966, 1967, 1969
- World Open Team Olympiad (3) 1964, 1968, 1972

Runners-up: none. Italy did not finish second between 1951 and 1976.

European championships

Pabis Ticci did not win the European Teams Championship, as the Blue Team did four times from 1956 to 1959. Italy qualified for every Bermuda Bowl from 1961 to 1970 as defending champion and Blue Team members did not generally play for Italy at the European level.

Runners-up

- European Open Teams (2) 1962, 1963
