= Dallas Aces =

Professional bridge (card game) team

The Dallas Aces (initially the U.S. Aces, later simply the Aces) were the world's first professional bridge team, organized in 1968 by Dallas businessman Ira Corn. Corn was determined to return bridge supremacy to America after the domination of the formidable Italian Blue Team for more than a decade. The Aces, in various formations during the years featured stars such as James Jacoby, Bobby Wolff, Billy Eisenberg, Bobby Goldman, Mike Lawrence, Paul Soloway, Eric Murray and Sami Kehela. They won the 1970, 1977 and 1983 Bermuda Bowls, as well as several other competitions. The team slowly disbanded after Corn's death in 1982.

== History ==
Corn recruited James Jacoby and Bobby Wolff, then Billy Eisenberg, Bobby Goldman, and Mike Lawrence, paying salaries ($800 per month for single players, $950 for married ones - in 2022 values: $6,400 and $7,600) plus expenses for major tournaments. Bob Hamman at first declined an invitation, but became the sixth team member in 1969. Jacoby paired with Wolff, Eisenberg with Goldman, and Lawrence with Hamman. The team practiced and analyzed hands for long hours. Corn hired coaches and provided a computer from one of his companies to assist analysis and to generate bridge deals to order.

In 1969, the team achieved its first major success, winning the Spingold Knockout Teams at the fall North American Bridge Championships. That year it represented North America in the Bermuda Bowl tournament, the nearly annual Teams world championship. But the Aces placed third behind a team from Taiwan—an astonishing upset and the first time that a Bermuda Bowl final match did not include North America or the United States. Meanwhile, the Blue Team won its tenth in a row, and then disbanded. The Aces beat Taiwan in the 1970 final and defended their title in 1971, beating France in the final.

After 1971, Corn paid only expenses, no salaries. The composition of the team began changing. In 1971, Eisenberg departed, replaced by Paul Soloway until 1973, when he in turn was replaced by Mark Blumenthal. That year the Aces as defenders lost the Bermuda Bowl final to Italy, with three players from the later Blue Teams on its roster. Lawrence and Jacoby were the next to leave, making way for the Canadian pair of Eric Murray and Sami Kehela. They lost two more Bermuda Bowl finals, in 1974 and 1975, to Italy, which fielded three and two Blue Team members, respectively. Other personnel changes followed. The Aces recaptured the Bermuda Bowl in 1977 with the pairs Eisenberg–Eddie Kantar, Hamman–Wolff, and Soloway–John Swanson (same as 1975). As "USA" in the 1980 World Team Olympiad, the Aces played well and won the silver medal. (Note: World Team Olympiad entries have represented countries, or national bridge federations, from the first rendition of the quadrennial tournaments in 1960. From 1991 the expanded, biennial Bermuda Bowl fields have included two teams representing the United States and another ACBL country, usually Canada, but some earlier Bermuda Bowl teams from North America are known today as "North America".) Corn, who would die of a heart attack in April 1982, assembled one final Aces team in 1981. Now comprising Mike Becker–Ron Rubin (Note: Becker–Rubin were partners in a New York City options firm and in a strong one-club, relay bidding system called "the Ultimate Club".) and Alan Sontag–Peter Weichsel (Note: Sontag–Weichsel played a version of the Precision strong one-club bidding system and had played on another early all-professional bridge team, the Precision Team (1970 to 1973) organized by C. C. Wei and based in New York City.) with Hamman–Wolff, it went on to win the 1982 Spingold and the 1983 Bermuda Bowl. It dedicated the victory to Corn and then disbanded.
