= Krzysztof Martens =

Krzysztof Martens is a Polish bridge player and author of multiple bridge books.

== Bridge accomplishments ==
=== Awards ===
- Mott-Smith Trophy (1) 2008
- EBL Hall of Fame (1) 2018

=== Wins ===
- World Transnational Open Teams Championship (2) 1997, 2015
- World Olympiad Teams Championship (1) 1984
- European Open Team Championships (3) 1981, 1989, 1993
- European Champions' Cup (1) 2016
- European Winter Games (1) 2016
- North American Bridge Championships (1)
  - Vanderbilt (1) 2008

=== Runners-up ===
- Bermuda Bowl (1) 1991
- Cavendish Invitational Pairs (1) 2013
- European Open Pairs (1) 2009
- North American Bridge Championships (4)
  - Jacoby Open Swiss Teams (1) 1999
  - Keohane North American Swiss Teams (1) 2010
  - Spingold Knockout Teams (2) 2016, 2019
