= Marcelo Branco =

Brazilian bridge player

Marcelo Castello Branco (born 1945) is a Brazilian bridge player from Rio de Janeiro. Among other successes, he was the winner of World Team Olympiad in Monte Carlo 1976, Bermuda Bowl in Perth 1989, and World Open pairs Championship in New Orleans 1978 and Geneva 1990. He is one of 10 players to achieve the Triple Crown of Bridge and the only player to have won the World Pairs twice – in Geneva with his most frequent partner Gabriel Chagas and in New Orleans with Gabino Cintra.
