= Chiaradia =

Chiaradia is an Italian surname. Notable people with the surname include:

- Eugenio Chiaradia (1911–1977), Italian bridge player
- Alfredo Chiaradía (born 1945), Argentine academic and policy maker
