= Massimo D'Alelio =

Italian bridge player

Massimo "Mimmo" D'Alelio (1916–1998) was an Italian bridge player. He won 13 world championships with the Italian national Blue Team, playing in partnership with Camillo Pabis Ticci during the second half of his career.

D'Alelio was born in Naples. He was a journalist who played bridge as an avocation. He was a student and partner of the Blue Team founder and theorist Eugenio Chiaradia. The team retired together after its 1969 Bermuda Bowl world championship and returned together for a successful defense of the quadrennial World Team Olympiad championship in 1972. D'Alelio then retired permanently for health reasons. As a member of the team he had played four systems with four partners.

== Bridge accomplishments ==
World championships

D'Alelio won 13 world championships, all as one of six players on the Italy open team-of-four.

- Bermuda Bowl (10) 1957, 1958, 1959, 1961, 1962, 1963, 1965, 1966, 1967, 1969
- World Open Team Olympiad (3) 1964, 1968, 1972

Runners-up: none. Italy did not finish second between 1951 and 1976.

European championships

- European Open Teams (3) 1956, 1957, 1958

Runners-up

- European Open Teams (3) 1955, 1962, 1963
