= Terje Aa =

Norwegian bridge player (born 1961)

- Born: 16 March 1961 (age 65); Trondheim, Norway

Terje Aa (born 16 March 1961) is a Norwegian bridge player, WBF World Life Master, and regular member of the Norwegian team since 1993. Teams on which he was a member have placed in the top three of the World Bridge Federation European and World Championships 11 times between 1984 and 2008.

In 1993, Aa debuted as the member of Norwegian national selection and won the Schiphol Invitational Teams in Netherlands and bronze medal in European Teams Championship in Menton, France. In the same year, they reached the final of Bermuda Bowl in Santiago de Chile, where they lost to the young Dutch team.

Aa works for the Norwegian Post Office. His regular partner between 1993 and 2006 was Glenn Grøtheim playing the "Viking Precision", a relay-based system.

== Suspension ==
Aa was a member of Geir Helgemo's team which reported a false score in a match in Norway. The match against another team was not played and was claimed to the benefit of both teams. The players involved were suspended by the Norwegian Bridge Federation for one year. Three of the players involved, Terje Aa, Geir Helgemo and Jørgen Molberg were members of the American Contract Bridge League (ACBL), and were suspended by the ACBL for one year.
