= Mark Gordon (bridge) =

American bridge player

Mark Gordon (1953–2018) was an American bridge player. He won a World Championship in 2013 in Bali.

== Bridge accomplishments ==
=== Wins ===
- World Championships (1)
  - Transnational Teams 2013
- North American Bridge Championships (2)
  - Keohane North American Swiss Teams (1) 2002
  - Roth Open Swiss Teams (1) 2011
