= Tor Helness =

Norwegian professional bridge player (born 1957)

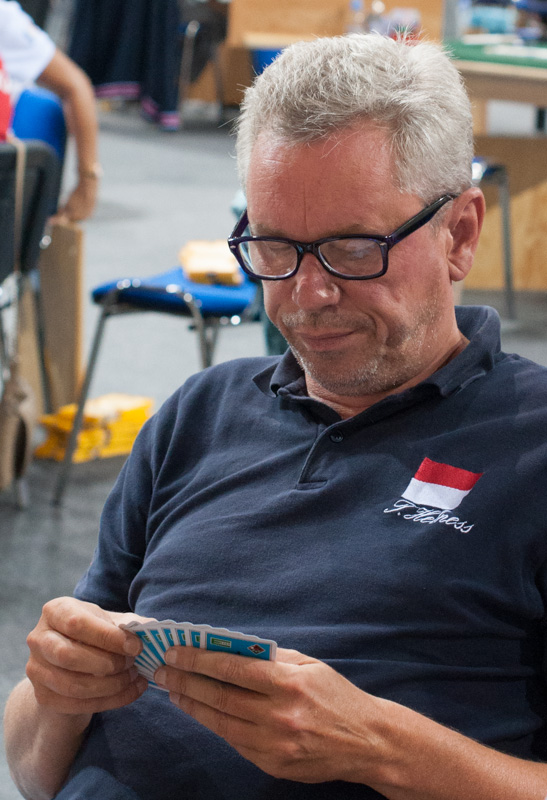
Tor Helness (2014)

Tor Helness (born 25 July 1957) is a Norwegian professional bridge player. He was a stalwart on Norway junior and open teams for thirty years before moving to Monaco. Through 2012 he has won four world championships in teams-of-four competition. As of October 2016 he ranks second among Open World Grand Masters and his regular partner Geir Helgemo ranks first.

From 1979 to 1981, Helness represented Norway on both its junior and open teams. In 1980 the juniors were European champions (there was yet no world championship) and the open team reached the World Team Olympiad semifinal. For 25 years the open team regularly reached European semifinals, and it won world silver medals in 1993 and 2001. Norway finally won the world team championship in 2007, the biennial Bermuda Bowl, with a team of six including Helness–Helgemo as anchor pair.

The couple Tor and Gunn Helness won the Mixed Pairs (an event without a world championship) at the 2005 European Open Championships. At the inaugural, 2008 World Mind Sports Games in Beijing, Tor Helness won the Open Individual gold medal and Geir Helgemo won the silver. Norway's open team won the bronze.

== Emigration to Monaco ==
From 2011 Helness and his regular Norwegian partner Geir Helgemo were full-time members of a team led and paid by the Swiss real estate tycoon Pierre Zimmermann, under contract expiring 2016. From 2012 all six members were established as residents of Monaco in order to represent the state internationally. After some success, the team dissolved as a result of the Fantoni and Nunes cheating scandal, withdrawing from the 2015 Bermuda Bowl.

Helness and Helgemo were jailed following conviction on charges of tax evasion in 2017. In 2021, they returned to the Norwegian Open team.

== Bridge career ==
=== Major wins ===
- World Championships (5)
  - Bermuda Bowl (1) 2007
  - Rosenblum Cup (2) 2006, 2018
  - World Transnational Open Teams Championship (2) 2009, 2015
- North American Bridge Championships (8)
  - Reisinger (2) 2012, 2013
  - Vanderbilt (1) 2010
  - Spingold (3) 2011, 2012, 2018
  - Jacoby Open Swiss Teams (1) 2005
  - Open Pairs I (1) 2009
- European Championships (5)
  - Open Teams (1) 2012
  - Junior Teams (1) 1980
  - Mixed Teams (1) 2005
  - Mixed Pairs (1) 2005
  - European Champions' Cup (1) 2016
- Nordic Championships (2)
  - Open Teams (2) 1980, 1982
- Norwegian Championships (34)
  - Open Pairs (7) 1980, 1982, 1986, 2002, 2003, 2006, 2007
  - Club Teams (9) 1981, 1984, 1986, 1988, 1989, 2000, 2002, 2004, 2006
  - Premier League (13) 1980, 1981, 1982, 1985, 1988, 1995, 1998, 2000, 2002, 2003, 2004, 2005, 2014
  - Swiss Teams (2) 2007, 2008
  - Mixed Pairs (1) 1991
  - Mixed Teams (2) 2004, 2012

=== Other notable wins ===
- Cap Volmac World Top Invitational Pairs (2) 1994, 1996
- Macallan Invitational Pairs (2) 1998, 1999
- Generali World Masters Individual (1) 2008
- Cavendish Invitational Teams (1) 2010
- European Winter Games (1) 2016
