= Ricco van Prooijen =

Dutch bridge player

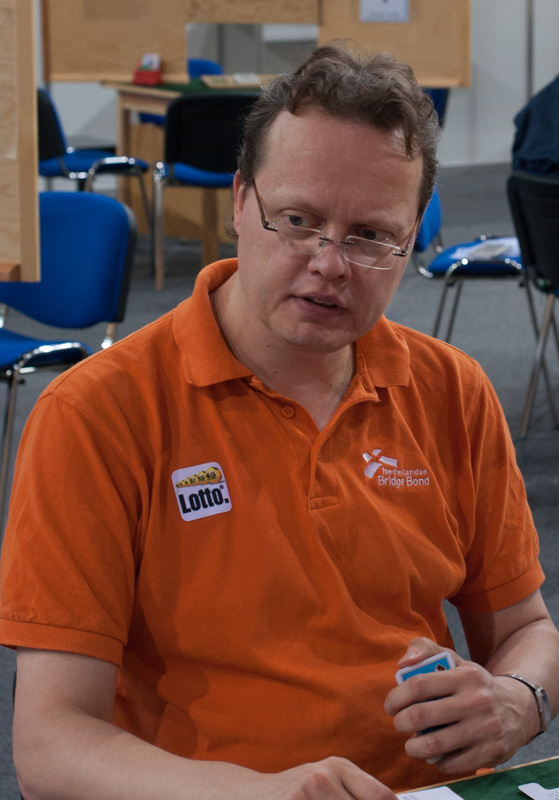
Ricco van Prooijen (2014)

Ricco van Prooijen (born 1973) is a Dutch professional bridge player.

== Bridge accomplishments ==
=== Wins ===
- Bermuda Bowl (1) 2011
- North American Bridge Championships (2)
  - Spingold (1) 2009
  - von Zedtwitz Life Master Pairs (1) 2008

=== Runners-up ===
- World Olympiad Teams Championship (1) 2004
- North American Bridge Championships (1)
  - Vanderbilt (1) 2013
