= Pierre Ghestem =

French bridge and checkers player

Ghestem during a match against Reinier Cornelis Keller at the 1947 world championship in Amsterdam

Pierre Ghestem (14 February 1922, Lille – 9 March 2000, Lille) was a French bridge and checkers player.

== Career ==
In 1947 he became the world champion in checkers. In bridge, he was a World Bridge Federation Grand Master. As a member of the France open team, he won the inaugural World Team Olympiad in 1960 and the Bermuda Bowl in 1956 (runner-up in 1954, third-place 1961 and 1963), as well as European titles in 1953, 1955, 1962 (second in 1956 and 1961).

In his early years Ghestem also played chess, and made it to the fourth position in the 1944 Chess Championship of North France.

In bridge, Pierre Ghestem is well known for his contributions to the theory of bidding. He was the author of Ghestem two-suit bids, and has significantly contributed to the theory of relay systems. He invented and played the relay-based Monaco system with his regular partner René Bacherich.

Ghestem and Bacherich were unusually slow players. Covering the 1963 Bermuda Bowl in Playboy, Alfred Sheinwold called them "the slowest partnership in the world" with "no rivals as a pair". The British expatriate Alan Truscott told readers of his New York Times bridge column in 1967, "all the records in this area are held by the famous French partnership".
