= Don Oakie =

American bridge player

Donald A. Oakie was an American bridge player.

== Bridge accomplishments ==
=== Wins ===
- Bermuda Bowl (1) 1954
- North American Bridge Championships (4)
  - Barclay Trophy (1) 1952
  - Mitchell Board-a-Match Teams (1) 1957
  - Reisinger (1) 1959
  - Spingold (1) 1953
