= Michal Nowosadzki =

Polish bridge player

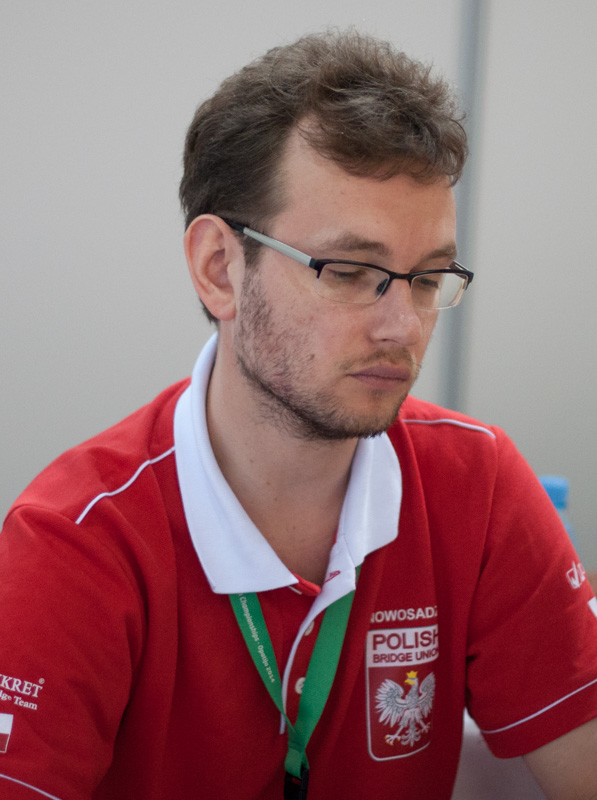
Nowosadzki in 2014

Michal Nowosadzki (born 8th. March 1983) is a Polish professional bridge player. Representing Poland, Nowosadzki won the 2015 and 2019 Bermuda Bowl. Nowosadzki is a World Grand Master and as of July 2020, ranked fifth in the world by the World Bridge Federation. His regular partner is Jacek Kalita. In July 2020, he admitted to cheating online by looking at all four hands "self-kibitzing".

== Bridge accomplishments ==
=== Wins ===
- Bermuda Bowl (2) 2015, 2019
- North American Bridge Championships (7)
  - Spingold (2) 2013, 2019
  - Jacoby Open Swiss Teams (1) 2018
  - Reisinger (1) 2018
  - Mitchell Board-a-Match Teams (2) 2014, 2016
  - Keohane North American Swiss Teams (1) 2015

=== Runners-up ===
- North American Bridge Championships (4)
  - Roth Open Swiss Teams (1) 2016
  - Reisinger (1) 2019
  - Keohane North American Swiss Teams (2) 2014, 2016
