= Jeff Wolfson =

American bridge player (born 1953)

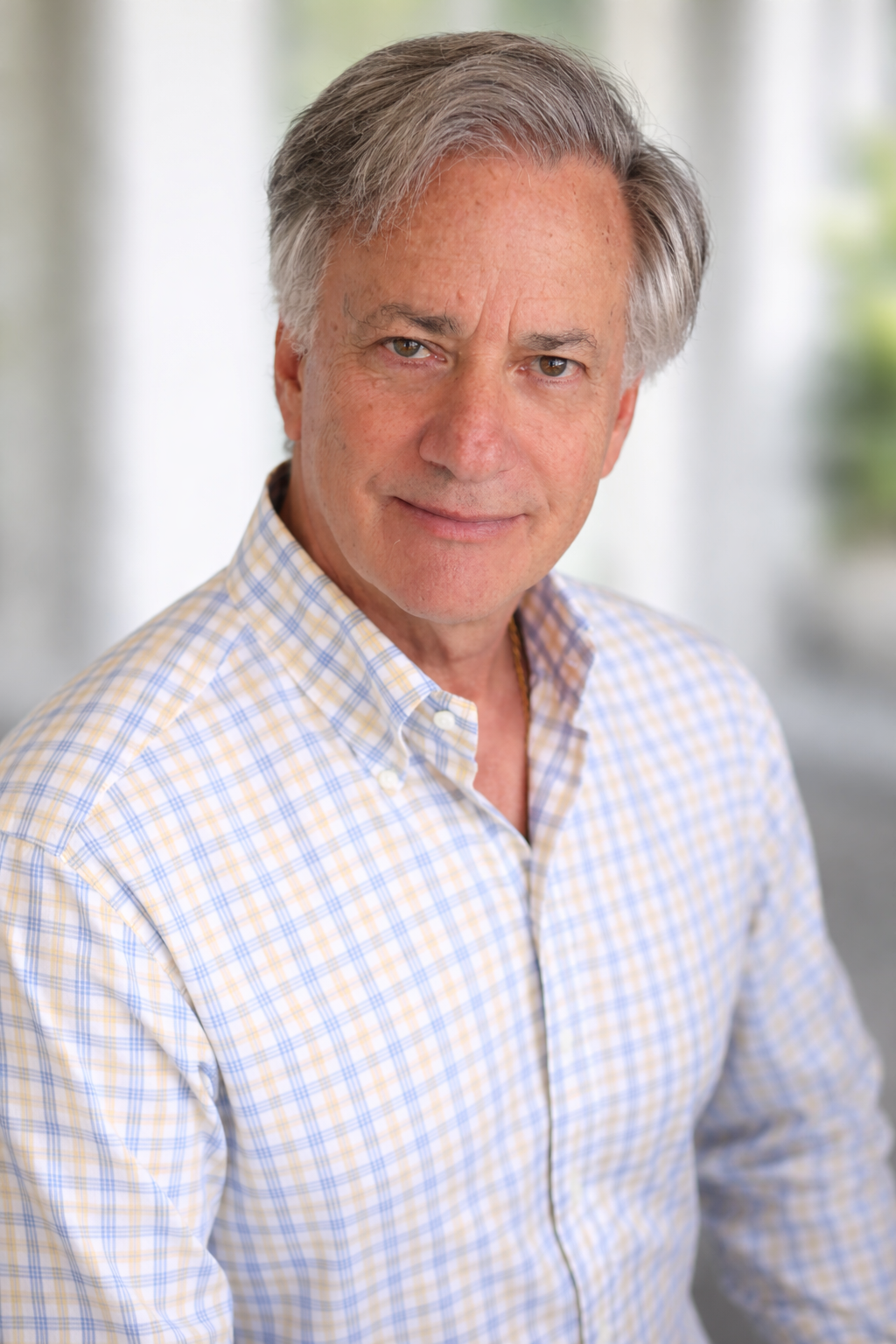
Jeff Wolfson

Jeffrey (Jeff) Wolfson (born 1953) is an American bridge player. He has won two World Championships - the D’orsi Trophy in 2017 and 2025 - and multiple North American Bridge Championships, including the Spingold, Vanderbilt and Life Master Pairs

== Bridge career ==
=== Major titles ===
- D’orsi Trophy 2017, 2025
- Spingold 2025
- Grand National Teams Championship Flight 1997,2023
- Vanderbilt Knockout Teams 2019,2023
- North American Swiss Teams 1999
- Life Master Pairs 1994
- Mitchell Board-a-Match Teams 1991

=== Runners-up ===
- Vanderbilt 2025
- European Transnational Championships, Montecatini, 2017
- Grand National Teams Championship Flight 1992

=== Bronze ===
- World Bridge Series Rand Cup 2018
- Bermuda Bowl 2000
