= Krzysztof Buras =

Polish bridge player

Krzysztof Buras is a Polish bridge player.

== Bridge accomplishments ==
=== Wins ===
- Cavendish Invitational Pairs (1) 2014
- North American Bridge Championships (1)
  - Roth Open Swiss Teams (1) 2009

=== Runners-up ===
- World Transnational Open Teams Championship (1) 2009
- World Olympiad Teams Championship (1) 2012
- North American Bridge Championships (3)
  - Jacoby Open Swiss Teams (1) 2008
  - Keohane North American Swiss Teams (1) 2012
  - Reisinger (1) 2013
