= Krzysztof Jassem =

Polish bridge player

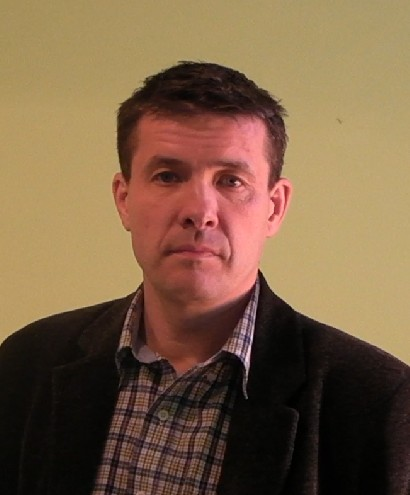
Krzysztof Jassem,2010

Krzysztof Jassem (born 1965) is a Polish bridge player.

== Bridge accomplishments ==
=== Awards ===
- Mott-Smith Trophy (1) 2008

=== Wins ===
- North American Bridge Championships (1)
  - Vanderbilt (1) 2008

=== Runners-up ===
- World Transnational Open Teams Championship (1) 1997
- World Olympiad Teams Championship (1) 2000
- North American Bridge Championships (2)
  - Fast Open Pairs (2) 2013, 2014
