= Pietro Forquet =

Italian bridge player (1925–2023)

Pietro Forquet (2 July 1925 – 27 January 2023) was an Italian bridge player, one of the most famous in bridge history. He won 15 World championship titles with the Blue Team, playing with Eugenio Chiaradia, Guglielmo Siniscalco and, for the most part, Benito Garozzo. Apart from his excellent play, he was renowned for his nerves of steel.

Forquet and Garozzo wrote a book (1967, in Italian) on the Blue Club bidding system, the 1950s Neapolitan system as modified by their partnership, which was published in English as The Italian Blue Team bridge book (1969). In 1971 he wrote Gioca con il Blue Team, published in English as Bridge with the Blue Team, which is widely considered to be the world's best collection of fascinating bridge deals.

== Personal life and death ==
Forquet was born in Naples on 2 July 1925. Before becoming a full-time bridge player, he was a bank manager. In the July 1963 issue of Sports Illustrated he was described as "suave, handsome, well-tailored, polite, quick-witted and tough". He died on 27 January 2023, at the age of 97.

== Books ==
- The Italian Blue Team bridge book, Benito Garozzo and Forquet with Enzo Mingoni, 274 pp. (Grosset & Dunlap, 1969) OCLC 77773; (Cassell & Co, 1970) – transl. of Il Fiori Blue Team (Milan: Prati, 1967) OCLC 59797539
- Bridge with the Blue Team, translated by Helen Thompson, ed. Ron Klinger, 384 pp. (Sydney: A.B. Publications, 1983) OCLC 27615808; (Gollancz, 1987, ISBN 0-575-06391-2) – transl. of Gioca con il Blue Team. 150 smazzate giocate dal vero (Milan: Ugo Mursia editore, 1971)

A Chinese-language edition of Gioca con il Blue Team was published in 1990, Lan dui qiao pai. OCLC 424718859

== Bridge accomplishments ==
World championships

Forquet won 15 world championships, all as one of six players on the Italy open team-of-four.

- Bermuda Bowl (12) 1957, 1958, 1959, 1961, 1962, 1963, 1965, 1966, 1967, 1969, 1973, 1974
- World Open Team Olympiad (3) 1964, 1968, 1972

Runners-up

- Bermuda Bowl 1951, 1976
- Olympiad 1976

European championships

- European Open Teams (5) 1951, 1956, 1957, 1958, 1959

Runners-up: none
