= Bas Drijver =

Dutch bridge player

Bas Drijver is a Dutch professional bridge player who plays for Switzerland. He is known for his successful partnership with Sjoert Brink.

== Bridge accomplishments ==
=== Wins ===
- Bermuda Bowl (3) 2011, 2022, 2023
- World Bridge Games (1) 2016
- North American Bridge Championships (3)
  - Reisinger (1) 2018
  - Spingold Knockout Teams (1) 2019
  - Soloway Knockout Teams (1) 2019

=== Runners-up ===
- World Olympiad Teams Championship (1) 2004
- North American Bridge Championships (4)
  - Jacoby Open Swiss Teams (1) 2011
  - Blue Ribbon Pairs (1) 2010
  - Reisinger (1) 2019
  - Vanderbilt (1) 2013
