= Sjoert Brink =

Dutch professional bridge player

- Born: 1981 (age 43–44); Netherlands

Sjoert Brink (born 1981 in Zevenhuizen, Zuidplas) is a Dutch professional bridge player who plays for Switzerland. He is known for his successful partnership with Bas Drijver.

== Bridge accomplishments ==
=== Wins ===
- Bermuda Bowl (3) 2011, 2022, 2023
- North American Bridge Championships (4)
  - Reisinger Board-a-Match Teams (1) 2018
  - Spingold Knockout Teams (1) 2019
  - Soloway Knockout Teams (2) 2019, 2023

=== Runners-up ===
- World Olympiad Teams Championship (1) 2004
- North American Bridge Championships (4)
  - Jacoby Open Swiss Teams (1) 2011
  - Blue Ribbon Pairs (1) 2010
  - Reisinger (1) 2019
  - Vanderbilt (1) 2013
