= Tim Seres =

Australian bridge player

Thomas Peter "Tim" Seres (1 April 1925 – 27 September 2007) was an Australian bridge player, generally considered among the best to represent the country internationally. He was a contributor to several magazines and awarded the Medal of the Order of Australia in 1988 for his services to bridge.

Born in Hungary and raised on the family farm, his parents were killed in World War II. He and his elder brother, George, survived the bombing of Budapest and the Russian occupation and were helped by their aunt and uncle to get passage to Australia in 1947; he immediately obtained a job in a textile factory despite his lack of English.

Seres had played cards from the age of six and was an accomplished chess player and was soon playing bridge six nights a week to escape the tedium of his factory work. Within eleven months after arriving in Sydney, he won the Australian National Championships, representing New South Wales. While winning consistently locally and nationally, it was in 1958 that Seres and his longtime tournament partner, Dick Cummings, first began to compete in Europe, representing Australia for years to come. For a period, Seres was automatically selected to represent Australia and was able to choose his own partner; they would be joined by four other players who had to go through selection trials.

In an obituary that appeared in Australian Bridge, reproduced on the Australian Bridge Federation website, Denis Howard wrote: "The simplest way to describe Tim’s standing in the Australian bridge world is to quote Shakespeare: 'He doth bestride the narrow world like a colossus'. Unarguably so much better than anyone else, Tim was one of the huge natural talents that very occasionally surface in competitive endeavours."

Seres attributed much of his success to his card play as a declarer and defender. A very fast player, he had a photographic memory; he once said, "I have hardly ever forgotten a card in my life if it's been played in front of me."

Aside from bridge, Seres had an enduring interest in horse racing and developed a betting system, broadly used in Australia. A lifelong bachelor, he lived in a flat in Randwick overlooking Botany Bay. He never owned a car and got around in taxis. According to Howard, he was "an intelligent, courteous and perceptive man of considerable personal charm".

== Bridge accomplishments ==
- Numerous club championships and over 70 state titles.
- Represented Australia in the Open Team at the Olympiad 1960, 1964, 1968, 1972 and 1976.
- Represented Australia in Open Team at the Bermuda Bowl 1971, 1976, 1977, 1979 and 1981.
- Seres helped to develop the New South Wales System – a bidding method based on the Vienna Club system.
- In 1965, Seres was credited with discovering a new type of squeeze play – known as the Seres Squeeze.

== Works ==
- Neil, Bennetts; Seres, Tim (1981). Audio Interview with Tim Seres, champion Australian contract bridge player. OCLC 221527673. Audiobook: Reel-to-reel tape: English. Recorded in Randwick, New South Wales on 9 January 1981.
- Courtney, Michael; Seres, Tim (1995). Play Cards with Tim Seres. Australian bridge art, 1. Double Bay, N.S.W. : Michael Courtney. ISBN 978-0-646-23564-6. OCLC 38378544.
