= Glenn Grøtheim =

Norwegian bridge player

Glenn Frode Grøtheim (born 2 September 1959) is a Norwegian bridge player, WBF World Grand Master, winner of the 2007 Bermuda Bowl and a regular member of the Norwegian team since 1987.

In 1980, at the age of just 21, he won a gold medal with the Norwegian team at the European Junior Teams in Tel Aviv. Two third-place finishes in 1982 and 1984 followed. In 1987, partnering Ulf Tundal, he debuted as a member of Norwegian open team in the European Teams Championship in Brighton, finishing third. In 1993, Norway again won the bronze medal in the European Teams Championship in Menton, France. Later the same year they reached the final of Bermuda Bowl in Santiago de Chile, where they lost to the young Dutch team. In 1997, they again won the European bronze medal, and lost to France in the Bermuda Bowl semifinals, held in Tunis, ending up third by beating the United States for the bronze. The same team earned the European silver medal in the Tenerife in 2001 ending behind Italy, and later lost the Bermuda Bowl final in Paris to the United States. Another European bronze medal followed in 2002. In 2007 the team won the Bermuda Bowl, by beating the United States in the final.

He has been a Norwegian champion 16 times, and was ranked fifth on the Norwegian master point ranking in 2006. After playing with Ulf Tundal and Geir Helgemo, he gained most of his successes with Terje Aa from 1993 to 2006 before rejoining Tundal.

He is also a frequent contributor to Scandinavian bridge magazines. He lives just outside Trondheim, Norway, with his wife and two sons where he is an electrical engineer.

He and his partners have regularly employed a Precision-based relay system, about which he has written a book; the English edition, with Alan Sontag, is titled "The Viking Precision Club - A Relay System for the 21st Century".
