= Jacek Kalita =

Polish bridge player

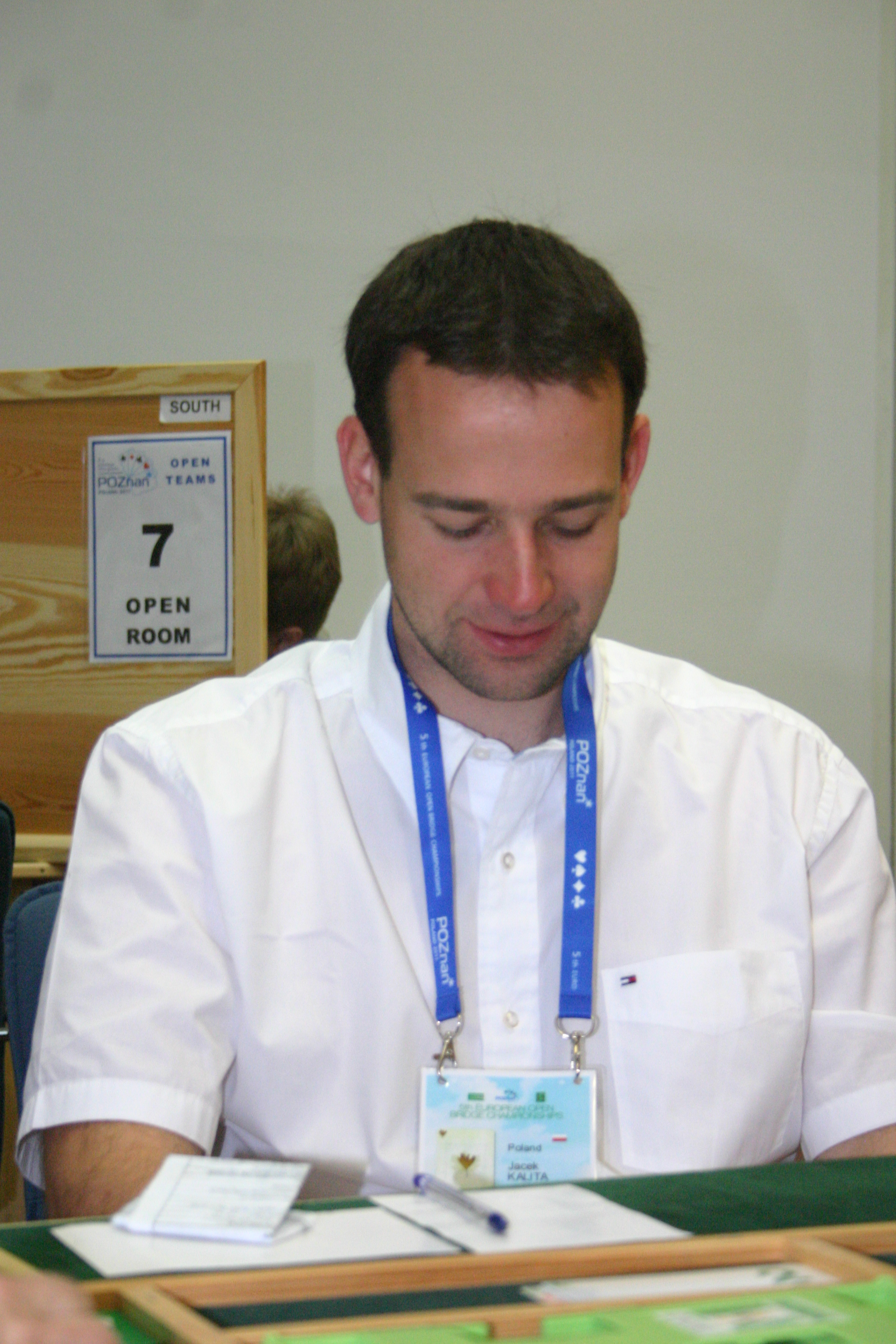
Jacek Kalita

Jacek Kalita is a Polish professional bridge player. Representing Poland, Kalita won the 2015 and 2019 Bermuda Bowl. Kalita is a World Grand Master and as of July 2020, ranked second in the world by the World Bridge Federation. His regular partner is Michal Nowosadzki.

== Bridge accomplishments ==
- Bermuda Bowl (1) 2015, 2019
- North American Bridge Championships (7)
  - Spingold (2) 2013, 2019
  - Jacoby Open Swiss Teams (1) 2018
  - Reisinger (1) 2018
  - Mitchell Board-a-Match Teams (2) 2014, 2016
  - Keohane North American Swiss Teams (1) 2015
  - Kaplan Blue Ribbon Pairs (1) 2022

=== Runners-up ===
- North American Bridge Championships (4)
  - Roth Open Swiss Teams (1) 2016
  - Reisinger (1) 2019
  - Keohane North American Swiss Teams (2) 2014, 2016
