= Boris Koytchou =

American bridge player

Boris Koytchou (1919 – 30 April 2006) was an American bridge player who played internationally both for France and North America.

He was also a highly talented croquet player and a very successful rubber bridge player, mainly at the Regency Whist Club. Koytchou was one of the most popular players of his generation, and was that rarity in competitive bridge, a successful player about whom nobody had an unpleasant word to say.

He was born in Russia in 1919, but after the revolution his family settled first in what is now Istanbul; they then moved to Paris. He spent most of World War II in a German prison camp. He began playing bridge full time after the war and represented France in the European Championship in 1948, 1949 and 1950.

He came to the United States in 1953 and lived most of his life in Manhattan till his death in 2006.

== Bridge accomplishments ==
=== Awards ===
- Fishbein Trophy (1) 1960

=== Wins ===
- North American Bridge Championships (2)
  - Spingold (2) 1956, 1960

=== Runners-up ===
- Bermuda Bowl (1) 1957
- North American Bridge Championships (3)
  - Vanderbilt (3) 1955, 1962, 1965
