= Mark Blumenthal =

German physician (1831–1921)

Mark Blumenthal (July 11, 1831 – January 11, 1921) was a German-born Jewish-American physician.

== Life ==
Blumenthal was born on July 11, 1831, in Altenstadt, Kingdom of Bavaria, the son of Lawrence Blumenthal and Rebecka Mayer. Lawrence had been a disciple of Sekl Loeb Wormser, the Baal Shem of Michelstadt, and Rebecka was the daughter of Rabbi Josef ben Maÿer.

Blumenthal immigrated to America with his parents in 1839. He attended the academy in Chambersburg, Pennsylvania, as well as public and high schools in Philadelphia. He graduated from the College of Physicians and Surgeons at Columbia University in New York City, New York, as a doctor of medicine in 1852. He served as assistant physician in Blackwell's Island Hospital from 1851 to 1852 and as deputy coroner of New York City in 1853. He then visited Europe in 1854 and worked as an attending physician in London, Paris, and Munich. When he returned to America, he was appointed resident and attending physician at the Jews' Hospital (later known as Mount Sinai Hospital). He held that position from 1854 to 1859, organizing the hospital's medical administration and formulating its records and monthly reports that were still in use decades later.

During the American Civil War, Blumenthal served in the Third Regiment of the New York National Guard with the rank of surgeon-major. From 1862 to 1894, he was president and chief physician of the Institution for the Improved Instruction of Deaf Mutes, a Jewish institution that worked with deaf mutes regardless of their religion. There, he introduced a new system of teaching almost unheard of in America at the time, teaching the patients to read lips and not rely on dactylology. He served as chairman of the obstetrics department at the New York Academy of Medicine and as president of the Medical Union, the Northwestern Medical and Surgical Society, the New York Physicians' Mutual Association, and the Medical Board of the United Hebrew Charities. He also wrote a number of scientific articles for various medical journals. He practiced medicine in New York City for a total of 47 years.

Blumenthal was a founder of the Young Men's Hebrew Association, founder and president of the Sabbath Observance Society of New York, and president of the Jewish Chautauqua from 1901 to 1902. He was a trustee of Congregation Shearith Israel. He was married (1) 1863 in Philadelphia, with Rabbi Isaac Leeser officiating, Selina Asch. She died 1899 in Rome. In 1906, in London, in the presence of Moses Gaster, he married Emilie Adler.

Blumenthal died at home on January 11, 1921.
