= John Swanson (bridge) =

American bridge player

John C. Swanson, Jr. (born 1937) is an American bridge player living in Lancaster, California. Swanson has won 1 Bermuda Bowl, and 5 North American Bridge Championships.

== Bridge accomplishments ==
=== International Events ===
- Bermuda Bowl (4)
  - 1977 First
  - 1975 Second
  - 1973 Fourth
  - 1971 Sixth
- World Open Pairs (1)
  - 1978 Fifth

=== American Contract Bridge League (ACBL) ===
- Team Trials (5)
  - 1976 First
  - 1974 First
  - 1972 First
  - 1970 First
  - 1969 Second
- North American Bridge Championship Wins (5)
  - Grand National Teams (2) 1974, 1976
  - Vanderbilt (2) 1969, 1977
  - Mitchell Board-a-Match Teams (1) 1970
- North American Bridge Championship Runners-Up (2)
  - Nail Life Master Open Pairs (1) 1968
  - Spingold (1) 1973

=== Writing ===
- Southern California Bridge News, Bidding Forum Moderator 1978-1987
- Western Conference Contract Bridge Forum, Bidding Forum Moderator 2009–present
- Author, “Inside the Bermuda Bowl” (1998)
- The Bridge World, contributor
- ACBL Bulletin, contributor
- Recap Bridge, Co-author (1972, 1973)

=== Bridge Theory ===
- Co-developer of the Walsh System
