= Walter Avarelli =

Walter Avarelli (3 June 1912 – 1987) was an Italian bridge player, a member of the famous Blue Team, with whom he won nine Bermuda Bowls and three World Team Olympiads from 1956 to 1972.

Avarelli was born in Rome and became a judge there. He first took up rudimentary bridge during World War II when more than thirty years old. Along with interests in tennis, riding and motor racing, he was especially noted for "his addiction to gastronomy".

Avarelli was the longtime partner of Giorgio Belladonna using the Roman Club bidding system. They improved the system together and presented it in a book that was published in at least two Italian editions, 1958 and 1969.

- Il sistema fiori romano, Giorgio Belladonna and Walter Avarelli (1958), 163 pp.; 3rd edition (Bridge d'oggi, 1969), 181 pp., OCLC 220620707
- The Roman Club System of Distributional Bidding, Giorgio Belladonna and Walter Avarelli (Simon & Schuster, 1959; Cassell, 1960)

== Bridge accomplishments ==
World championships

Avarelli won 12 world championships, all as one of six players on the Italy open team-of-four.

- Bermuda Bowl (9) 1957, 1958, 1959, 1961, 1962, 1965, 1966, 1967, 1969
- World Team Olympiad (3) 1964, 1968, 1972

Runners-up: none. He joined the Italy team after its second-place finish in the 1951 Bermuda Bowl and retired before its double second-place finish in 1976.

European championships

- European Open Teams (4) 1956, 1957, 1958, 1959
