= Mike Lawrence (bridge) =

American bridge expert

Michael Steven Lawrence (born May 28, 1940) is an American bridge player, teacher, theorist, and prolific writer.

== Biography ==
Lawrence was born in San Francisco. He started playing bridge while he was a chemistry student at the University of California; as result of a self-inflicted hand injury, he had to postpone the final exams and started playing bridge as a pastime. Bridge became his major interest and he devoted his subsequent life to it.

In 1968, he was invited by Ira Corn to join the newly formed Dallas Aces team. He formed a partnership with Bobby Goldman, with whom he played a 2/1 game forcing system. They started by winning several North American Bridge Championships and, after a long Italian Blue Team reign, returned the world crown to America by winning the Bermuda Bowls in 1970 and 1971. Lawrence and James Jacoby left the Aces in 1973.

Under Ira Corn's mentorship, Lawrence started teaching bridge and subsequently writing books. He has written more than thirty books. He received numerous book-of-the-year awards starting with his first book, How to Read Your Opponents' Cards. He contributed to the theory of 2/1 game forcing systems, and his "2/1 semi-forcing" approach competes with Max Hardy's "unconditional forcing" approach. Together, they wrote the book Standard Bridge Bidding for the 21st Century in 2000. He also helped develop educational bridge software with Fred Gitelman.

In addition to his world championships with the Aces, Lawrence has won another Bermuda Bowl in 1987 in partnership with Hugh Ross along with teammates Hamman, Wolff, Martel, and Stansby.

== Bridge accomplishments ==
=== Awards ===
- Herman Trophy (1) 1965

=== Wins ===
- Bermuda Bowl (3) 1970, 1971, 1987
- North American Bridge Championships (16)
  - von Zedtwitz Life Master Pairs (1) 1984
  - Wernher Open Pairs (1) 1984
  - Grand National Teams (1) 1987
  - Vanderbilt (5) 1967, 1971, 1973, 1977, 1985
  - Mitchell Board-a-Match Teams (2) 1964, 1968
  - Chicago Mixed Board-a-Match (1) 1992
  - Reisinger (4) 1965, 1970, 1977, 1980
  - Spingold (1) 1969

=== Runners-up ===
- Bermuda Bowl (2) 1973, 1989
- North American Bridge Championships
  - Blue Ribbon Pairs (4) 1965, 1968, 1971, 1983
  - Nail Life Master Open Pairs (1) 1978
  - Jacoby Open Swiss Teams (1) 1994
  - Vanderbilt (1) 1970
  - Keohane North American Swiss Teams (1) 1996
  - Mitchell Board-a-Match Teams (1) 1969
  - Reisinger (1) 1983
  - Spingold (4) 1970, 1976, 1980, 1985

== Publications ==
Dates indicate original publication date and revised/later edition publication date.

- How to Read Your Opponent's Cards: The Bridge Experts' Way to Locate Missing High Cards (1973; 2nd ed. 1986)
- Winning Backgammon (1973)
- Introduction to Contract Bridge and Point Count Bidding (with Gerald Fox, 1975)
- Judgment at Bridge (1976)
- The Complete Book on Overcalls in Contract Bridge (1979; 2nd ed. 2009)
- True Bridge Humor (1980)
- The Complete Book on Balancing in Contract Bridge (1981; rev. ed. 2012)
- Play a Swiss Teams of Four with Mike Lawrence (1982)
- Dynamic Defense (1982)
- The Complete Book on Hand Evaluation in Contract Bridge (1983)
- The Jacoby & Texas Transfers Convention (1983)
- The Lebensohl Convention (1983)
- Major Suit Raises (1983)
- Partnership Understandings (1983; 4th ed. 1990)
- Play Bridge with Mike Lawrence (1983)
- Winning Bridge Intangibles (wth Keith Hanson, 1985)
- Falsecards (1986; 2nd ed. 2014)
- Mike Lawrence's Workbook on the Two Over One System (1987)
- The Ultimate Guide to Winning Scrabble Brand Crossword Game (with John Ozag, 1987)
- How to Play Card Combinations (1988)
- The Complete Guide to Passed Hand Bidding (1989; 2nd ed. 2011)
- Mike Lawrences's Bidding Quizzes, Volume 1: The Uncontested Auction (1990)
- Topics on Bridge, Series 1 - Numbers 1-15 (1990)
- The Complete Guide to Contested Auctions (1992)
- Topics on Bridge, Series 2 - Numbers 16-30 (1992)
- The Complete Book on Takeout Doubles (1994; 2nd ed. 2012)
- Disturbing Opponents No Trump (1995)
- Opening Leads (1996)
- Opening Leads for Acol Players (with Ron Klinger, 1997)
- Double! New Meanings for an Old Bid (2002)
- I Fought the Law of Total Tricks (with Anders Wirgen, 2004)
- Tips on Bidding - Mike Lawrence Bridge Tips (2015)
- Tips on Competitive Bidding - Mike Lawrence Bridge Tips (2015)
- Tips on Cardplay - Mike Lawrence Bridge Tips (2015)
- Judgment at Bridge 2: Be a Better Player and More Difficult Opponent (2017)
- Insights on Bridge, Book 1: Moments in Bidding (2019)
- Insights on Bridge, Book 2: Bid, Play, and Defend (2020)
- Insights on Bridge, Book 3: Bid, Play, and Defend (2022)
- My Life with Bridge (2024)
