= World Transnational Open Teams Championship =

Major side event conducted by the World Bridge Federation

The World Transnational Open Teams Championship is a major side event conducted by the World Bridge Federation during the semifinal and final stages of its world championships for national teams at contract bridge—the Bermuda Bowl, Venice Cup, and Senior Bowl. New teams may enter the Transnational, as well as national teams eliminated before the semifinals of the main events—Open, Women, and Seniors respectively. It is not required that all team members be from one country, hence the term transnational. A series of Swiss matches qualifies eight teams for three knockout rounds which conclude during the finals of the main events.

The 15-day "World Team Championships" meet occurs in odd years and the first Transnational Open was added to the program in 1997. The eighth rendition was held in October 2011 in Veldhoven, Netherlands.

Pierre Zimmermann's professional teams have won the last two renditions and "Zimmermann" will be the favorite again. Beginning 2011, the Italian pair Fantoni–Nunes and Norwegian pair Helgemo–Helness, from the 2007 and 2009 winners respectively, have been hired to join Zimmermann–Multon full-time, under contract expiring 2016. (From 2012 all six members will be citizens of Monaco and the team will be a prohibitive favorite to represent Monaco internationally.)

The 2013 edition was won by the USA's Gordon team.

== Results ==
The World Transnational has always been a major side event conducted alongside the Bermuda Bowl and Venice Cup. Recently it has been possible to enter the Transnational Teams after elimination from the main events before their semifinals.

Year, Site, Entries		Medalists
1997 Hammamet, Tunisia 74 teams	1.	(Italy) (Poland) Burgay; Leandro Burgay (ITA), Dano De Falco (ITA), Marcin Leśniewski (POL), Carlo Mariani (ITA), Krzysztof Martens (POL)
1997 Hammamet, Tunisia 74 teams	2.	Jassem; Krzysztof Jassem, Ireneusz Kowalczyk, Piotr Tuszyński, Marek Witek (Poland)
1997 Hammamet, Tunisia 74 teams	3.	Gardynik; Grzegorz Gardynik, Michał Kwiecień, Tomasz Przybora, Jacek Pszczoła (Poland)
2000 Southampton, Bermuda 73	1.	(United States) (Poland) Meltzer; Cezary Balicki (POL), Rose Meltzer (USA), Alan Sontag (USA), Peter Weichsel (USA), Adam Żmudziński (POL)
2000 Southampton, Bermuda 73	2.	(Canada) (United States) Milner; Fred Gitelman (CAN), Marc Jacobus (USA), Bobby Levin (USA), Reese Milner (USA), Brad Moss (USA)
2000 Southampton, Bermuda 73	3.	Mihov V. Kalin Karaivanov, Vladimir Mihov, Ivan Nanev, Borislav Popov, Jerry Stamatov, Roumen Trendafilov (Bulgaria)
2001 Paris, France 74	1.	(Brazil) (United States) Brachman; Diego Brenner (BRA), Gabriel Chagas (BRA), Geoff Hampson (USA), Mike Passell (USA), Michael Seamon (USA), Eddie Wold (USA)
2001 Paris, France 74	2.	Bureau; Danièle Allouche-Gaviard, Cyril Bureau, Vanessa Reess, Philippe Selz, Patrick Sussel (France)
2001 Paris, France 74	3.	Grinberg; Yoram Aviram, Michael Barel, Ilan Herbst, Ophir Herbst, Doron Yadlin, Israel Yadlin (Israel)
2003 Monte Carlo, Monaco 74	1.	Lavazza; Andrea Buratti, Leandro Burgay, Mario D'Avossa, Guido Ferraro, Massimo Lanzarotti, Carlo Mariani (Italy)
2003 Monte Carlo, Monaco 74	2.	Zhuang; FU Zhong, SHI Haojun, WANG Weimin, Jack Zhao, ZHUANG Zejun (China)
2003 Monte Carlo, Monaco 74	3.	Jansma; Simon de Wijs, Jan Jansma, Bauke Muller, Louk Verhees (Netherlands)
2005 Estoril, Portugal 134	1.	(United States) (Poland) Schneider; Grant Baze (USA), Piotr Gawryś (POL), Marcin Leśniewski (POL), Peter Schneider (USA)
2005 Estoril, Portugal 134	2.	(United States) Spector; Bart Bramley, Björn Fallenius, Mark Feldman, Chip Martel, Warren Spector, Roy Welland (USA)
2005 Estoril, Portugal 134	3.	777; Alexander Dubinin, Andrei Gromov, Jouri Khokhlov, Max Khven (Russia)
2007 Shanghai, China 148	1.	(France) (Italy) (Switzerland) Zimmermann; Michel Bessis (FRA), Thomas Bessis (FRA), Fulvio Fantoni (ITA), Franck Multon (FRA), Claudio Nunes (ITA), Pierre Zimmermann (SUI)
2007 Shanghai, China 148	2.	(Poland) Russia; Cezary Balicki (POL), Alexander Dubinin (RUS), Andrei Gromov (RUS), Victoria Gromova (RUS), Tatiana Ponomareva (RUS), Adam Żmudziński (POL)
2007 Shanghai, China 148	3.	(Poland) Germany Open; Tomek Gotard (GER), Jacek Leśniczak (POL), Josef Piekarek (GER), Alexander Smirnov (GER)
2009 São Paulo, Brazil 68	1.	(Poland) (Norway) (France) Zimmermann; Cezary Balicki (POL), Geir Helgemo (NOR), Tor Helness (NOR), Franck Multon (FRA), Pierre Zimmermann (FRA), Adam Żmudziński (POL)
2009 São Paulo, Brazil 68	2.	(United States) Apreo Logistic Poland; Krzysztof Buras (POL), Piotr Gawryś (POL), Jacek Kalita (POL), Krzysztof Kotorowicz (POL), Grzegorz Narkiewicz (POL), Jacek Pszczoła (USA)
2009 São Paulo, Brazil 68	3.	Deutschland; Michael Gromöller, Andreas Kirmse, Josef Piekarek, Alexander Smirnov (Germany)
2011 October 15–29 Veldhoven, Netherlands 151 teams	1.	Israel Juniors; Alon Birman, Lotan Fisher, Gal Gerstner, Moshe Meyuchas, Dror Padon, Ron Schwartz (Israel)
2011 October 15–29 Veldhoven, Netherlands 151 teams	2.	OZ Open; Nabil Edgtton, John Paul Gosney, Hugh Grosvenor, Sartaj Hans, Tony Nunn, George Bilski (Australia)
2011 October 15–29 Veldhoven, Netherlands 151 teams	3.	Parimatch; Andrey Gromov, Yury Khiuppenen, Jouri Khokhlov, Vadim Kholomeev, Mikhail Krasnosselski, Georgi Matushko (Russia)
2013 September 24–29 Nusa Dua, Indonesia 102 teams	1.	(United States) Gordon; David Berkowitz, Jacek Pszczoła, Pratap Rajadhyaksh, Michael Seamon, Alan Sontag, Mark Gordon (PC), Susie Miller (Coach)
2013 September 24–29 Nusa Dua, Indonesia 102 teams	2.	(Chile) SAIC VW; Dai Jianming, Shao Zi Jian, Yang Lixin, Zhuang Zejun, Hu Mao Yuan, Liu Yi Qian, Zhang, Jiangliang (NPC), Cai Longgen (Coach).
2013 September 24–29 Nusa Dua, Indonesia 102 teams	3.	(Netherlands) White House; Jan Jansma, Richard Ritmeijer, Magdalena Ticha, Gert-Jan Paulissen (PC)
