= Giorgio Belladonna =

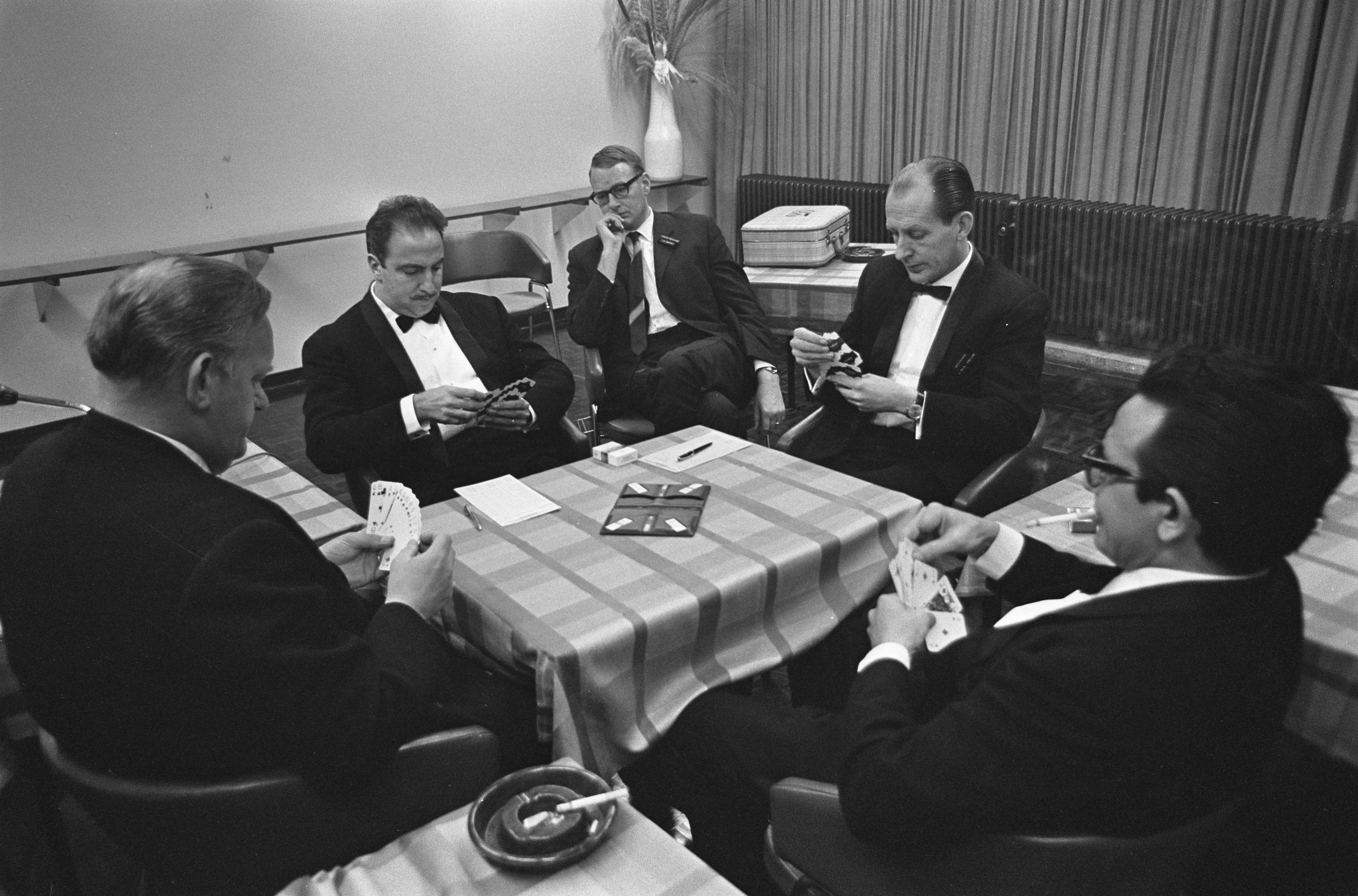
Garozzo & Belladonna (1967)

Giorgio Belladonna (7 June 1923 – 12 May 1995) was an Italian bridge player, one of the greatest of all time. He won 16 world championship titles with the Blue Team, playing with Walter Avarelli from 1956 to 1969 and later with Benito Garozzo. A leading theoretician, he was the principal inventor of the Roman Club bidding system, from 1956, and with Benito Garozzo after 1969 created Super Precision, a complex, strong club-based method. He was known as much for his mercurial temperament as for the brilliance of his card play; see, for example, Belladonna coup.

Belladonna was married to Maria Antonietta and had one daughter and one son. He died of lung cancer, according to his daughter, on 12 May 1995 in Rome.

Alan Truscott described him as "a cheerful extrovert" and "normally unflappable at the table". He had been "a potential soccer star, but World War II interrupted that career path". He worked in the Social Security Administration until 1970.

== Bridge accomplishments ==
=== World championships ===
Wins

Belladonna won 16 world championships, all as a member of the Italian open team-of-four.

- Bermuda Bowl (13) 1957, 1958, 1959, 1961, 1962, 1963, 1965, 1966, 1967 and 1969; 1973, 1974, 1975
- World Team Olympiad (3) 1964, 1968, 1972

From 1957 to 1969, the Blue Team, with nearly uniform personnel and partnerships, won all 10 Bermuda Bowl tournaments (after 1959, as defending champion with another European champion in the field). It placed 6th in the inaugural 1960 Olympiad tournament and won the 1964 and 1968 renditions. After 1969, there were some retirements, including Avarelli's, and some rearrangements, including Belladonna's and Garozzo's establishment of their partnership. In 1975, Italy won its last open team world championship (until 2005) with Belladonna and Garozzo alone "survivors from the great Blue Team".

Runners-up

- Bermuda Bowl 1976, 1979, 1983
- World Team Olympiad 1976

=== European championships ===
Wins

- European Open Teams (10) 1956, 1957, 1958, 1959, 1965, 1967, 1969, 1971, 1973, 1979

Runners-up

- European Open Teams (3) 1962, 1977, 1983
