= Kalin Karaivanov =

Bulgarian bridge player (1967–2019)

Personal details
- Born: 29 January 1967; Varna, Bulgaria
- Died: 7 September 2019 (aged 52); Mamaia, Romania

Kalin Karaivanov (Bulgarian: Калин Караиванов, 29 January 1967 – 7 September 2019) was a Bulgarian bridge player.

== Bridge accomplishments ==
=== Wins ===
- North American Bridge Championships (1)
  - Jacoby Open Swiss Teams (1) 2007

=== Runners-up ===
- Buffett Cup (1) 2012
