= Paul Soloway =

American bridge player (1941–2007)

Paul Soloway (October 10, 1941 – November 5, 2007) was a world champion American bridge player. He won the Bermuda Bowl world team championship five times and won 30 North American Bridge Championships "national"-level events.

Soloway was inducted into the ACBL Hall of Fame in 2002. At the time of his death he held 65,511.92 masterpoints – more than any other player in history, and more than 6000 points ahead of second place.

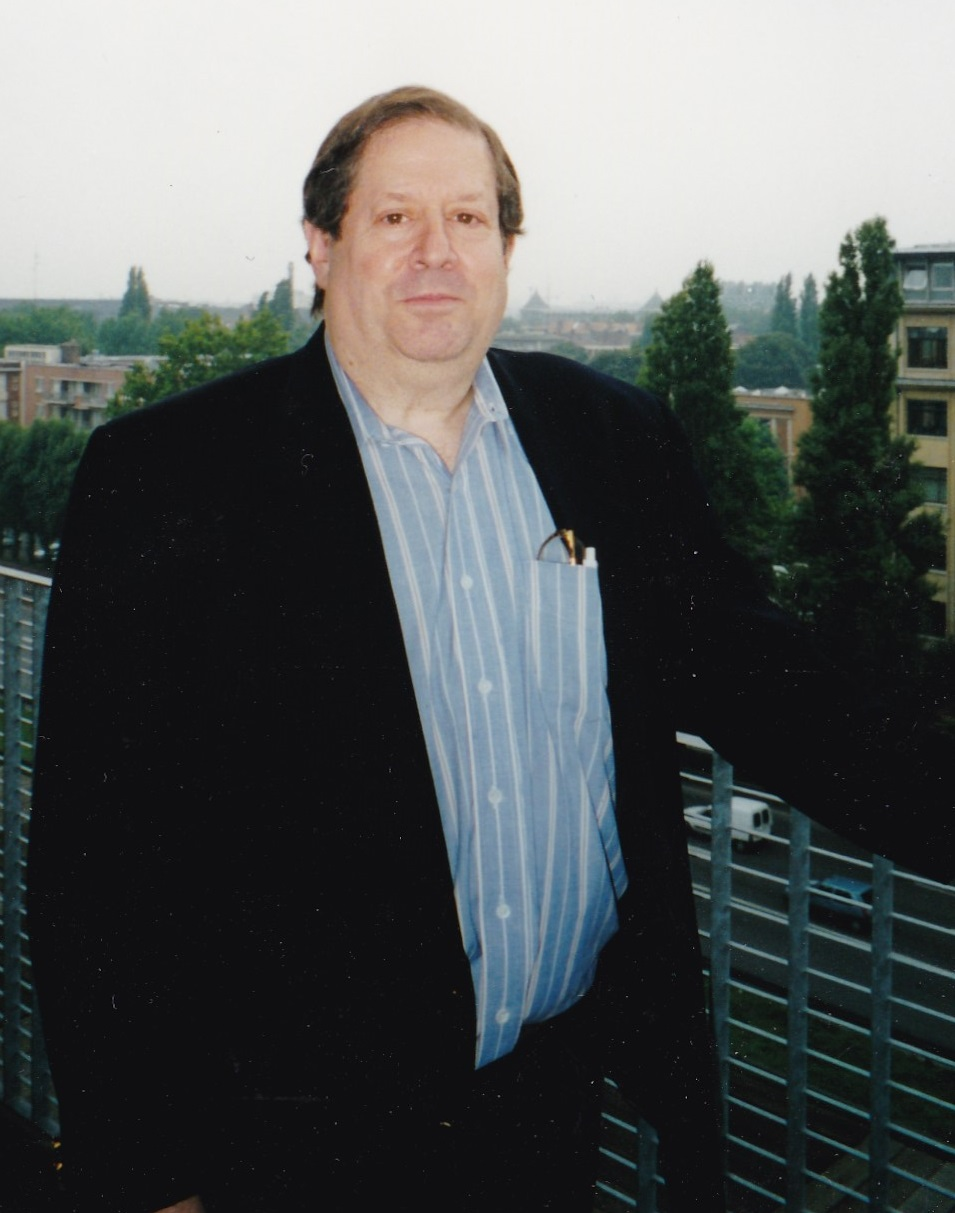
Paul Soloway at the 10th World Bridge Championships, Lille, France, 1998.

== Early life ==
Born and raised in Los Angeles, California, Soloway nearly drowned at age three when he fell into a swimming pool at the home of family friend George Raft. He was saved by his uncle, gangster Bugsy Siegel, who jumped into the pool and pulled him out.

Soloway learned to play bridge in college, where he majored in business studies. He first played duplicate bridge in 1962. Shortly after graduation, he became a bridge professional. In 1971, he joined the Dallas Aces bridge team, but left after one year. In 1998 he joined the Nick Nickell team. He lived in Mill Creek, Washington, and died at a hospital in Seattle, Washington, from a heart attack during his treatment for Staphylococcus aureus. He was cremated with a deck of bridge cards in his hand.

== Bridge accomplishments ==
=== Honors ===
- ACBL Hall of Fame, 2002
- Lazard Sportsmanship Award 2001

=== Awards ===
- ACBL Player of the Year 1998
- Barry Crane Top 500 1998
- McKenney Trophy 1968, 1969
- Mott-Smith Trophy 2002
- Fishbein Trophy 1998
- Herman Trophy 1976

=== Wins ===
- Bermuda Bowl (5) 1976, 1977, 1979, 2000, 2003
- North American Bridge Championships (30)
  - Vanderbilt (6) 1969, 1978, 1997, 1998, 2000, 2003
  - Spingold (9) 1978, 1983, 1986, 1988, 1998, 1999, 2004, 2006, 2007
  - Reisinger (4) 1976, 1980, 2004, 2005
  - Grand National Teams (2) 1974, 1976
  - Open Board-a-Match Teams (1) 1993
  - Jacoby Open Swiss Teams (3) 1991, 2002, 2006
  - North American Men's Swiss Teams (1) 1989
  - Master Mixed Teams (2) 1966, 1987
  - Life Master Open Pairs (1) 1999
  - Life Master Men's Pairs (1) 1965
- United States Bridge Championships (13)
  - Open Team Trials (13) 1972, 1974, 1975, 1977, 1979 (Jan), 1979 (Dec), 1984, 1995, 1998, 2001, 2002, 2004, 2007
- Other notable wins:
  - Buffett Cup (1) 2006
  - Cavendish Invitational Pairs (1) 1995

=== Runners-up ===
- Bermuda Bowl (2) 1975, 2005
- World Open Team Olympiad (2) 1972, 1980
- North American Bridge Championships (18)
  - Vanderbilt (3) 1971, 1976, 2002
  - Spingold (4) 1973, 1990, 1994, 1996
  - Reisinger (4) 1986, 1990, 1993, 1994
  - Open Board-a-Match Teams (3) 1995, 1998, 1999
  - Men's Board-a-Match Teams (2) 1970, 1984
  - Jacoby Open Swiss Teams (1) 2005
  - Men's Pairs (1) 1969
- United States Bridge Championships (1)
  - Open Team Trials(1) 1969
- Other notable 2nd places:
  - Cavendish Invitational Teams (5) 1998, 2004, 2005, 2006, 2007
  - Sunday Times Invitational Pairs (1) 1990
