= Carlo Mosca =

Italian prefect and magistrate (1945–2021)

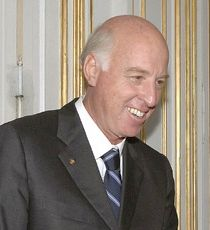
Carlo Mosca, 2010

Carlo Mosca (12 October 1945 – 30 March 2021) was an Italian prefect and magistrate.

He was a knight of the Order of Merit of the Italian Republic.
