= Alan Sontag =

American bridge player and writer

Alan M. Sontag (born May 2, 1946) is an American professional bridge player. He won six world championships, including two Bermuda Bowl wins. Sontag is also known for his book The Bridge Bum, which was described by the publisher as "on everybody's list of the top ten bridge books ever written."

== Bridge career ==
Besides the two Bermuda Bowls, his other victories are the Rosenblum Cup, Transnational Open Teams, Senior Bowl, numerous North American Bridge Championships, and two wins in the London Sunday Times and Cavendish Invitational Pairs. In 1973, he and Steve Altman became the first American players to win the Sunday Times Pairs, at the time the premier invitational tournament in the world. Two years later, Sontag returned to London and won the tournament again, this time with Peter Weichsel, with whom he formed one of the strongest partnerships in the world from the 1970s until 2005. The two were partners in the 1983 Bermuda Bowl tournament in Stockholm, when the United States defeated Italy in one of its most exciting final matches. Sontag returned to the final in 2001, in Paris, where team captain Rose Meltzer became the first woman to win the Bermuda Bowl. Meltzer teams including Sontag won the odd-years Senior Bowl in 2005 and 2007 and the open Rosenblum Cup in 2006. (During this time Weichsel and Kyle Larsen have been Meltzer's partners in international competition.)

Sontag was inducted into the ACBL Hall of Fame in 2007.

== Personal ==
Sontag was born in New York City. He and his wife, Robin, live in Gaithersburg, Maryland, with their son Robert.

Widely regarded as one of the fastest players in the world, he is known by his nickname Sonty.

== Bridge accomplishments ==
=== Honors ===
- ACBL Hall of Fame, 2007

=== Awards ===
- John E. Simon Award (Sportsman of the Year) 1974

=== Wins ===
- Bermuda Bowl (2) 1983, 2001
- Rosenblum Cup (1) 2006
- World Transnational Open Teams (1) 2000
- Senior Bowl (2) 2005, 2007
- North American Bridge Championships (16)
  - Vanderbilt (3) 1972, 1988, 1999
  - Spingold (3) 1980, 1982, 2000
  - Reisinger (1) 1973
  - Grand National Teams (1) 1994
  - Open Board-a-Match Teams (1) 2001
  - Men's Board-a-Match Teams (2) 1971, 1979
  - North American Men's Swiss Teams (2) 1985, 1987
  - Master Mixed Teams (1) 1989
  - Life Master Pairs (1) 1977
  - Life Master Men's Pairs (1) 1971
- United States Bridge Championships (3)
  - Open Team Trials (2) 1982, 1991
  - Senior Team Trials (1) 2004
- Other notable wins:
  - Generali Two Worlds Trophy (1) 1994
  - Lancia Challenge Match (1) 1975
  - Lancia Swiss Teams (1) 1975
  - Reisinger Knockout Teams (2) 1977, 1988
  - Sunday Times Invitational Pairs (2) 1973, 1975
  - Cavendish Invitational Pairs (2) 1976, 1977

=== Runners-up ===
- North American Bridge Championships (18)
  - Vanderbilt (5) 1975, 1981, 1983, 1989, 1997
  - Spingold (5) 1984, 1991, 1996, 1997, 2003
  - Reisinger (3) 1992, 1996, 1998
  - Men's Board-a-Match Teams (1) 1985
  - Mitchell Board-a-Match Teams (1) 2017
  - Jacoby Open Swiss Teams (1) 2000
  - Life Master Pairs (2) 1972, 1984
- United States Bridge Championships (5)
  - Open Team Trials (4) 1972, 1974, 1980, 1999
  - Senior Team Trials (1) 2007
- Other notable 2nd places:
  - Buffett Cup (1) 2008
  - Reisinger Knockout Teams (1) 1978
  - Goldman Pairs (1) 1976

== Books ==
- The Bridge Bum: My Life and Play, Morrow, 1977, ISBN 0-688-03197-8, ISBN 978-0-688-03197-8
- Power Precision: A Revolutionary Bridge System from a World Champion Player, Morrow, 1979 ISBN 0-688-03472-1, ISBN 978-0-688-03472-6
- Championship Bridge: One No Trump Forcing No. 20, Bibliagora, 1982, ISBN 0-906031-31-1, ISBN 978-0-906031-31-5
- Improve Your Bridge - Fast, Robert Hale Pub Co, 1982 (with Peter Steinberg), ISBN 0-7091-9892-2, ISBN 978-0-7091-9892-5
- The Viking Precision Club: A Relay System for the 21st Century, 2000 (with Glenn Grøtheim)
- The Bridge Bum: My Life and Play, 2nd Edition, Master Point Press, 2003, ISBN 1-894154-57-6, ISBN 978-1-894154-57-4
