= Billy Eisenberg =

American backgammon and bridge player (1937–2025)

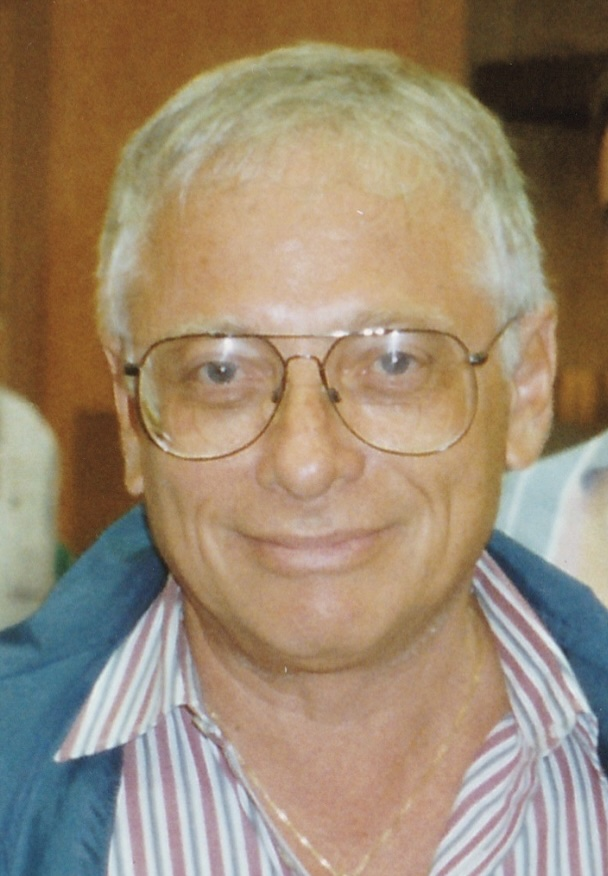

William Eisenberg (September 5, 1937 – July 13, 2025) was an American bridge and backgammon professional.

== Biography ==
Eisenberg was born on September 5, 1937.

In bridge, Eisenberg won five Bermuda Bowl world team titles and he won the backgammon world title in 1975. Eisenberg was World Bridge Federation (WBF) and American Contract Bridge League (ACBL) Grand Life Master. He lived in Boca Raton, Florida, as of 1994 and 1998.

Eisenberg was from New York City in 1968, when the Dallas businessman Ira Corn hired him as an original member of the first full-time professional bridge team, the Dallas Aces. He left the team and moved from Texas to California in 1971.

Eisenberg died on July 13, 2025, at the age of 87.

== Bridge accomplishments ==
=== Honors ===
- ACBL Hall of Fame, 1998

=== Wins ===
- Bermuda Bowl (5) 1970, 1971, 1976, 1977, 1979
- North American Bridge Championships (14)
  - Vanderbilt (2) 1971, 1978
  - Spingold (2) 1969, 1973
  - Reisinger (2) 1970, 1976
  - Grand National Teams (2) 1974, 1976
  - Men's Board-a-Match Teams (1) 1968
  - North American Swiss Teams (1) 2001
  - Senior Knockout Teams (3) 1995, 1996, 1999
  - Life Master Pairs (1) 1968
- United States Bridge Championships (7)
  - Open Team Trials (5) 1969, 1974, 1975, 1977, 1979 (Jan)
  - Senior Team Trials (2) 2005, 2008
- Other notable wins:
  - Cap Gemini Pandata World Top Invitational Pairs (1) 1991
  - Maccabiah Games (1) 1981

=== Runners-up ===
- Bermuda Bowl (1) 1975
- World Senior Teams (1) 1994
- North American Bridge Championships (15)
  - Vanderbilt (6) 1966, 1970, 1973, 1976, 1983, 1989
  - Spingold (2) 1970, 1999
  - Reisinger (3) 1968, 1981, 1983
  - Men's Board-a-Match Teams (1) 1969
  - Jacoby Open Swiss Teams (1) 1993
  - Senior Knockout Teams (1) 2001
  - Men's Pairs (1) 1981
- United States Bridge Championships (3)
  - Open Team Trials (1) 1973
  - Open Pair Trials (1) 1968
  - Senior Team Trials (1) 2001
- Other notable 2nd places:
  - Cavendish Invitational Teams (1) 1985
  - Cavendish Invitational Pairs (1) 1976

== Bibliography ==
- Kent Goulding, Backgammon with the Champions (Kensington, MD: KG Publications), volume 1, 1981 ; volume 2, 1982

Each volume covers Eisenberg in at least one match. "Series of annotated matches between good players. ... Commentary by Goulding, often in collaboration with Kit Woolsey." In particular, volume 1, number 1 was originally published as a booklet: "Paul Magriel vs. Billy Eisenberg: American Open Backgammon Championship, Las Vegas, Nevada, November 1979. Round 4, 15-point match (iv+42 pages)."
