= Bauke Muller =

Dutch bridge player living in Hoorn (born 1962)

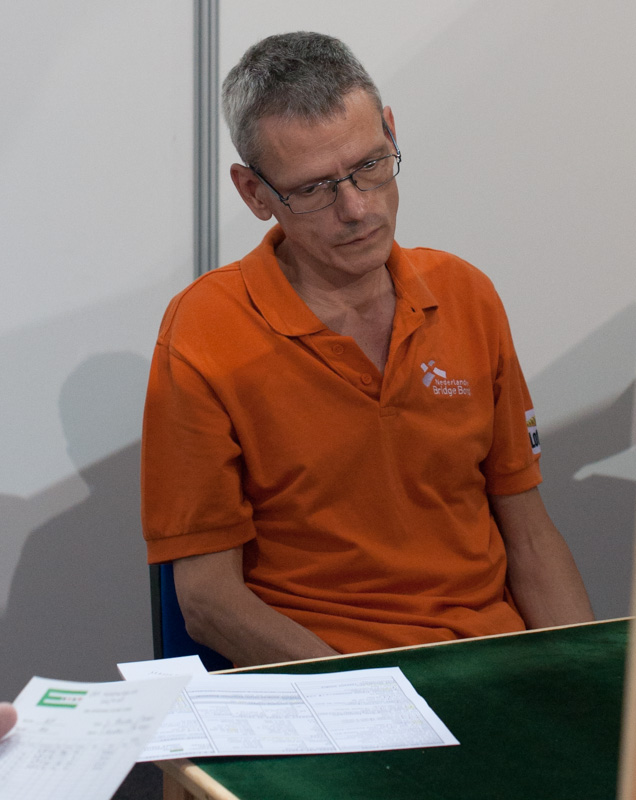
Bauke Muller (2014)

Bauke Muller (born 17 February 1962) is a Dutch bridge player living in Hoorn.

Muller was World Champion Open Teams (Bermuda Bowl) in 1993 and 2011 and European Champion Open Teams (Tenerife) in 2005. In 2007 he won the bronze medal at both the European Open Team Championships in Antalya and the World Open Teams Championships in Shanghai. He is nicknamed "the professor" because of his habit of very long pauses for thought.
