= Gabriel Chagas =

Brazilian bridge player

Gabriel Pinheiro Chagas Filho (born 7 December 1944 in Rio de Janeiro, Brazil) is a Brazilian bridge player. He was the winner of World Team Olympiad in Monte Carlo 1976, Bermuda Bowl in Perth 1989, World Open Pairs Championship in Geneva 1990, as well as Transnational Teams in Paris 2001. He is one of 10 players who achieved the Triple Crown of Bridge.

== Tournament record ==
=== Wins ===
- Bermuda Bowl (1) 1989
- World Open Team Olympiad (1) 1976
- World Open Pairs (1) 1990
- World Transnational Open Teams (1) 2001
- North American Bridge Championships (2)
  - Reisinger (1) 1992
  - Master Mixed Teams (1) 1992
- South American Championships (32)
  - Open Teams (28) 1967, 1968, 1969, 1970, 1972, 1973, 1974, 1975, 1977, 1978, 1982, 1983, 1984, 1986, 1987, 1989, 1990, 1991, 1993, 1996, 1997, 1998, 1999, 2000, 2002, 2006, 2007, 2008
  - Open Pairs (4) 1984, 1990, 1994, 2006
- Brazilian Championships (16)
  - Open Teams (14) 1967, 1968, 1969, 1971, 1981, 1983, 1984, 1987, 1992, 1993, 1997, 2000, 2003, 2008
  - Open Pairs (2) 1968, 1978
- Other notable wins:
  - IOC Grand Prix (1) 1998
  - Cap Gemini Pandata World Top Invitational Pairs (1) 1993
  - Cap Gemini World Top Invitational Pairs (1) 1997
  - Sunday Times Invitational Pairs (1) 1979
  - Sunday Times–Macallan Invitational Pairs (1) 1992

=== Runner-up ===
- Bermuda Bowl (1) 2000
- Rosenblum Cup (2) 1978, 1998
- South American Championships (6)
  - Open Teams (6) 1966, 1976, 1994, 1995, 2001, 2005
- Brazilian Championships (8)
  - Open Teams (5) 1990, 1996, 2002, 2005, 2006
  - Open Pairs (3) 1992, 1996, 2002
- Other notable 2nd places:
  - IOC Grand Prix (1) 1999
  - Cavendish Invitational Teams (1) 1996
  - Traditionalists vs. Scientists (1) 1990
  - Naturalists vs. Scientists (1) 1992
  - Staten Bank World Top Invitational Pairs (2) 1989, 1990
  - Sunday Times Invitational Pairs (1) 1978
  - Pan American Open Pairs (1) 1992

== Suspension ==
On 20 April 2021, the Federação Brasileira de Bridge (FBB) - the Brazilian Bridge Federation - sanctioned Chagas for cheating while playing bridge online. While few details were presented in the notice of suspension, it was noted that three incidents had been investigated and while Chagas deemed the conclusion unfair, he accepted the inevitable outcome of being found guilty and accepted the FBB's proposed sanctions.

Effective 15 April 2021, Chagas is

- suspended from participating in tournaments promoted by the Brazilian Bridge Federation and its associated clubs for a period of one year,
- is prevented from representing Brazil, nationally or internationally, for a period of one year and
- his titles and ranking points in online tournaments held from March 2020 onwards are revoked.
