= Eugenio Chiaradia =

Italian bridge player

Eugenio Chiaradia (1911–1977), nicknamed "Professor", was an Italian bridge player. A professor of philosophy, he was one of the early bridge theorists and the principal author of the Neapolitan Club system, the predecessor of the Blue Club. Chiaradia won six Bermuda Bowl titles (1957, 1958, 1959, 1961, 1962 and 1963) with the Blue Team, three of those in partnership with Guglielmo Siniscalco. He left the team after the 1963 Bermuda Bowl, and went to live in Sao Paulo, coaching the Brazilian team.

== Bridge accomplishments ==
=== Wins ===
- Bermuda Bowl (6) 1957, 1958, 1959, 1961, 1962, 1963

=== Runners-up ===
- Bermuda Bowl (1) 1951
