= Guglielmo Siniscalco =

Italian bridge player (1921–2020)

Guglielmo Siniscalco (21 July 1921 – 5 December 2020) was an Italian bridge player. Native of Naples, he was a civil engineer by vocation. He was six-times Italian champion (1948, 1949, 1951, 1956, 1957 and 1959). He won three Bermuda Bowl titles in 1957, 1958 and 1959 with the Blue Team. After the 1959 victory, he decided to withdraw from professional bridge to pursue an engineering career.

== Bridge accomplishments ==
=== Wins ===
- Bermuda Bowl (3) 1957, 1958, 1959

=== Runners-up ===
- Bermuda Bowl (1) 1951
