= United States Bridge Championships - Open =

Yearly competition

The United States Bridge Championships (USBC) is a yearly competition held to select either one or two teams that will represent the United States at international competition for the game of contract bridge. The general conditions of contest used by the United States Bridge Federation can be found here. There are multiple events in the USBC including Open, Women, Seniors, and Mixed divisions. This article contains information about the Open division in which anyone of any age or gender can compete.

== History and vocabulary ==
From May 17–21 of 1989, the "team trials" to determine which team would represent the United States was held in Memphis, TN. At that time, the trials had no name, and the name "United States Bridge Championship" was conceived by Matt Guagliardo, who was then the Director of Education for the ACBL, but was still actively involved in promoting bridge. Mr. Guagliardo, in collaboration with Barbara McBride, who was also the graphic artist for the ACBL, created the USBS logo, which was flag-shaped with a dark-blue square in the upper-left corner, with a white star, and a black spade inside the star. The words "United," "States," "and "Bridge" are in red, and are stacked vertically opposite the square. The word "Championship" is also in red, and is lengthwise below the blue square, and other verbiage. There is a blue line underneath the word "Championship," and a blue line extending from the right border of the square over the word "United."

T-shirts were printed and given to the caddies, who worked the sectional tournament that ran concurrently to the USBC, to wear. On the front, the T-shirts had the USBC logo, "Memphis, Tennessee" and "May 17–21, 1989." The back had printed in blue, in an arc shape, "A BIG DEAL FOR MEMPHIS," with four Aces printed below it, each with a different suit designation. The words and cards are all printed in blue.

Concurrent with the USBC was a sectional tournament, and the concluding event was a Swiss Teams, which was the norm then. In cooperation with the late Ralph Cohen, something was done, at least for the first time in the United States, and, quite probably, the world. This is what happened: The last round of the sectional Swiss Teams had "boards" ("hands') that were duplicated before the Swiss Teams began by Ralph and his small hand-picked group, and kept under ultra-tight security. Thus, in the last round of the "Swiss," at every table everyone was playing the same set of hands.

Immediately after the Swiss event ended, players adjourned to a large room, where, on Vu-Graph, they were able to see the same set of hands played live by contestants in the USBC. The showing of the hands was accompanied by expert commentary. Like the USBC itself, the concept of having the hands played by "ordinary" players in a competitive environment, then being able to see those same hands played by world-caliber experts was conceived by Matt Guagliardo.

The previous history was grossly inaccurate, and t-shirts autographed by players who competed in the 1989 event, and who are now deceased, give evidence that the term "United States Bridge Championship" was coined more than a decade before the formation of the United States Bridge Federation.

== Summary of past USBCs ==
Below is a table of teams that have won the Open USBCs and how they fared in international competition. In every odd number year, the winners of the USBC Open division get to compete in the Bermuda Bowl that has existed since 1950. The events in the even number years vary between the World Bridge Games and a Transnational Event. The USBF sends 2 teams to every Bermuda Bowl and 1 team to every World Bridge Games event.

2017 Open USBC
The 2017 Open USBC was held from April 28-May 10 in Schaumburg, Illinois. Nickell (Nick Nickell, Ralph Katz, Bobby Levin, Steve Weinstein, Jeff Meckstroth, and Eric Rodwell) team won the 120 board final against Diamond (John Diamond, Brain Platnick, Eric Greco, Geoff Hampson, Kevin Bathurst, and Justin Lall).

2016 Open USBC
The 2016 Open USBC was held to select the USA team for the 2016 World Bridge Games held in Wroclaw, Poland. This USBC was held in Denver Colorado from May 6 - May 15. The eventual champions were team Diamond (John Diamond, Brian Platnick, Eric Greco, Geoof Hampson, Kevin Bathurst, and Justin Lall) who would go on to place 5th-8th in Poland.

2015 Open USBC
The 2015 Open USBC was held in order to determine USA2 for the Chennai, India Bermuda Bowl. It was held from May 8 - May 17 in Schaumburg, Illinois. The eventual winner after the 10 days of competition was team Fireman (Paul Fireman, Gavin Wolpert, Vince Demuy, John Kranyak, John Hurd, and Joel Wooldridge). They would then go on to win the bronze medal in Chennai.

2014 Open USBC
The 2014 Open USBC was held in Phoenix, AZ from May 9 - May 18 in order to determine USA1 for Chennai. Nickell (Nick Nickell, Ralph Katz, Steve Weinstein, Bobby Levin, Jeff Meckstroth, and Eric Rodwell) beat Diamond (John Diamond, Brian Platnick, Eric Greco, Geoff Hampson, Kevin Bathurst, and Brad Moss) by 8 imps over 120 boards. Nickell rallied by a score of 43–8 in the final 15 boards to claim the victory.

2013 Open USBC
The 2013 Open USBC was held at Buena Vista Place in Orlando, Florida from June 1 - June 10. The purpose of these trials was to determine USA2 for the 2013 Bermuda Bowl. The eventual winners Fleisher (Marty Fleisher, Chris Willenken, Michael Rosenberg, Zia Mahmood, Chip Martel, and Michael Kamil) bested Nickell (Nick Nickell, Ralph Katz, Steve Weinstein, Bobby Levin, Eric Rodwell, and Jeff Meckstroth) 194–146.

2012 Open USBC
The 2012 Open USBC was held in Schaumburg, Illinois in order to qualify for the World Mind Sports Games in Lille, France. The tournament was held from April 27 - May 6. Team Nickell (Nick Nickell, Ralph Katz, Bob Hamman, Zia Mahmood, Jeff Meckstroth, and Eric Rodwell) beat Diamond (John Diamond, Brad Moss, Fred Gitelman, Geoff Hampson, and Brian Platnick) in the final.

2011 Open USBC
The 2011 USBC was held in Las Vegas, Nevada from May 10-May 17 in order to determine USA2 for the 2011 Bermuda Bowl. The winners would join team Fleisher who won in 2010. Team Bathurst (Kevin Bathurst, Dan Zagorin, Joe Grue, Justin Lall, Joel Wooldridge, and John Hurd) defeated Diamond (John Diamond, Eric Greco, Brad Moss, Brian Platnick, Geoff Hampson, and Fred Gitelman) 288–257.

2010 Open USBC
The 2010 USBC was held in Rosemont, Illinois from June 17- June 27 in order to determine USA1 for the 2011 Bermuda Bowl. Team Fleisher (Marty Fleisher, Michael Kamil, Chip Martel, Lew Stansby, Bobby Levin, and Steve Weinstein) defeated Diamond (John Diamond, Eric Greco, Brad Moss, Brian Platnick, Geoff Hampson, and Fred Gitelman) 260–218 to earn USA1 honors.

2009 Open USBC
The 2009 USBC was held in White Plains, New York from June 5 - June 15. Two teams would emerge from this USBC in order to represent the United States at the 2009 Bermuda Bowl in São Paulo. USA1 went to Robinson (Steve Robinson, Peter Boyd, Fred Stewart, Adam Wildavsky, Doug Doub, and Kit Woolsey) in their victory over Fleisher (Marty Fleisher, Russell Ekeblad, Ron Rubin, Michael Kamil, Peter Weichsel, and Matthew Granovetter). Fleisher then dropped into the USA2 finals. USA2 went to Nickell (Nick Nickell, Dick Freeman, Eric Rodwell, Jeff Meckstroth, Bob Hamman, and Zia Mahmood) when they beat Fleisher.

2007 Open USBC

2005 Open USBC

The 2005 Open USBC was held in order to select the second team that would represent the United States at the 2005 Bermuda Bowl in Estoril, Portugal. This year trials were held in Houston, Texas. This is the first year that Polish star Jacek Pszczoła or "Pepsi" is competing for the United States.

The eventual champions of the 2005 trials were Brad Moss, Ron Rubin, Eric Greco, Fred Gitelman, Geoff Hampson, Russ Ekeblad, Steve Landen NPC, Sheri Winestock Coach. They went on win the bronze medal in the Bermuda Bowl later that year.

2004 Open USBC
The Nickell team (Nick Nickell, Dick Freeman, Bob Hamman, Paul Soloway, Jeff Meckstroth, and Eric Rodwell) was the winner of this USBC and earned the right to play in the Estoril, Portugal Bermuda Bowl in 2005 as USA1. They would go on to win the Silver medal the following year. They defeated Welland (Roy Welland, Bjorn Fallenius, Zia Mahmood, and Michael Rosenberg) in what was a close match after 90 boards but Nickell gained 91 imps on the last 30 boards.

2003 Open USBC
The Cohen team (Steve Landen, Pratap Rajadhyaksha, Dan Morse, Robert Wolff, Doug Doub, Adam Wildavsky, Ralph Cohen NPC) defeated the Welland squad (Roy Welland, Bjorn Fallenius, Steve Garner, Howard Weinstein) in the final, 287-222. Cohen thereby earned the right to compete as USA2 in the Bermuda Bowl in Monte Carlo later that year, where they earned the Bronze medal.

2002 Open USBC
The Nickell team (Nick Nickell, Dick Freeman, Bob Hamman, Paul Soloway, Jeff Meckstroth, and Eric Rodwell) defeated Schwartz (Richard Schwartz, Michael Becker, Zia Mahmood, Michael Rosenberg, David Berkowitz, and Larry Cohen) to earn the right to compete in the 2003 Bermuda Bowl. Nickell led by just 7 imps going into the final segment, but was able to pull away to win by 29.

2001 Open USBC
The 2001 Open USBC was held in Memphis. The finals were between Nickell (Nick Nickell, Dick Freeman, Bob Hamman, Paul Soloway, Jeff Meckstroth, Eric Rodwell) and Ekeblad (Russ Ekeblad, Bob Lipsitz, Ron Rubin, Matt Granovetter, Mark Molson, and Barnett Shenkin). Nickell would go on to win the final.

== International placement of USBC winners ==
Year	International Event	Team	Place
2017	Bermuda Bowl: Lyon, France	Nick Nickell, Ralph Katz, Bobby Levin, Steve Weinstein, Jeff Meckstroth, Eric Rodwell, Jill Levin NPC, Coach Eric Kokish	5th-8th
2017	Bermuda Bowl: Lyon, France	Martin Fleisher, Joe Grue, Chip Martel, Brad Moss, Jacek Pszczoła, Michael Rosenberg, Jan Martel NPC	Gold
2016	World Bridge Games: Wroclaw, Poland	John Diamond, Brian Platnick, Eric Greco, Geoff Hampson, Kevin Bathurst, Justin Lall, Oren Kriegel NPC	9th-16th
2015	Bermuda Bowl: Chennai, India	Vincent Demuy, Paul Fireman, John Hurd, John Kranyak, Gavin Wolpert, Joel Woolridge, Shane Blanchard NPC	Bronze
2015	Bermuda Bowl: Chennai, India	Nick Nickell, Ralph Katz, Bobby Levin, Steve Weinstein, Jeff Meckstroth, Eric Rodwell, Donna Compton NPC, Eric Kokish Coach	5th-8th
2013	Bermuda Bowl: Bali, Indonesia	Kevin Bathurst, Kevin Dwyer, John Kranyak, Bobby Levin, Steve Weinstein, Gavin Wolpert, Shane Blanchard NPC	4th
2013	Bermuda Bowl: Bali, Indonesia	Martin Fleisher, Mike Kamil, Zia Mahmood, Chip Martel, Michael Rosenberg, Chris Willenken, Jan Martel NPC	Eliminated in Round Robin
2012	World Bridge Games: Lille, France	Nick Nickell, Ralph Katz, Jeff Meckstroth, Eric Rodwell, Bob Hamman, Zia Mahmood	5th-8th
2011	Bermuda Bowl: Veldhoven, Netherlands	Martin Fleisher, Mike Kamil, Lew Stansby, Chip Martel, Michael Rosenberg, Chris Willenken, Jan Martel NPC	4th
2011	Bermuda Bowl: Veldhoven, Netherlands	Kevin Bathurst, Joe Grue, John Hurd, Justin Lall, Joel Woolridge, Curtis Cheek NPC, Daniel Zagorin Coach	Silver
2009	Bermuda Bowl: São Paulo, Brazil	Peter Boyd, Doug Doub, Kit Woolsey, Adam Wildavsky, Steve Robinson, Fred Stewart, Howard Weinstein NPC	Eliminated in Round Robin
2009	Bermuda Bowl: São Paulo, Brazil	Jeff Meckstroth, Eric Rodwell, Nick Nickell, Bob Hamman, Ralph Katz, Zia Mahmood, Donna Compton NPC, Eric Kokish Coach	Gold
2008	World Bridge Games: Beijing, China	Nick Nickell, Richard Freeman, Jeff Meckstroth, Eric Rodwell, Chris Compton, Bob Hamman	9th-16th
2007	Bermuda Bowl: Shanghai, China	Zia Mahmood, Michael Rosenberg, Steve Garner, Howard Weinstein, George Jacobs, Ralph Katz, Jan Martel NPC, Chip Martel Coach	Silver
2007	Bermuda Bowl: Shanghai, China	Bob Hamman, Jeff Meckstroth, Eric Rodwell, Richard Freeman, Nick Nickell, Hemant Lall, Sidney Lazard NPC, Eric Kokish Coach	Eliminated in Round Robin
2005	Bermuda Bowl: Estoril, Portugal	Paul Soloway, Jeff Meckstroth, Nick Nickell, Bob Hamman, Richard Freeman, Sidney Lazard NPC, Eric Kokish Coach	Silver
2005	Bermuda Bowl: Estoril, Portugal	Brad Moss, Ron Rubin, Eric Greco, Fred Gitelman, Geoff Hampson, Russ Ekeblad, Steve Landen NPC, Sheri Winestock Coach	Bronze
2004	World Team Olympiad	Michael Rosenberg, Bobby Levin, Roy Welland, Steve Weinstein, Bjorn Fallenius, Zia Mahmood, Sheri Winestock NPC, Fred Gitelman Coach	9th-16th
2003	Bermuda Bowl: Monte Carlo	Paul Soloway, Jeff Meckstroth, Nick Nickell, Bob Hamman, Eric Rodwell, Richard Freeman, Sidney Lazard NPC	Gold
2003	Bermuda Bowl: Monte Carlo	Doug Doub, Steve Landen, Adam Wildavsky, Pratap Rajadhyaksha, Dan Morse, Bobby Wolff, Ralph Cohen NPC, Geoff Hampson Coach	Bronze
2001	Bermuda Bowl: Paris, France	Paul Soloway, Jeff Meckstroth, Nick Nickell, Bob Hamman, Eric Rodwell, Richard Freeman, Donald Krauss NPC	5th-8th
2001	Bermuda Bowl: Paris, France	Peter Weichsel, Chip Martel, Rose Meltzer, Kyle Larsen, Lew Stansby, Alan Sontag, Jan Martel NPC, Fred Gitelman Coach, Sheri Winestock Coach	Gold
