= Edgar Kaplan Blue Ribbon Pairs =

National bridge championship

The Edgar Kaplan Blue Ribbon Pairs (or simply the Blue Ribbon Pairs) is a national bridge championship held at the fall American Contract Bridge League (ACBL) North American Bridge Championship (NABC). The event is restricted to those that have won a blue ribbon qualification (usually by placing in the top two of an unrestricted regional event) and is generally considered, with the Norman Kay Platinum Pairs, as one of the two hardest pairs event on the ACBL calendar.

The Blue Ribbon Pairs is a six session MP pairs event, two qualifying sessions, two semi-final sessions and two final sessions that takes place over three days, typically starting on the first Tuesday of the NABC.

Along with the Von Zedtwitz Life Master Pairs at the summer NABC and the Norman Kay Platinum Pairs at the spring NABC, the events provide one marquee pairs championship at each of the three NABCs. Each is open to all players whose past performances qualify them, without regard to age, gender, nationality, or ACBL membership. In addition, the North American Pairs, contested in the spring, is for ACBL members who have qualified in one of its 25 Districts, some of which require qualification in local Units.

== History ==
The event was introduced in 1963 and ranks with the von Zedtwitz Life Master Pairs (Summer NABC) as the most prestigious—and toughest—pair events on the ACBL calendar.

Entry is restricted to winners and runners-up in regional championships—plus high finishers in North American championships, members of current Grand National district championship teams, members of current official teams representing ACBL and the top 100 lifetime masterpoint holders.

The Blue Ribbon Pairs was renamed the Edgar Kaplan Blue Ribbon Pairs in 1999 to honor one of bridge's all-time great players, writers and administrators. Edgar Kaplan was recognized as the world’s foremost authority on the laws of duplicate and rubber bridge. He became co-chairman of the ACBL Laws Commission in 1978 and was co-chairman of the WBF Laws Commission at the time of his death. He was named ACBL Honorary Member in 1993. In 1995 he was inducted into the ACBL Bridge Hall of Fame and the WBF Hall of Fame.

The event is contested for the Cavendish Trophy, which was donated by the Cavendish Club of New York in 1928 and long awarded for the National Open Pairs. Since 1963, the trophy has been awarded to winners of the Blue Ribbon Pairs.

== Winners ==
No Blue Ribbon Pairs champion has successfully defended their title. Jeff Meckstroth and Eric Rodwell have won three times as a pair; two other pairs have won twice: Steve Robinson–Kit Woolsey and Marty Bergen–Larry N. Cohen. Bob Hamman won four times with four partners over thirty years from 1964 to 1993; Cohen (twice), Rodwell (once) and Woolsey (once) won additional titles with other partners. They and Meckstroth are the only players with three or more wins. Joe Grue has also won 3 times, each time with a different partner.

Kathie and Mike Cappelletti were runners-up in 1973 and 1977. A married couple last won the predecessor Fall National Open Pairs in 1945, Jane and Lewis M. Jaeger (the first married couple who became Life Masters).

Two women, Daniela von Arnim and Sabine Auken were runners-up in 2005—the last time there was one woman in the winning pair, Jenny Ryman and Gavin Wolpert (who later married). Two women won the predecessor Open Pairs in 1948, Helen Sobel and Margaret Wagar—also the last time any pair defended its title.

Blue Ribbon Pairs, 1963 to present
Year	Winners	Runners-up
-1962	preceded by the Fall National Open Pairs	
1963	B. Jay Becker, Dorothy Hayden	Harold Harkavy, Cliff Russell
1964	Bob Hamman, Lew Mathe	Gunther Polak, Robert G. Sharp
1965	Chuck Henke, John H. Moran	Mike Lawrence, Ron Von der Porten
1966	Charles Coon, Richard Zeckhauser	Leland Ferer, Gratian Goldstein
1967	Sami Kehela, Baron Wolf Lebovic	Phil Feldesman, Lew Mathe
1968	Larry T. Cohen, Richard H. Katz	Bobby Goldman, Mike Lawrence
1969	Erik Paulsen, Alex Tschekaloff	2/4: Sami Kehela, Eric Murray; 2/4: Tom Hodapp, Robert Morris; 2/4: Larry T. Cohen, Richard H. Katz
1970	Chuck Burger, Ira Rubin	Richard Freeman, Cliff Russell
1971	Roger Bates, John M. Grantham	Hermine Baron, Mike Lawrence
1972	Richard Khautin, Warren Kornfeld	Garey Hayden, Mark Lair
1973	Steve Robinson, Kit Woolsey	Kathie Cappelletti, Mike Cappelletti
1974	Edgar Kaplan, Norman Kay	Roger Bates, George Rosenkranz
1975	Steve Robinson, Kit Woolsey	Ron Andersen, Hugh MacLean
1976	Jay Apfelbaum, Bill Edelstein	Jim Jacoby, David Berkowitz
1977	Lou Bluhm, Tommy Sanders	Kathie Cappelletti, Mike Cappelletti
1978	Ron Andersen, David Berkowitz	Ted Horning, Peter Nagy
1979	Bobby Levin, Ron Smith	James Bennett, Chet Davis
1980	Warren Rosner, Allan Stauber	Dan Morse, Bobby Nail
1981	Larry N. Cohen, Ron Gerard	Chip Martel, Lew Stansby
1982	Jeff Meckstroth, Eric Rodwell	2/3: Bob Blanchard, Drew Casen; 2/3: Peter Boyd, Steve Robinson
1983	Marty Bergen, Larry N. Cohen	Peter Weichsel, Mike Lawrence
1984	1/2: Jack Kennedy, Bobby Wolff; 1/2: David Funk, Mark Lair	
1985	Walter Johnson, Eric Rodwell	Ed Manfield, Kit Woolsey
1986	Bob Hamman, Ron Von der Porten	Ed Manfield, Kit Woolsey
1987	Fred Stewart, Steve Weinstein	Bobby Levin, Kerri Shuman
1988	Marty Bergen, Larry N. Cohen	Bobby Levin, Ron Smith
1989	Mark Molson, Robert Lebi	Gaylor Kasle, Roger Bates
1990	Ed Manfield, Kit Woolsey	Brian Glubok, Sam Lev
1991	Bob Hamman, Nick Nickell	Mark Tolliver, Marc Zwerling
1992	Haig Tchamitch, Adam Wildavsky	Brad Moss, Ravindra Murthy
1993	Bob Hamman, Michael Rosenberg	Martin De Bruin, Steve Price
1994	Mark Lair, Alexander Weiland	Fred Stewart, Steve Weinstein
1995	David Berkowitz, Larry N. Cohen	Paul Kiefer, Jerry Helms
1996	Bob Blanchard, Jim Krekorian	David Berkowitz, Larry N. Cohen
1997	Allan Falk, Adam Wildavsky	Tony Forrester, Geir Helgemo
1998	Zia Mahmood, Howard Weinstein	Eric Rodwell, Marty Seligman
1999	Jill Meyers, John Mohan	Russ Ekeblad, John Sutherlin
2000	Richard Coren, Marc Jacobus	Bobby Levin, Steve Weinstein
2001	Salvador Assael, Nafiz Zorlu	Pratap Rajadhyaksha, Steve Landen
2002	Bart Bramley, Sidney Lazard	Fred Stewart, Kit Woolsey
2003	Geir Helgemo, Michael Seamon	Eric Greco, Geoff Hampson
2004	Tarek Sadek, Waleed El Ahmady	Bobby Levin, Steve Weinstein
2005	Jenny Ryman, Gavin Wolpert	Daniela von Arnim, Sabine Auken
2006	Fulvio Fantoni, Claudio Nunes	Drew Casen, Jim Krekorian
2007	Steve Landen, Pratap Rajadhyaksha	Ernesto Muzzio, Alejandro Bianchedi
2008	Jeff Meckstroth, Eric Rodwell	Martin de Knijff, Frederic Wrang
2009	Bart Bramley, Björn Fallenius	John Hurd, Joel Wooldridge
2010	Jay Borker, Jan Jansma	Sjoert Brink, Bas Drijver
2011	Joshua Donn, Roger Lee	Billy Cohen, Brad Moss
2012	John Diamond, Brian Platnick	Geoff Hampson, Eric Greco
2013	Agustin Madala, Steve Weinstein	Bar Tarnovski, Dror Padon
2014	John Hurd, Justin Lall	Nikolay Demirev, Eldad Ginossar
2015	Joe Grue, John Hurd	Thomas Bessis, Frederic Volcker
2016	Jeff Meckstroth, Eric Rodwell	Billy Cohen, Ron Smith
2017	Joe Grue, Eric Greco	Sylvia Shi, Matt Granovetter
2018	Joe Grue, Robert Levin	Eldad Ginossar, Chris Compton
2019	Roger Lee, Wei Wang	Richard Pavlicek, Jim Munday
2021	Cedric Lorenzini, Thomas Bessis	Ami Zamir, Oren Toledano
2022	Jacek Kalita, Michal Klukowski	Jim Munday, Richard Pavlicek
2023	Aldo Gerli, Andrea Boldrini	Tom Townsend, Ben Handley-Pritchard
2024	Simon Cope, Thomas Paske	Weizhong Bao, Hailong Ao
2025	Jerome Rombaut, Leo Rombaut	Iftikhar Baqai, Mitch Dunitz

== See also ==
- Fall National Open Pairs, predecessor 1928 to 1962
- Von Zedtwitz Life Master Pairs, or simply Life Master Pairs
- Norman Kay Platinum Pairs, or Platinum Pairs

== Sources ==
- Pre-2008 winners:Daily Bulletin (PDF), vol. 81–5, November 25, 2008, p. 8, archived from the original (PDF) on December 3, 2008
- 2008 winners Daily Bulletin (PDF), vol. 81–8, November 28, 2008, p. 1, archived from the original (PDF) on December 16, 2014
- Qualification rules: ACBL web site (PDF), archived from the original (PDF) on 2015-04-07
- The ACBL official website: go to the 'Tournaments' tab, then the 'NABC Winners' tab; select a "Fall" and/or "[Year]" NABC. Look for 'Kaplan Blue Ribbon Pairs' under the 'Event' column. Retrieved 2015-11-16.
