= Terence Reese bibliography =

John Terence Reese (28 August 1913 – 29 January 1996) was a British bridge player and writer. Regarded as one of the finest players, he was also one of the most influential and acerbic of bridge writers, with a large output, including several books which remain in print as classics of bridge play. He was also the long-time bridge correspondent of The Lady, The Observer, the London Evening News and the Evening Standard.

Co-author(s)	Title	Editions and Printings	Notes
Phillips, Hubert	The Elements of Contract	1937: British Bridge World (London), 271p.; 1948: Eyre & Spottiswoode (London)	Hubert Phillips acknowledges that although the book is published jointly under their names, "Terence is the real author of the book", receiving only assistance in planning contents and in revising text from Phillips.
Cohen, Ben	The Acol Two Club. Second and subsequent editions titled The Acol System of Contract Bridge	1938: Sheffield, 1938, 55p.; 1939: Joiner & Steele (London), 64p.; 1946: Joiner & Steele (London), 84p.; 1949: Joiner & Steele (London), 127p.; 1956: Joiner & Steele (London), 148p	First and second editions carry the introduction by S.J. Simon - Attitude of Mind; Third edition completely revised, with a new introduction by S.J. Simon and 12 selected hands from Waddington's Par Contests composed by Terence Reese and S. J. Simon: Contract Bridge Equipment Ltd. (Leeds, England) in association with Joiner & Steele; Fourth edition with S.J. Simon's introduction to the third edition. Completely revised (with three new chapters and an appendix illustrating the system at work in the International Series of 1949); Fifth edition with Introduction by Guy Ramsey and a selection of hands from the 1955–56 international events
Phillips, Hubert	How to Play Bridge	1945: Penguin, 128p.; 1958: Revised edition, Max Parrish (London), 152p.	
	Reese on Play: An Introduction to Good Bridge	1947: Longmans, Green & Co. (New York), 232p.; 1947: Edward Arnold (Publishers) Ltd. (London), 232p. Numerous reprints.; 1976, 1978: W.H. Allen (London), 195p., ISBN 978-0-491-01655-1, ISBN 978-0-491-02477-8; 1982: Methuen (London), 195p., ISBN 978-0-413-50930-7; 1983: Devyn Press (Louisville, KY), ISBN 978-0-910791-11-3; 2001, 2006: Chess & Bridge Ltd. (London), 185p., ISBN 978-0-9530218-2-6	Ranked number 10 by Experts responding to the 2007 American Contract Bridge League (ACBL) survey on their top ten favourite bridge books.
Phillips, Hubert	Bridge at Ruff's Club	1951: The Batchworth Press, 248p. Edited by Terence Reese.	The book consists of articles previously written by Phillips and published in The Lady and The Sunday News of India. As editor, Reese made "expert" revisions to the collection of articles.; In the first paragraph of the book's Foreword, Phillips acknowledges Reese "... with whom I have had the pleasure of collaborating for something like the last eighteen years." The Foreword is dated March 1951.
	Modern Bidding and the Acol System	1952, 1960: Nicholson & Watson (London), 128p.	
Phillips, Hubert	Bridge with Mr. Playbetter	1952: The Batchworth Press, 221p	A 32-page pamphlet containing reprints of the hands in the text was inserted in a pocket on the inside back cover of the book to "enable the reader to follow the play of each hand without having to keep turning over the page."
Franklin, Harold	World Bridge Championship	1955: De La Rue (London), 106p.	One hundred selected hands from the match of 224 hands, Great Britain (representing Europe) vs. United States (the holders), played at the Beekman Hotel, New York, January 9 to 14, 1955
	The Expert Game	1958, 1959, 1962: Edward Arnold (Publishers) Ltd. (London), 190p.; 1960: Published in the USA as Master Play. George Coffin (Waltham MA), 144p. and in 1966 by Simon & Schuster, Cornerstone Library (New York), 139p.; 1973, 1974: Hale (London), 190p., ISBN 978-0-7091-3941-6.; 1974: Published in the USA as Master Play in Contract Bridge . Dover Publications (New York), ISBN 978-0-486-20336-2, 143p.; 1984, 1991: Second edition, Hale (London), 190p., ISBN 978-0-7090-1440-9.; 1997: Revised and enlarged third edition with Barry Rigal, Hale (London), 208p., ISBN 978-0-7090-5939-4.	Ranked number 1 by Experts responding to the 2007 American Contract Bridge League (ACBL) survey on their top ten favourite bridge books. In the preface to the 1984 Hale printing, Reese indicated that he took exception to the changes in spelling, idiom and vocabulary introduced in the Coffin printings.
Dormer, Albert	Bridge Player's Dictionary	1959: Sterling Publishing Co. (New York), 252p.; 1959: Oak Tree (London), 252p. with 8p. Addendum inserted; 1959: Barnes & Noble (New York), 252p; 1959, 1960: Mayflower; 1960: Sterling Publishing Co. (New York), 252p.; 1963: Revised edition: Sterling Publishing Co. (New York), 252p.	The 1959 Barnes & Noble publication was under the title Bridge Player's Dictionary and Quick-reference Guide
	Play Bridge with Reese	1960: Oak Tree (London), 252p.; 1960: Mayflower (London), 252p.; 1960: Sterling Publishing Co. (New York), 252p.; 1960, 1962: Nobles & Barnes (New York), 252p.; 1969: Dover Publications (New York), 252p., ISBN 978-0-486-22313-1; 2002: Chess & Bridge (London), 240p., ISBN 978-0-9530218-5-7	
	Master Play (also titled Master Play in Contract Bridge)	1960: George Coffin Publisher (Massachusetts); 1974: Published as Master Play in Contract Bridge by Dover Publications (New York), 143p., ISBN 978-0-486-20336-2	
	Bridge	1961, 1968, 1982: Penguin Books (Baltimore, Harmondsworth), 207p., ISBN 978-0-14-046065-0	
Albarran, Pierre and Jaïs, Pierre	How to Win at Rubber Bridge	"[Albarran and Jaïs] Adapted for English readers by Terence Reese." OCLC 4381041: 1961: Barrie and Rockliff (London), 191p	
Dormer, Albert	Blueprint for Bidding; the Acol System Applied to American Bridge	1961: Sterling Publishing Co. (New York), 163p., OCLC 1355341	
Dormer, Albert	The Acol System Today	1961: Edward Arnold (Publishers) Ltd. (London), 163p.; 1978: Second edition revised as Bridge: the Acol System of Bidding, Pan (London), 156p., ISBN 978-0-330-25540-0; 1979: Robert Hale (London), 156p., ISBN 978-0-7091-7382-3	
	Learn Bridge with Reese	1962, 1987: Faber and Faber (London, Boston), 164p.; revised: 1987, 162p., ISBN 978-0-571-13970-5; 1978: Revised. Hamlyn (Feltham), 164p., ISBN 978-0-600-31514-8	
	Develop Your Bidding Judgment	1962: Oak Tree Press (London), 254p.; 1964, 1967: Cornerstone Library (New York), 192p.	Published by Dover as Bidding a Bridge Hand in 1972
	The Game of Bridge	1962: Constable, 208p.; 2002, 2003: Chess & Bridge (London), 164p., ISBN 978-0-9530218-6-4	
Culbertson, Ely	Culberton's Complete Summary of Contract Bridge: bidding, leads and plays	1963: Faber and Faber (London), 64p.	Completely revised by Terence Reese, this is the first edition of the Culbertson's Summary series published since 1954 - Culbertson died in 1955.
	Bridge for Bright Beginners	1964: Sterling Publishing Co. (New York), 151p.; 1964: Dover Publications (New York), 151p.; 1965: Oak Tree Press (London), 151p.; 1968, 1969: Cornerstone Library (New York), 144p.; 1973: Dover Publications (New York), 151p., ISBN 978-0-486-22942-3	
	Bridge Conventions, Finesses, and Coups	1965: Sterling Publishing Co., (New York), 192p.; 1965, 1967: Cornertone Library (New York), 192p.; 1970: Dover Publications (New York), 192p., ISBN 978-0-486-22631-6	
Franklin, Harold	Best of Bridge on the Air: the Listener Book of Bridge	1965: BBC (London)	Problems and questions distilled from over 200 radio programmes; the hands were later discussed in The Listener
	Story of an Accusation	1966: Heinemann (London), 244p.; 1967: Simon and Schuster (New York), 246p.; 2004: Revised edition: Chess & Bridge (London), 232p.; 2004: Better Bridge Now (London), 240p., ISBN 978-0-9530218-8-8	
Dormer, Albert	The Play of the Cards	1967: Penguin Books (Baltimore), 270p., 1977: New edition: Hale (London), 224p., ISBN 978-0-7091-5873-8; 1979: New edition: Sphere (London), 224p., ISBN 978-0-7221-7255-1; 1991: Revised edition: Hale (London), 224p., ISBN 0-7090-4341-4 (ISBN 978-0-7090-4341-6)	The 1991 edition is a paperback reprint of the second edition of 1977 (a hardback). According to the 1991 Forward, "The natural (reading) successors to this work are Reese on Play and The Expert Game, both published by Robert Hale."
Dormer, Albert	Bridge for Tournament Players	1968, 1969, 1971: Robert Hale & Company (London), 173p., ISBN 978-0-7091-0003-4	
Dormer, Albert	How to Play a Good Game of Bridge	1969: William Heinemann Ltd. (London), 181p.	
Garozzo, Benito and Yallouze, Léon	The Blue Club	1969: Faber and Faber (London), 170p., ISBN 978-0-571-09265-9	Written by Garozzo and Yallouze and first published under the title Bridge de Competition; adapted by Terence Reese with Introduction by Omar Sharif.
Schapiro, Boris	Bridge Card by Card	1969, 1971: Hamlyn (London, Toronto, New York), 86p., ISBN 978-0-600-00357-1	
	C.C. Wei's Precision System	197?: printed in Taiwan, 98p. OCLC 2556706	
	Bidding a Bridge Hand	1972: Dover Publications (New York), 254p., ISBN 978-0-486-22830-3.	Previously published as Develop Your Bidding Judgement (1962)
	Precision Bidding and Precision Play	1972: W.H. Allen (London, New York), 153p., ISBN 978-0-491-00544-9; 1973: Sterling Publishing Co. (New York), 153p., ISBN 978-0-8069-4924-6, ISBN 978-0-8069-4925-3; 1974: Star Books (London),153p., ISBN 978-0-352-30013-3; 1974, 1975, 1981: Cornerstone Library (New York), 153p., 154p., ISBN 978-0-346-12501-8; 1980, 1988?, : R. Hale (London), 150p., 153p., ISBN 978-0-7091-8295-5, ?ISBN 978-0-7090-3221-2	
	Practical Bidding and Practical Play	1973-1974: W.H. Allen (London), 292p., ISBN 978-0-491-01401-4; 1974: 292p., ISBN 978-0-352-30044-7; 1973: Sterling Publishing Co., 292p.; 1974: Star Brooks (London), 292p., ISBN 978-0-352-30038-6	
	Advanced Bridge	1973: Sterling Publishing Co. (New York), 464p., ISBN 978-0-8069-4922-2	A consolidation of Play Bridge with Reese and Develop Your Bidding Judgement into one book.
Dormer, Albert	The Complete Book of Bridge	1973: Faber and Faber (London, Boston), 485p., ISBN 978-0-571-09904-7; 1973: Excalibur Books (New York), 485p., ISBN 978-0-525-70006-7; 1974: Saturday Review Press (New York), 485p., ISBN 978-0-8415-0277-2; 1980: Coles (Toronto), 485p.; 1985: Revised edition: Faber and Faber (London, Boston), 469p., ISBN 978-0-571-13528-8	
	Play These Hands with Me	1976: W.H. Allen (London), 1976 and 1978, 195p., ISBN 978-0-491-01655-1, ISBN 978-0-491-02477-8; 1982: Methuen (London), 195p., ISBN 978-0-413-50930-7; 1983: Devyn Press (Louisville KY), ISBN 978-0-910791-11-3; 2001: Chess & Bridge (London), 202p., ISBN 978-0-9530218-2-6	
	Bridge by Question and Answer	1976: Barker (London), 158p., ISBN 978-0-213-16583-3; 1978: Keys Books (Toronto), 200p., ISBN 978-0-7740-2508-9	
Trézel, Roger	Snares and Swindles in Bridge	1976: Frederick Fell Publishers (New York), Master Bridge Series, 64p., ISBN 978-0-88391-071-9; 1976: Ward Lock (London), 64p., ISBN 978-0-7063-5310-5; 1979, 1986: Victor Gollancz (London) in association with Peter Crawley, 64p., ISBN 978-0-575-02633-9	
Trézel, Roger	Blocking and Unblocking Plays in Bridge	1976: Frederick Fell Publishers (New York), Master Bridge Series, 64p., ISBN 978-0-88391-084-9; 1976: Ward Lock (London), 64p., ISBN 978-0-7063-5189-7, ISBN 978-0-7063-5191-0; 1976, 1979: Victor Gollancz (London) in association with Peter Crawley, 64p., ISBN 978-0-575-02749-7	
Trézel, Roger	Safety Plays in Bridge	1976: Frederick Fell Publishers (New York), Master Bridge Series, 63p., ISBN 978-0-88391-083-2; 1976: Ward Lock (London), 63p., ISBN 978-0-7063-5084-5, ISBN 978-0-7063-5200-9; 1976, 1990: Victor Gollancz (London) in association with Peter Crawley, 63p., ISBN 978-0-575-02631-5, ISBN 978-0-575-02748-0	
Trézel, Roger	Elimination Play in Bridge	1976: Frederick Fell Publishers (New York), Master Bridge Series, 77p., ISBN 978-0-88391-070-2; 1976: Ward Lock (London), 77p., ISBN 978-0-7063-5323-5; 1979, 1986: Victor Gollancz (London) in association with Peter Crawley, 77p., ISBN 978-0-575-02632-2	
	Bridge at the Top	1977: Faber & Faber (London), 143p., ISBN 978-0-571-11123-7	
	Begin Bridge With Reese	1977: Sterling Publishing Co. (New York), 128p., ISBN 978-0-8069-4932-1, ISBN 978-0-8069-4933-8; 1978: Bodley Head (London), 133p., ISBN 978-0-370-30102-0; 1979: New American Library (New York), 130p.; 1981: Penguin (Harmondsworth), 128p., ISBN 978-0-14-046392-7	
	Stallard's "First up": a revolution in bridge bidding	1978: Berl & Stallard (Miles City, MT), 73p	
	The Most Puzzling Situations in Bridge Play	1978: Sterling (New York), 160p., ISBN 978-0-8069-4936-9, ISBN 978-0-8069-4937-6; 1979: Allen and Unwin (London), 160p., ISBN 978-0-04-793039-3; 1980: New York Library (New York), 160p., ISBN 978-0-451-09538-1	
Trézel, Roger	Those Extra Chances in Bridge	1978: Frederick Fell Publishers (New York), 64p., ISBN 978-0-88391-077-1; 1978: Ward Lock (London), 64p., ISBN 978-0-7063-5610-6; 1978, 1986: Victor Gollancz (London) in association with Peter Crawley, 64p., ISBN 978-0-575-02634-6	
Trézel, Roger	When to Duck When to Win in Bridge	1978: Frederick Fell Publishers (New York), 64p., ISBN 978-0-88391-078-8; 1978: Ward Lock (London), 64p., ISBN 978-0-7063-5612-0; 1978, 1988: Victor Gollancz (London) in association with Peter Crawley, 64p., ISBN 978-0-575-02635-3	
Flint, Jeremy	Trick 13	1979: Weidenfeld and Nicolson (London), 172p., ISBN 978-0-297-77582-9; 1980: Bibliagora (London), 172p., ISBN 978-0-906031-04-9	A novel.
Trézel, Roger	The Art of Defence in Bridge	1979: Frederick Fell Publishers (New York), Master Bridge Series, 79p., ISBN 978-0-88391-093-1; 1979, 1988: Victor Gollancz (London) in association with Peter Crawley, 79p., ISBN 978-0-575-02598-1	
Trézel, Roger	Master the Odds in Bridge	1979, 1986: Victor Gollancz (London) in association with Peter Crawley, Master Bridge Series, 79p., ISBN 978-0-575-02597-4; 1979: F. Fell (New York), 79p., ISBN 978-0-88391-094-8	
	Bridge	1980, 1983, 1988 (7th impression), 1989 (8th impression), 1990: Hodder and Stoughton: Teach Yourself Books (Sevenoaks), 136-176p., ISBN 978-0-340-24884-3, ISBN 0-340-32438-4 (ISBN 978-0-340-32438-7)	
	Bridge Tips by World Masters: Terence Reese develops and enlarges the famous Bols bridge tips	1980, 1987: R. Hale (London), 174p., ISBN 978-0-7091-8127-9, ISBN 978-0-7090-2908-3	
Jourdain, Patrick	Squeeze Play is Easy	1980: George Allen & Unwin (london), 145p., ISBN 0-04-793047-0; Published in the USA as Squeeze Play Made Easy, Sterling Publishing Co. Inc. (New York), 145p., ISBN 0-8069-4940-6	
	Bridge Tips from the Masters	1981: Crown Publishers (New York), 236p., ISBN 978-0-517-54464-8	
Dormer, Albert	The Bridge Player's Alphabetical Handbook	1981: Faber and Faber (London, Boston), 223p., ISBN 978-0-571-11599-0	
Kantar, Edwin	Defend with Your Life	1981: Faber and Faber (London, Boston), 160p., ISBN 978-0-571-11711-6; 1981: Squeeze Books (Poughkeepsie, N.Y.), 151p., ISBN 978-1-58776-146-1	
Bird, David	Miracles of Card Play	1982, 1984, 1989, 1991, and 1998: Victor Gollancz (London) in association with Peter Crawley, Master Bridge Series, 160p., ISBN 978-0-575-03079-4, ISBN 978-0-575-04505-7, ISBN 978-0-575-06594-9; 2008: Weidenfeld & Nicolson (London), 160p., ISBN 978-0-297-84494-5	
Bird, David	Bridge, the Modern Game	1983, 1985: Faber and Faber (London, Boston), 200p., ISBN 978-0-571-13053-5, ISBN 978-0-571-13097-9; 1998: Second edition: Robert Hale (London), 198p., ISBN 978-0-7090-6179-3	
Bird, David	Unholy Tricks: More Miraculous Card Play	1984, 1988, 1995: Victor Gollancz (London) in association with Peter Crawley, Master Bridge Series, 160p., ISBN 978-0-575-03493-8, ISBN 978-0-575-04263-6, ISBN 978-0-575-05944-3; 2007: Weidenfeld & Nicolson (London), 160p., ISBN 978-0-297-85350-3	
Trézel, Roger	The Mistakes You Make at Bridge	1984, 1989: Victor Gollancz (London) in association with Peter Crawley, Master Bridge Series, 168p., ISBN 978-0-575-03424-2, ISBN 978-0-575-03409-9; 1992: Reprint: Houghton Mifflin (Boston) in association with Peter Crawley, ISBN 978-0-395-62891-1; 1994: New Edition: Gollancz (London), 168p., ISBN 978-0-575-05785-2; 2006: Revised edition by Ron Klinger: Cassell (London) in association with Peter Crawley, 160p., ISBN 978-0-304-36811-2	
Bird, David	How the Experts Do It: Improving Your Bridge	1985: Faber and Faber (London, Boston), 215p., ISBN 978-0-571-13463-2, ISBN 978-0-571-13464-9	
Hoffman, Martin	Play it Again Sam	1985: Faber and Faber (London), 350p., ISBN 978-0-571-13685-8, ISBN 978-0-571-13686-5; 1986: Devyn Press (Louisville, KY), 158p., ISBN 978-0-910791-21-2	
Pottage, Julian	Positive Defence	1985: Victor Gollancz (London) in association with Peter Crawley, Master Bridge Series, 128p., ISBN 978-0-575-03562-1 ISBN 978-0-575-03612-3; 2005: Positive Defence at Bridge, Master Point Press (Toronto), 160p., ISBN 978-1-894154-93-2	
	What Would You Bid?	1986: Faber & Faber (London, Boston), 160p., ISBN 978-0-571-14596-6	
Pottage, Julian	Positive Declarer's Play	1986: Victor Gollancz (London) in association with Peter Crawley, Master Bridge Series, 128p., ISBN 978-0-575-03839-4, ISBN 978-0-575-03838-7; 2005: Positive Declarer's Play at Bridge, Master Point Press (Toronto), 152p., ISBN 978-1-894154-94-9	
Bird, David	Doubled And Venerable, Further Miracles of Card Play	1987: Victor Gollancz (London) in association with Peter Crawley, Master Bridge Series, 160p., ISBN 978-0-575-03960-5; 1992, 1998: Victor Gollancz (London) in association with Peter Crawley, Master Bridge Series, 184p., ISBN 978-0-575-06684-7	
English Bridge Union Teachers' Association	Master Plays in a Single Suit	1987: Victor Gollancz (London) in association with Peter Crawley, 10p., ISBN 978-0-575-04132-5	
	Bridge for Ambitious Players	1988: Victor Gollancz (London) in association with Peter Crawley (London), Master Bridge Series, 143p., ISBN 978-0-575-04176-9	
Bird, David	The Hidden Side of Bridge	1988: Faber and Faber (London), 136p., ISBN 978-0-571-14910-0, ISBN 978-0-571-14935-3; 1996: Batsford (London), 136p., ISBN 978-0-7134-7931-7	
	Master Deceptive Plays	1989: Victor Gollancz (London) in association with Peter Crawley, 14p., ISBN 978-0-575-04384-8	
Beguin, P. and Besse, Jean	Do You Really Want to Win at Bridge?	1989: Victor Gollancz (London) in association with Peter Crawley, 144p., ISBN 978-0-575-04404-3	
Bird, David	Tricks of the Trade	1989, 1991: Victor Gollancz (London) in association with Peter Crawley, Master Bridge Series, 144p., ISBN 978-0-575-04504-0, ISBN 978-0-575-05024-2	
Markus, Rixi	Better Bridge for Club Players	1989: Victor Gollancz (London) in association with Peter Crawley, Master Bridge Series, 125p., ISBN 978-0-575-04526-2	
Bird, David	Acol in the 90's	1990: Robert Hale Ltd. (London), 153p., ISBN 978-0-7090-4143-6; 1994: Robert Hale Ltd. (London), 157p., ISBN 978-0-7090-5379-8	
Le Dentu, José	Bridge: Triumphs and Disasters	1990: Master Bridge Series, 3p., ISBN 978-0-575-04806-5	
	Brilliancies and Blunders in the European Bridge Championship	1991: Maxwell Macmillan Bridge (Wheatley, Oxford), 136p., ISBN 978-1-85744-500-8	
Bird, David	Famous Hands from Famous Matches	1991: Maxwell Macmillan Bridge (Oxford), Macmillan Publishing Co., (New York), 156p., ISBN 978-1-85744-501-5, ISBN 978-0-08-041285-6	
Bird, David	Cardinal Sins	1991: Victor Gollancz (London) in association with Peter Crawley, Master Bridge Series, 128p., ISBN 978-0-575-04997-0; 1996, Victor Gollancz (London) in association with Peter Crawley, Master Bridge Series, 156p., ISBN 978-0-575-06294-8	
Flint, Jeremy	Bridge with the Professional Touch	1991: Victor Gollancz (London) in association with Peter Crawley, 128p., ISBN 978-0-575-04998-7	
	Bridge	1992: Lincolnwood (Chicago, Ill), NTC Publishing Group, 136p., ISBN 978-0-8442-3910-1	
	Science Against Nature	1992: Maxwell Macmillan Bridge, 144p., ISBN 978-1-85744-510-7	
Bird, David	The Art of Good Bidding	1992: Faber and Faber (London, Boston), 138p., ISBN 978-0-571-16716-6	
Bird, David	Naturals vs Scientists: The Great Match	1992: Probray Press, Nottingham (England), 152 p., ISBN 978-0-946236-36-7. Played at the Hyde Park Hotel, London, January 27–28, 1992.	
Bird, David	All You Need to Know About Bidding	1992: Victor Gollancz (London) in association with Peter Crawley, Master Bridge Series, 128p., ISBN 978-0-575-05378-6	
Bird, David	All You Need to Know About Play	1993: Victor Gollancz (London) in association with Peter Crawley, Master Bridge Series, 128p., ISBN 978-0-575-05670-1; 1993, 1995: Houghton Mifflin Co. (Boston), 128p., ISBN 978-0-395-72861-1	
McNeil, Keith	Bid Against the Masters	1993: Victor Gollancz (London) in association with Peter Crawley, Master Bridge Series, 128p., ISBN 978-0-575-05450-9	
Trézel, Roger	Blocking, Unblocking and Safety Plays in Bridge	1993: Houghton Mifflin (Boston), Master Bridge Series, 120p., ISBN 978-0-395-65669-3	
Bird, David	That Elusive Extra Trick	1994: Victor Gollancz (London) in association with Peter Crawley, 128p., ISBN 978-0-575-05816-3	
Bird, David	Make A Start At Bridge	1994: Faber & Faber (London), 148p., ISBN 978-0-571-17112-5	
Pottage, Julian	The Extra Edge in Play at Bridge	1994: Victor Gollancz (London) in association with Peter Crawley, 108p., ISBN 978-0-575-05737-1; 2005: Master Point Press (Toronto), 152p., ISBN 978-1-894154-97-0	
	Learn Bridge in Five Days	1995: Batsford (London), 95p., ISBN 978-0-7134-7913-3; 1995, 1996: Sterling Publishing Co. (New York), 95p., ISBN 978-0-8069-6166-8; 2003: Sterling Publishing Co. (New York), Chrysalis (London), 96p.; 2007: Sterling Publishing Co. (New York), 95P., ISBN 978-1-4027-4509-6	
Bird, David	Divine Intervention	1995: Victor Gollancz in association with Peter Crawley (London), Master Bridge Series, 126p., ISBN 978-0-575-06112-5; 2009: Weidenfeld & Nicolson in association with Peter Crawley (London), Master Bridge Series, 126p., ISBN 978-0-297-85559-0	
Bird, David	Famous Bidding Decisions: Test Your Skill Against the Experts	1996: Victor Gollancz (London) in association with Peter Crawley, 128p., ISBN 978-0-575-06295-5; 2001: Cassell & Co. (London) in association with Peter Crawley, 128p., ISBN 978-0-304-35775-8	
Bird, David	Famous Play Decisions: Test Your Skills Against the Experts	1997: Victor Gollancz (London) in association with Peter Crawley, 128p., ISBN 978-0-575-06456-0	
Bird, David	Bridge	1998, 2003: Hodder and Stoughton: Teach Yourself Books (Sevenoaks), 147-176p., ISBN 978-0-340-72131-5, ISBN 978-0-340-86000-7; 1998: Lincolnwood (Chicago, Ill), NTC Publishing Group, 147p., ISBN 978-0-8442-1338-5	
