= French Bridge Federation =

The French Bridge Federation (French: Fédération Française de Bridge – FFB) is the national organization for bridge in France. The president is Patrick Grenthe and the treasurer is Guy Auer. There are also three vice-presidents and 29 regional committees, whose chairmen compose a federation council (conseil fédéral). The headquarters of the French Bridge Federation is in Saint-Cloud, near Paris. It was founded in 1933 and is the third largest bridge federation in the world with over 100,000 members.

The federation also organizes the French Bridge Championship (Championnat de France de bridge).

== Organisation ==
- President: Patrick Grenthe
- Vice-president (Communications, development, marketing): Patrick Bogacki
- Vice-president (competitions, international): Jean-Daniel Chalet
- Vice-president (Bridge university): Pierre Saguet
- Treasurer: Guy Auer
- General secretary: Patern Henry

The president, the vice-presidents, and the general secretary are elected to 4-year terms.

== French bridge players ==
- Pierre Albarran, player and theorist
- Jean-Daniel Chalet, vice-president of the French Bridge Federation
- Pierre Jaïs, world champion
- Michel Lebel, world champion
- Philippe Soulet, world champion
- Roger Trézel, world champion
