= Thomas Bessis =

Thomas Bessis is a French bridge player.

== Bridge accomplishments ==
=== Wins ===
- World Transnational Open Teams Championship (1) 2007
- Buffett Cup (1) 2008
- North American Bridge Championships (3)
  - Vanderbilt (2) 2010, 2012
  - Norman Kay Platinum Pairs (1) 2015
- Cavendish Pairs 2019

=== Runners-up ===
- Bermuda Bowl (1) 2017
- Buffett Cup (1) 2012
- North American Bridge Championships (8)
  - Blue Ribbon Pairs (2) 2011, 2015
  - Fast Open Pairs (1) 2012
  - Norman Kay Platinum Pairs (3) 2012, 2014, 2017
  - Spingold (1) 2013
  - Jacoby Open Swiss Teams (1) 2019
