= Gitelman =

Gitelman is a surname. Notable people with the surname include:

- Fred Gitelman (born 1965), Canadian-American bridge player
- Peter Gitelman (1917–2008), Soviet army officer

== Fictional characters ==
- Hana Gitelman

== See also ==
- Gitelman syndrome
