= Wildavsky =

Wildavsky is a surname. Notable people with the surname include:

- Aaron Wildavsky (1930–1993), American political scientist
- Adam Wildavsky (born 1960), American bridge player
