= Robert Lebi =

Canadian contract bridge player

Robert Lebi is a Canadian contract bridge player. He competed for Team Canada at the 1993 Maccabiah Games in Israel.

== Bridge accomplishments ==
=== Wins ===
- North American Bridge Championships (4)
  - Blue Ribbon Pairs (1) 1989
  - Fast Open Pairs (1) 2006
  - Silodor Open Pairs (1) 2008
  - Wernher Open Pairs (1) 2012

=== Runners-up ===
- North American Bridge Championships (2)
  - Reisinger (1) 1982
  - Fast Open Pairs 2015 (1)
