= Krekorian =

Krekorian is a surname. Notable people with the surname include:

- Jim Krekorian (born 1952), American bridge player
- Paul Krekorian (born 1960), American politician
