= Marty Fleisher =

Martin (Marty) Fleisher (born October 12, 1958) is an American bridge player, employee benefits attorney, manager of investments in life insurance policies and investment advisor.

== Bridge career ==
Having first learned bridge at the age of eight by observing his parents and uncle, Fleisher became the youngest American Contract Bridge League (ACBL) Life Master from the New York metropolitan area in 1976 at age 17. At the same time, his team reached the final of the Grand National Teams knockout championship, making him the youngest player ever to reach the finals of a North American team bridge championship, a record he still holds. Sports Illustrated reported this accomplishment and featured Fleisher in its Faces in the Crowd section. Less than two years later he won the Intercollegiate regional bridge championship by the largest margin ever recorded in a pairs championship.

Fleisher has won thirteen national bridge championships and placed second in nine others. He and Eric Rodwell won the 2000 Cavendish Invitational pairs tournament, the world's strongest contest for money prizes. His team won the United States Bridge Championship for open teams in 2010 and 2024 to gain entry into the 2011 Bermuda Bowl (as one of two US entries) where they finished 4th and the 2024 World Bridge Games where, as the only US entry, they finished tied for 5th. His team placed second in the same event in 2013, 2017, 2019 and 2023 to qualify to play in the Bermuda Bowls held in those years. They finished 9th in 2013 and 12th in 2019, but won the Gold Medal in August 2017 in Lyon, France. As a result, he became a World Grandmaster, which is the highest title awarded by the World Bridge Federation.

Fleisher's team won the Rosenblum Cup at the 2026 World Bridge Series in Katowice Poland for his second open world championship.

Fleisher was named the ACBL Player of the Year for 2013, awarded annually to the member who earns the most platinum masterpoints in the calendar year.

Fleisher was inducted into the Bridge Hall of Fame in 2025.

== Personal ==
Fleisher grew up in Teaneck, New Jersey and graduated from Teaneck High School in 1976. He attended Swarthmore College, and New York University School of Law. He lives in Manhattan with his wife, Andrea Bierstein. He is the half-brother of the American comic book writer Michael Fleisher.

== Bridge accomplishments ==
=== Wins ===
- World Championships (1)
  - Bermuda Bowl 2017
- United States Bridge Championships (6)
  - Open Team Trials 2010
  - Open Team Trials (second qualifier) 2013
  - Open Team Trials (second qualifier) 2017
  - Open Team Trials (second qualifier) 2019
  - Open Team Trials (second qualifier) 2023
  - Open Team Trials 2024
- North American Bridge Championships (12)
  - Mitchell Board-a-Match Teams (1) 2018
  - NABC+ Open Pairs (1) 2024
  - Soloway Knockout Teams (1) 2024
  - Spingold (3) 2016, 2023, 2026
  - Norman Kay Platinum Pairs (1) 2013
  - Vanderbilt Knockout Teams (3) 2011, 2018, 2025
  - Roth Open Swiss Teams (1) 2010
  - Mixed Board-a-Match Teams (1) 2005
  - North American Swiss Teams (1) 2004
- Other notable wins:
  - Cavendish Invitational Pairs (1) 2000
  - Intercollegiate Bridge Championship (1) 1977

=== Runners-up ===
- North American Bridge Championships (9)
  - Vanderbilt (3) 2003, 2010, 2026
  - Jacoby Open Swiss Teams 2014
  - Roth Open Swiss Teams 2013
  - Grand National Teams (1) 1976
  - Life Master Pairs (2) 2006, 2012
  - Open Pairs I (1) 2003
  - Mixed Pairs (1) 2004
- United States Bridge Championships (2)
  - Open Team Trials 2009
  - Open Team Trials 2016

== Publications ==
- Individual Retirement Account Answer Book, 19th edition, Aspen Publishers, 2012, ISBN 978-0-7355-7419-9.
