= Canapé (bridge) =

Bidding method in the game of contract bridge

Canapé is a bridge bidding method in which the second suit bid may be (or must be) longer than or at least as long as the first. The name Canapé is the French word for "an appetizer".

Canapé is the invention of Pierre Albarran, a French auction and contract bridge player, theorist, and author. His book on the topic is long out-of-print and hard to find. A French pair, Pierre Jaïs and Roger Trézel, used a canapé system to become one of the strongest pairs in the world during the 1950s and 1960s. They achieved a triple crown of major world championships from 1956 to 1962, two at teams-of-four representing France and the inaugural World Open Pairs Championship. Canapé is also the basis of the Roman Club and Blue Team Club systems, which were used by the Italian Blue Team to win many world championships in the 1950s and 1960s. Some of the early Blue Team players used a "natural" canapé style. A "Modified Italian Canapé System" is still in use today.

Canapé openings have several technical advantages:

- It is easy to find 4-4 major-suit fits, and responder may quickly raise the bidding-level.
- When you immediately find a 4-4 major-suit fit, opener may never reveal his longer side-suit, making defence considerably more difficult.
- Opening a 4-card major on balanced hands has more preemptive value, than opening a 2- or 3-card minor in standard system.
- When opening with a longer side-suit, Left-Hand-Opponent is less likely to have a shape fit for a takeout-double, and may not be able to enter the bidding.
- Often, a canapé-bidder opens a 4-card suit where Left-Hand-Opponent has 4 or more cards making it more difficult for opponents to enter the bidding.
- Over a canapé-opening, opponents will sometimes overcall in openers 5+suit, making them vulnerable to penalty-doubles.
- When playing a strong-1♣ system, canapé openings can be used to resolve the mediocre 2♣-opening in many such systems (e.g. Precision Club and similar).

The following examples apply to some canapé systems but not all:

The hand ♠KQ73 ♥5 ♦AQJ94 ♣J54 is opened 1♠. If partner does not raise the spades, the diamond suit is introduced in the next bidding round. With the spade and diamond suits reversed (♠AQJ94 ♥5 ♦KQ73 ♣J54) the prescribed opening is 1♦ followed by a spade bid in the next round. The consequence of this approach is that on more balanced hands such as hands with a 4-4-3-2 distribution, only one four card suit can be introduced. With the hand ♠KQ73 ♥95 ♦AQJ4 ♣J54 a Canapé bidder will open 1♠ and following a 2♣ response rebid notrump. Hands with a 5-3-3-2 distribution are either opened in the five card suit followed by a notrump rebid (or a rebid in the same suit if the suit is solid), or in certain cases opened Canapé on a strong three card suit.

== See also ==
- Comfy Canapé
