= Allan Graves =

Canadian-American bridge player

Allan Graves is a Canadian-American bridge player.

== Bridge accomplishments ==
- Canadian Bridge Hall of Fame
- Seven Canadian national championships

=== Wins ===
- World Bridge Championships (1)
  - World Senior Teams 2017 (USA) gold medal
- North American Bridge Championships (5)
  - Jacoby Open Swiss Teams (1) 2013
  - Keohane North American Swiss Teams (1) 1986
  - Truscott Senior Swiss Teams (1) 2008
  - Mitchell Board a Match (1) 2015
  - Jacoby Open Swiss Teams (1) 2016

=== Runners-up ===
- World Bridge Federation
  - World Mixed Teams ( 2019 ) USA Silver medal
  - World Bridge Olympiad (1982) Canada Bronze medal.
- North American Bridge Championships (3)
  - Senior Knockout Teams (1) 2009
  - Reisinger (1) 1978
  - Spingold (1) 2002
