= Lou Ann O'Rourke =

American bridge player

Lou Ann O'Rourke was an American bridge player. She died on Monday, December 16, 2019.

== Bridge accomplishments ==
=== Wins ===
- North American Bridge Championships (1)
  - Roth Open Swiss Teams (1) 2007

=== Runners-up ===
- North American Bridge Championships (8)
  - Senior Knockout Teams (1) 2011
  - Grand National Teams (1) 2002
  - Jacoby Open Swiss Teams (3) 2006, 2009, 2011
  - Chicago Mixed Board-a-Match (1) 2001
  - Roth Open Swiss Teams (1) 2009
  - Vanderbilt (1) 2007

== Personal life ==
O'Rourke lived in Portola Valley, California. She was married to the late J. Tracy O'Rourke.
