= Alex Tschekaloff =

American bridge player

Alex Tschekaloff is an American bridge player.

== Bridge accomplishments ==
=== Wins ===
- North American Bridge Championships (2)
  - Blue Ribbon Pairs (1) 1969
  - Nail Life Master Open Pairs (1) 1965
