= Christina Lund Madsen =

Danish bridge player and journalist

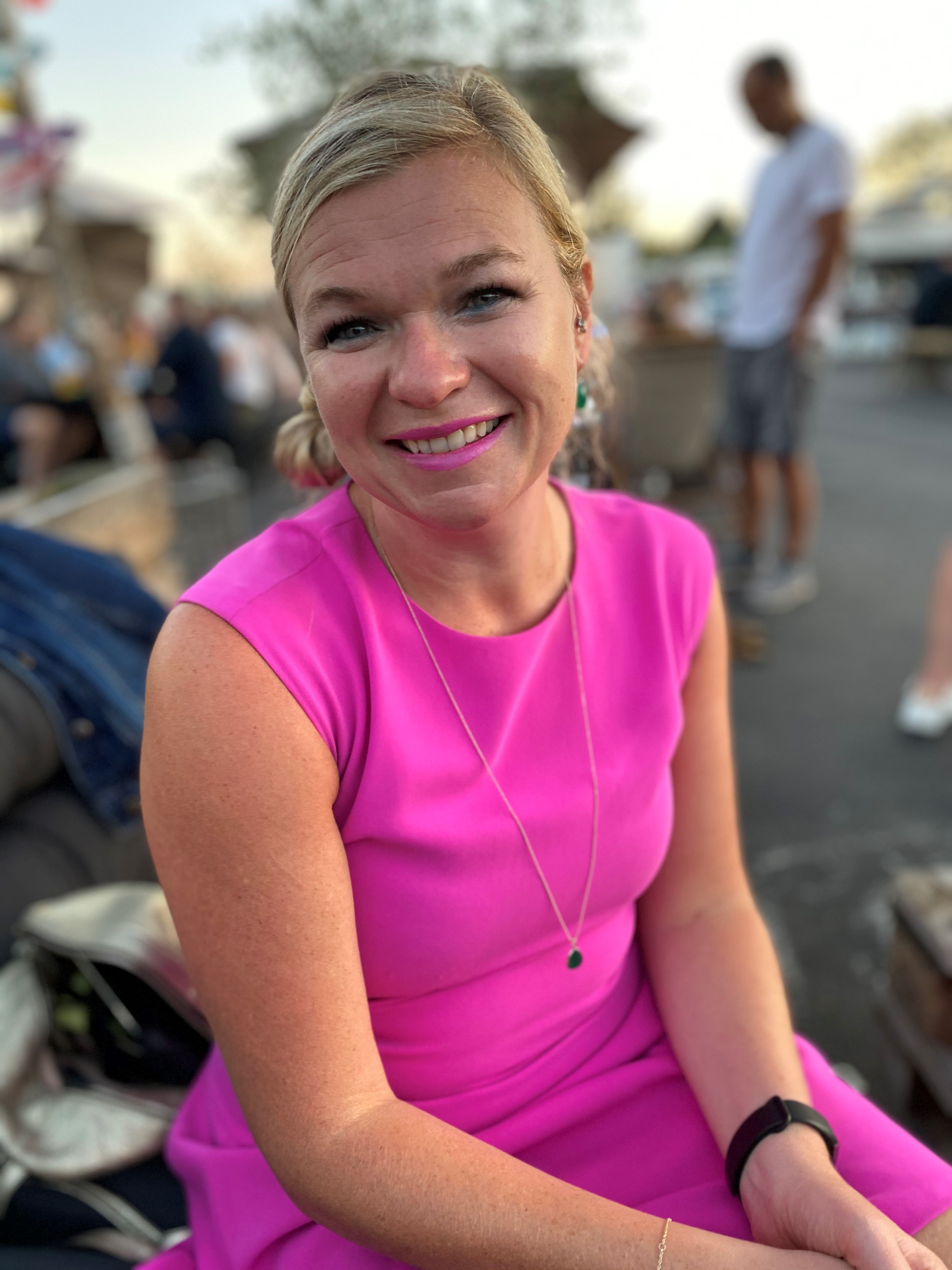
Christina Lund Madsen

Christina Lund Madsen is a world champion Danish bridge player and journalist.

Lund Madsen has won four Danish Championships and was the editor of the Danish Bridge Magazine for 6 years.

On June 11, 2015 Lund Madsen won a talent award/scholarship from HRH Prince Henrik of Denmark as a bridge player and role model/communicator of bridge.

== Bridge accomplishments ==
=== Wins ===
- Nordic Women's Teams Championships 2013
- Nordic Women's Teams Championships 2015
- European Mixed Championships in Tromsø, Norway, 2015
- European Mixed Championships in Istanbul 2019
- North American Bridge Championships (2)
  - Jacoby Open Swiss Teams (1) 2014
  - Freeman Mixed BAM 2019
- World Mixed Championships in Wroclaw, Poland 2022

=== Runners-up ===
- Bronze winner 15th World Bridge Series Mixed Teams 2018
