= Joshua Donn =

American bridge player

Joshua Samuel Donn (born June 1, 1982 in Knoxville, Tennessee) is a multi national champion and a gold medal world junior champion in contract bridge. He is known as a bridge lecturer as well as author. Donn is an American Contract Bridge League Grand Life Master. He is the all-time leader of Richard Pavlicek's monthly polls that ran from 2000–2006 and had thousands of participants from over 90 countries. He currently resides in Las Vegas, Nevada with his daughter.

== Publications ==
Donn authored a popular online column called "Breakin' the Rules" from 2011 to 2015. He co-authored a book called More Breaking the Rules: Second Hand Play with Barry Rigal in 2013. He has moderated and written a column in the ACBL Bridge Bulletin called "The Bidding Box" since 2021. And he writes the column "You're Doin It Wrong" for the online Bridge World magazine at bridgeworld.com since 2006.

== Bridge accomplishments ==
=== Awards ===
- Joan Gerard Youth Award, World Bridge Federation
- Finalist, International Bridge Press Association "Yeh Bros. 2014 Best Bid Deal of the Year" for Josh Donn & Adam Kaplan in "Grand Bidding" by Sue Munday
- Finalist, International Bridge Press Association "2014 Master Point Press Book of the Year" for More Breaking the Rules – Second-Hand Play by Barry Rigal and Josh Donn

=== Wins ===
- World Youth Bridge Team Championships 2006
- Roth Open Swiss Teams 2008
- Kaplan Blue Ribbon Pairs 2011
- Roth Open Swiss Teams 2016
- Roth Open Swiss Teams 2019
- Jacoby Open Swiss Teams 2026

=== Runners-up ===
- NABC+ Mixed Swiss Teams 2016
- Grand National Teams 2016
- North American Pairs Flight A 2024
- Rosenblum Cup 2026 (Bronze Medal)

=== Service ===
- ACBL Hall of Fame Committee
- USBF Credentials Committee
- Certified Arbitrator for the Institute for Bridge Arbitration
- Member of the International Bridge Press Association
