= Mary Oshlag =

American bridge player (1942–2021)

Mary Oshlag (1942–2021) was an American bridge player. Mary was a national champion. Her husband, Richard Oshlag, is also a national champion.

Mary was the inventor of "Eight is Enough", an event that encourages stronger players to play with weaker players.

== Bridge accomplishments ==
=== Wins ===
- North American Bridge Championships (1)
  - Truscott Senior Swiss Teams (1) 2011

=== Runners-up ===
- North American Bridge Championships (2)
  - Chicago Mixed Board-a-Match (1) 1989
  - Wagar Women's Knockout Teams (1) 1999
- Australian Bridge Championships (1)
  - Australian Women Open Teams (1) 1997

The Chicago Mixed Board-A-Match is now known as the Freeman Mixed Board-A-Match.
