= Jay Apfelbaum =

American bridge player

Jay M. Apfelbaum (born 1951) of Pittsburgh, PA is an American bridge player. With a background as a lawyer and administrative law judge, he served three years as a member of the American Contract Bridge League (ACBL) Board of Directors and edited its appeals books.

He has been an accredited tournament director, including serving at the national level, for over 20 years. Apfelbaum won the Blue Ribbon Pairs in 1976 and holds the ACBL title of Emerald Life Master.

== Bridge accomplishments ==
=== Wins ===
- North American Bridge Championships (1)
  - Blue Ribbon Pairs (1) 1976

=== Runners-up ===
- North American Bridge Championships (1)
  - Grand National Teams (1) 1993

== Publications ==
- —— (1998). Reno 1998 Spring NABC Appeals Committee Decisions. Memphis, TN: ACBL.
- —— (2011). The Bridge Monologues: Bidding Without Opposition. Ottawa, Canada: Baico Publishing Inc. ISBN 978-1-926945-20-0.
- —— (2016). Six Steps to Winning Declarer Play. Toronto, Canada: Master Point Press. ISBN 978-1-77140-158-6.
