= Richard Oshlag =

American bridge player

Richard Oshlag is an American bridge player. He is a national champion. His wife, Mary Oshlag, was also a national champion.

== Bridge accomplishments ==
=== Wins ===
- North American Bridge Championships (5)
  - Truscott Senior Swiss Teams (1) 2011
  - Fast Open Pairs (2) 2017, 2018
  - Silodor Open Pairs (1) 2019
  - Mitchell Board-a-Match Teams (1) 2024

=== Runners-up ===
- North American Bridge Championships (4)
  - Chicago Mixed Board-a-Match (1) 1989
  - North American Pairs (2) 2013, 2015
  - Fast Open Pairs (1) 2019

The Chicago Mixed Board-A-Match is now known as the Freeman Mixed Board-A-Match.
