= Mike Smolen =

American bridge player

Michael Jerrold Smolen (November 18, 1940 – November 25, 1992) was an American bridge player from Chicago.

He was the inventor of the popular Smolen convention, an extension of Stayman, which is employed when the partner of a 1NT opener shows his/her 5+ card major.

Smolen, who lived in Alamo, California during his career, died in Los Angeles in 1992.

== Bridge accomplishments ==
=== Awards ===
- Fishbein Trophy (1) 1982

=== Wins ===
- North American Bridge Championships (5)
  - Rockwell Mixed Pairs (1) 1979
  - Jacoby Open Swiss Teams (1) 1982
  - Keohane North American Swiss Teams (1) 1978
  - Mitchell Board-a-Match Teams (1) 1976
  - Reisinger (1) 1984

=== Runners-up ===
- North American Bridge Championships
  - Wernher Open Pairs (1) 1990
  - Jacoby Open Swiss Teams (1) 1990
  - Mitchell Board-a-Match Teams (1) 1974
