= Jeff Meckstroth =

American bridge player (born 1956)

Jeffrey John (Jeff) Meckstroth (born May 15, 1956) is an American professional contract bridge player. He is a multiple world champion, winning the Bermuda Bowl on USA teams five times. He is one of only ten players who have won the so-called triple crown of bridge: the Bermuda Bowl, the World Open Pairs and the World Team Olympiad. As of May 16, 2016, he was the fifth-ranking World Grand Master. For decades Meckstroth has been in a regular partnership with Eric Rodwell and together, nicknamed "Meckwell", they are one of the most successful bridge partnerships of all time. They are well known for playing an aggressive and very detailed system that derived from Precision Club.

One of Meckstroth's iconic achievements was winning three of the four available major events contested at the ACBL's 2008 fall championships, the Open Board-A-Match Teams, Blue Ribbon Pairs, and Reisinger Teams.

He became ACBL's all-time leading masterpoint holder when he went past Paul Soloway's long held record during the Indianapolis Winter Regional in March 2010.

Meckstroth was born in Springfield, Ohio. He is a full-time bridge professional and lives in Clearwater Beach, Florida with his wife, Sally Chapleau-Meckstroth.

== Bridge accomplishments ==
=== Awards ===
- ACBL Player of the Decade (3)1990s, 2000s, 2010s
- ACBL Player of the Year (3) 1992, 2004, 2009
- Barry Crane Top 500 1993, 1995, 2000, 2001, 2002, 2006, 2007, 2008
- Mott-Smith Trophy 1979, 1980, 1985, 2000, 2009, 2017
- Fishbein Trophy 1996, 2004, 2007
- Herman Trophy 1980, 1982, 1995, 2004
- ACBL King of Bridge 1974
- Le Bridgeur Award (Best Played Hand of the Year) 1998
- IBPA Award (Best Played Hand of the Year) 1999
- Goren Trophy (1) 2009

=== Wins ===
- Bermuda Bowl (5) 1981, 1995, 2000, 2003, 2009
- World Open Team Olympiad (1) 1988
- World Open Pairs (1) 1986
- World Mixed Pairs (1) 2002
- North American Bridge Championships (62)
  - Senior Knockout Teams (3) 2013, 2014, 2016
  - Grand National Teams (14) 1990, 1997, 1999, 2000, 2002, 2004, 2007, 2008, 2011, 2012, 2013, 2014, 2015, 2018
  - Jacoby Open Swiss Teams (6) 1989, 1994, 2002, 2006, 2008, 2009
  - Blue Ribbon Pairs (3) 1982, 2008, 2016
  - Mitchell Board-a-Match Teams (2) 1984, 2008
  - Nail Life Master Open Pairs (1) 1979
  - Reisinger (9) 1979, 1985, 1993, 1994, 1995, 2004, 2005, 2008, 2009
  - Rockwell Mixed Pairs (1) 1980
  - Silodor Open Pairs (3) 1979, 1992, 2016
  - Spingold (12) 1984, 1988, 1991, 1993, 1994, 1995, 1996, 1998, 1999, 2004, 2006, 2007
  - Vanderbilt (7) 1980, 1982, 1985, 2000, 2003, 2014, 2017
  - Wernher Open Pairs (1) 1999
- United States Bridge Championships (13)
  - Open Team Trials (13) 1980, 1988, 1991, 1992, 1998, 2001, 2002, 2004, 2007, 2008, 2012, 2014, 2017
- European Open Bridge Championships (1)
  - Open Pairs (1) 2003
- Other notable wins:
  - Buffett Cup (1) 2010
  - Cavendish Invitational Teams (2) 2000, 2003
  - Cavendish Invitational Pairs (1) 2019
  - Macallan Invitational Pairs (2) 1995, 1996

=== Runners-up ===
- Bermuda Bowl (2) 1997, 2005
- World Open Team Olympiad (1) 1992
- Rosenblum Cup (1) 2010
- North American Bridge Championships (26)
  - Senior Knockout Teams (1) 2012
  - Grand National Teams (3) 1994, 2003, 2005
  - Jacoby Open Swiss Teams (2) 2005, 2010
  - Mitchell Board-a-Match Teams (2) 1998, 1999
  - Chicago Mixed Board-a-Match (2) 1983, 1992
  - Nail Life Master Open Pairs (2) 1985, 1992
  - Norman Kay Platinum Pairs (1) 2013
  - Reisinger (1) 1980
  - Spingold (4) 1985, 1990, 2011, 2012
  - Vanderbilt (6) 1979, 1991, 1996, 2002, 2018, 2019
  - Keohane North American Swiss Teams (1) 2022
  - von Zedtwitz Life Master Pairs (1) 1983
- United States Bridge Championships (4)
  - Open Team Trials (4) 1982, 1984, 1985, 1997
- Other notable 2nd places:
  - Cavendish Invitational Teams (1) 1997
  - Cap Volmac World Top Invitational Pairs (1) 1994
  - Sunday Times–Macallan Invitational Pairs (1) 1993
  - Cavendish Invitational Pairs (1) 1984

== Publications ==
- "New Minor Forcing & Fourth Suit Forcing & Artificial" (Louisville: Devyn Press, 1985), Championship Bridge no. 28 OCLC 30325706 – pamphlet
- Win the Bermuda Bowl With Me, Meckstroth and Marc Smith (Toronto: Master Point Press, 2001), ISBN 1-894154-33-9, 188 pp.
