= Allan Falk =

American bridge player

Allan Falk is an American bridge player.

== Bridge accomplishments ==
=== Wins ===
- North American Bridge Championships (3)
  - Blue Ribbon Pairs (1) 1997
  - Silodor Open Pairs (1) 1994
  - Wernher Open Pairs (1) 1997

=== Runners-up ===
- North American Bridge Championships (1)
  - Grand National Teams (1) 1996
