= Haig Tchamitch =

American bridge player

Haig Tchamitch (born 1951) is an American bridge player. Haig is an Armenian, who was born and grew up in Lebanon, lived for a few years in Canada and currently lives in Arizona.

== Bridge accomplishments ==
=== Awards ===
- Herman Trophy (1) 1992

=== Wins ===
- North American Bridge Championships (1)
  - Blue Ribbon Pairs (1) 1992
  - Grand National Teams (1) 2019
