= Eric Rodwell =

American bridge player (born 1957)

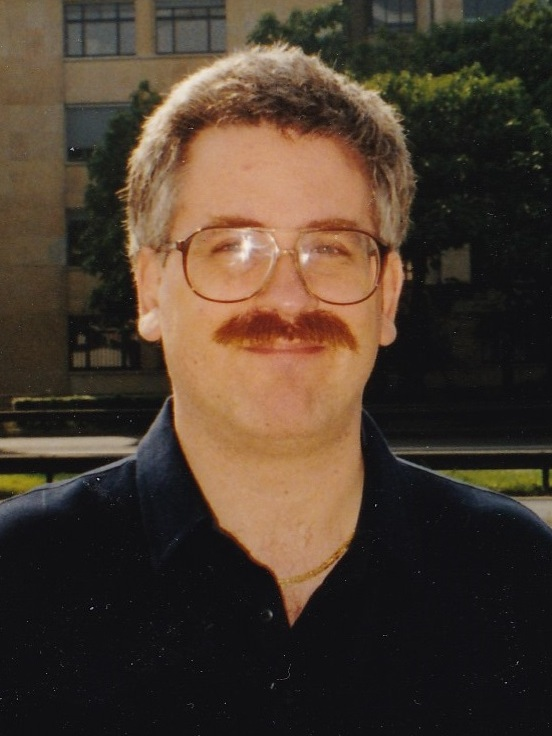
Rodwell in 1998

Eric Victor Rodwell (born May 1, 1957) is an American professional bridge player. He has won the Bermuda Bowl representing the United States five times and is one of ten players who have won the triple crown of bridge: the Bermuda Bowl, the World Open Pairs and the World Team Olympiad.

== Personal life ==
Rodwell was born in San Francisco, California and his family moved to West Lafayette, Indiana in 1965 where his father was a professor of biochemistry at Purdue University. He started playing bridge at the age of eleven by reading books and playing with his parents. Rodwell graduated from West Lafayette High School in 1974 and attended Purdue, graduating with a master's degree in finance in 1981. Rodwell is currently a full-time bridge professional and lives in Clearwater Beach, Florida with his wife Donna; each has two children from previous marriages, his being twins Jeffrey and Sara (b. 1984).

== Bridge career ==
For decades Rodwell has been in a regular partnership with Jeff Meckstroth, and "Meckwell", for their surnames, is one of the most successful pairs of all time. They are well known for playing an aggressive and very detailed system called RM Precision (for Rodwell-Meckstroth), of which Rodwell is the principal theorist and author. Although he first learned basic Precision at the age of 14, he didn't get serious about developing his own version until 1982 after he and Meckstroth were already winning. Most of RM Precision was developed subsequently in the early '80s with adaptations following more slowly thereafter. As a bidding theorist, Rodwell has created several conventions and methods including the support double, conventional transfers in many situations, the pass-double inversion and the serious three notrump. Although the Unusual Major Jumps Over One Diamond Opening convention (UMJOODO) is often credited to him, he denies inventing it.

Although he has not actively pursued masterpoints as a goal, he is one of the all-time top masterpoint holders in the American Contract Bridge League, and won the Barry Crane Trophy for winning the most masterpoints in a year in 2004. Possibly his most remarkable achievement was at the ACBL's 2008 fall championships, where with four major events available to be contested, he won three (Open Board-A-Match Teams, Blue Ribbon Pairs, Reisinger Teams) and finished second in the fourth (Life Master Open Pairs). The three wins were with Jeff Meckstroth, and the second place with John Diamond.

As of 2022, Rodwell is inactive in face to face bridge. North American Bridge Championships require all participants to be vaccinated against COVID19, and Rodwell has refused to be vaccinated.

== Bridge accomplishments ==
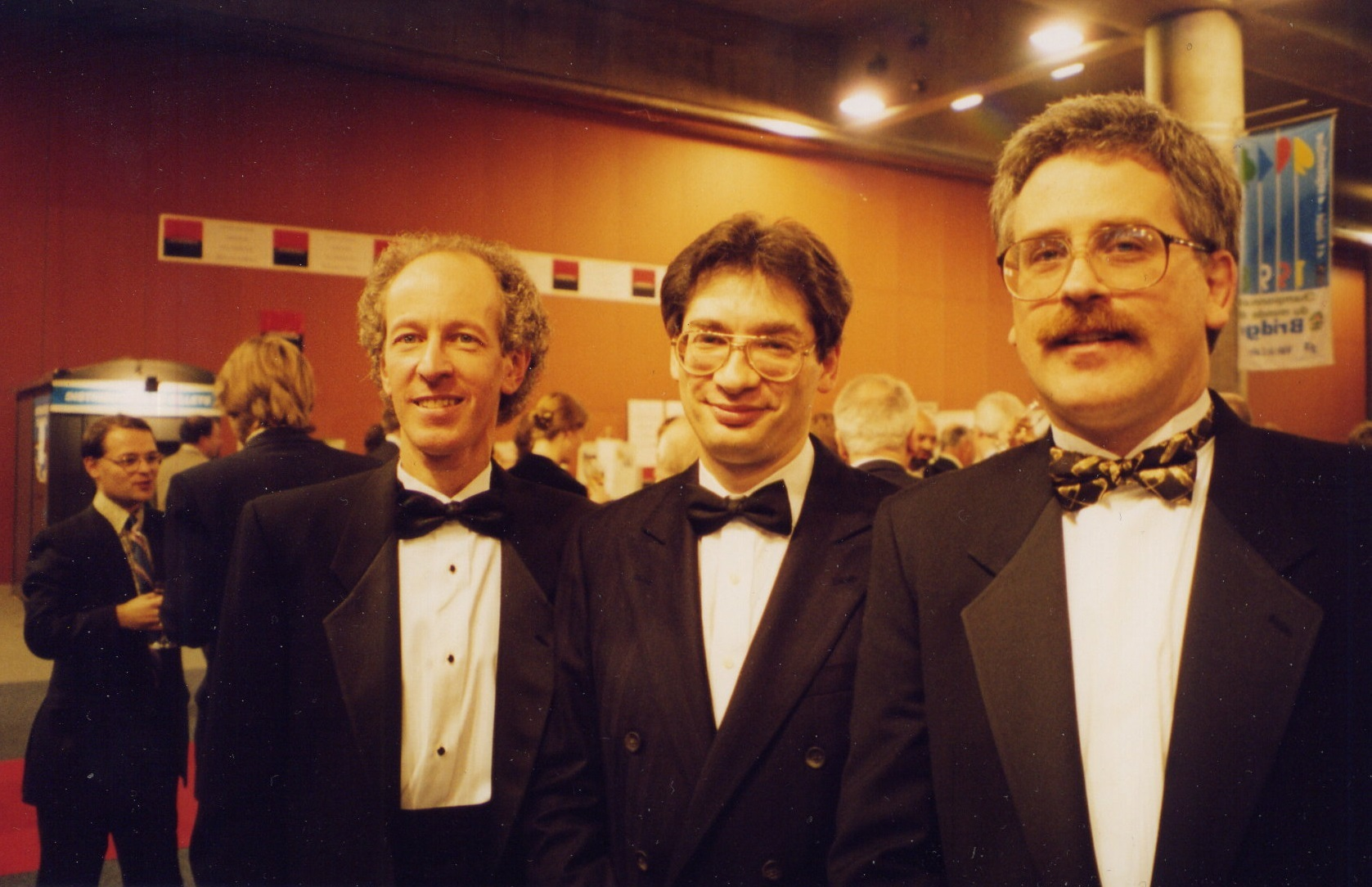
Bart Bramley, Michael Rosenberg, Eric Rodwell (left to right) Par contest winners at World Championships 1998, Lille, France

=== Awards ===
- ACBL Player of the Year 2008
- Barry Crane Top 500 2004
- Mott-Smith Trophy 1980
- Fishbein Trophy 1991, 1999, 2004, 2007
- Herman Trophy 1982, 1985, 1998
- Goren Trophy 2008

=== Wins ===
- Bermuda Bowl (5) 1981, 1995, 2000, 2003, 2009
- World Open Team Olympiad (1) 1988
- World Open Pairs (1) 1986
- North American Bridge Championships (57)
  - Vanderbilt (7) 1980, 1982, 1985, 2000, 2003, 2014, 2017
  - Spingold (12) 1984, 1988, 1991, 1993, 1994, 1995, 1996, 1998, 1999, 2004, 2006, 2007
  - Reisinger (9) 1979, 1985, 1993, 1994, 1995, 2004, 2005, 2008, 2009
  - Grand National Teams (12) 1990, 1999, 2000, 2002, 2004, 2007, 2008, 2011, 2012, 2013, 2014, 2015
  - Open Board-a-Match Teams (1) 2008
  - Men's Board-a-Match Teams (1) 1984
  - Jacoby Open Swiss Teams (5) 1994, 2002, 2006, 2008, 2009
  - North American Men's Swiss Teams (1) 1989
  - Blue Ribbon Pairs (3) 1982, 1985, 2008
  - Life Master Pairs (3) 1980, 1986, 1991
  - Life Master Men's Pairs (1) 1979
  - Open Pairs (1) 1979
  - Open Pairs II (1) 1999
- United States Bridge Championships (13)
  - Open Team Trials (13) 1980, 1988, 1991, 1992, 1998, 2001, 2002, 2004, 2007, 2008, 2012, 2014, 2017
- European Open Bridge Championships (1)
  - Open Pairs (1) 2003
- Other notable wins:
  - Cavendish Invitational Teams (3) 2000, 2003, 2008
  - Staten Bank World Top Invitational Pairs (1) 1988
  - Macallan Invitational Pairs (2) 1995, 1996
  - Cavendish Invitational Pairs (2) 2000, 2008

=== Runners-up ===
- Bermuda Bowl (2) 1997, 2005
- World Open Team Olympiad (1) 1992
- North American Bridge Championships (23)
  - Vanderbilt (5) 1991, 1996, 2002, 2018, 2019
  - Spingold (5) 1979, 1985, 1990, 2011, 2012
  - Reisinger (1) 1980
  - Grand National Teams (3) 1994, 2003, 2005
  - Open Board-a-Match Teams (2) 1998, 1999
  - Jacoby Open Swiss Teams (1) 2005
  - Master Mixed Teams (1) 1983
  - Blue Ribbon Pairs (1) 1998
  - Life Master Pairs (1) 1983
  - Life Master Open Pairs (2) 1992, 2008
  - Life Master Men's Pairs (1) 1985
  - Roth Open Swiss Teams (2) 2015, 2018
- United States Bridge Championships (6)
  - Open Team Trials (6) 1982, 1984, 1985, 1993, 1997, 2009
- Other notable 2nd places:
  - Cavendish Invitational Teams (1) 2009
  - Cap Volmac World Top Invitational Pairs (1) 1994
  - Sunday Times–Macallan Invitational Pairs (1) 1993
  - Cavendish Invitational Pairs (3) 1984, 2006, 2009

== Publications ==
- Grant, Audrey; Rodwell, Eric (1984). The Joy of Bridge. Scarborough, Ontario: Prentice-Hall Canada Inc.

- Revised edition, 1989, ISBN 0-13-511585-X.
- French language edition, Le plaisir du bridge, Saint-Laurent, Québec: Éditions du Trécarré, 1988, ISBN 289249253X, transl. Bernard Bourget (374 pp.)

- Plaisir du bridge: cahier d'exercices, Trécarré, 1989, ISBN 2892493072 (135 pp.) – translation of The Joy of Bridge companion (exercises)
- Grant, Audrey; Rodwell, Eric (1987). Bridge Maxims: secrets of better play. Scarborough, Ontario: Prentice-Hall Canada Inc. ISBN 0-13-081936-0.
- Grant, Audrey; Rodwell, Eric (2009). 2 Over 1 Game Force. Louisville, KY: Baron Barclay Bridge Supply. ISBN 978-0-939460-84-7.
- Rodwell, Eric; Horton, Mark (2011). The Rodwell Files: secrets of a bridge champion. Toronto: Master Point Press. ISBN 978-1-897106-67-9.
