= Chris Willenken =

American bridge player

Chris Willenken (born 1975) is an American bridge player.

Willenken is an American Contract Bridge League Grand Life Master and a World Bridge Federation World Grand Master. In 2011, he won the gold medal at the inaugural Sport Accord World Mind Games Individual Championship. In World Bridge Federation competition, Willenken won the 2023 World Mixed Team Championships and reached the finals in 2018 and 2021. He also reached the finals of the 2026 Rosenblum Teams.

Willenken is also a Partner and Co-founder at the venture capital firm Blackwoood Healthcare Breakthroughs.

== Bridge accomplishments ==
=== Wins ===
- North American Bridge Championships (6)
  - Fast Open Pairs (2) 2000, 2005
  - Wernher Open Pairs (1) 2001
  - Jacoby Open Swiss Teams (1) 2004
  - Chicago Mixed Board-a-Match (1) 2008
  - Vanderbilt Knockout Teams (1) 2022
- SportAccord World Mind Games
  - Open Individual Championship (1) 2011
- United States Bridge Championships
  - Open Team Trials (1) 2013

=== Runners-up ===
- North American Bridge Championships (9)
  - Fast Open Pairs (1) 2002
  - North American Pairs (2) 2004, 2007
  - Grand National Teams (1) 2007
  - Jacoby Open Swiss Teams (1) 2014
  - Roth Open Swiss Teams (3) 2011, 2013, 2026
  - Spingold (1) 2018
- United States Bridge Championships
  - Open Team Trials (1) 2016
