= Michael Polowan =

American bridge player

Michael Polowan is an American bridge player.

== Bridge accomplishments ==
=== Awards ===
- Mott-Smith Trophy (1) 1995

=== Wins ===
- North American Bridge Championships (4)
  - Jacoby Open Swiss Teams (3) 1999, 2004, 2011
  - Vanderbilt (1) 1995

=== Runners-up ===
- North American Bridge Championships (9)
  - Freeman Mixed Board-a-Match (1) 2014
  - Grand National Teams (2) 2012, 2013
  - Keohane North American Swiss Teams (1) 2013
  - Mitchell Board-a-Match Teams (2) 2009, 2011
  - Nail Life Master Open Pairs (2) 1990, 1994
  - Roth Open Swiss Teams (1) 2010
