= Jack Zhao =

Chinese professional contract bridge player

Jie "Jack" Zhao (born 14 June 1969) is a Chinese professional contract bridge player. He became a World Bridge Federation Grand Master (WGM) in 2014. (Note: Zhao became an Open WGM at the quadrennial World Bridge Series meet October 2014 in Sanya, China. There he and Kerri Shuman of the United States won the World Mixed Pairs Championship and he played on the world 5th-place open team (Rosenblum Cup). See "Players Whose WBF Titles Have Changed This Year" at WBF Master Points (wbfmasterpoints.com), retrieved 2015-01-16; select the WBF Code beside his name to visit his Player Master Point History.)

== Bridge career ==
Zhao and Zhong Fu won the quadrennial World Open Pairs Championship, 2006 in Verona, Italy. On a team of five players that same year, they won the annual Vanderbilt, the oldest major tournament in North America. Zhao has more than 10 Chinese National Championships, and has represented China from 2003 to 2009 in various World Championship events including quarterfinal or better finishes in the Bermuda Bowl, the Mind Sport Olympics, the transnational teams, and the Rosenblum.

Zhao played on China open teams that qualified for the biennial Bermuda Bowl as Pacific Asia (zone 6) champions in 2005, 2007, and 2009. (The latter finished fourth, China's only appearance in the Bermuda Bowl semifinals.) He played for China in the 2003 Bermuda Bowl as well, as a high runner-up in zone 6.

Zhao and Kerri Sanborn of the U.S. won the quadrennial World Mixed Pairs Championship in 2014. As a player primarily affiliated with China and zone 6, he was the first from outside Europe and North America, World Bridge Federation zones 1 and 2, to win any gold, silver, or bronze medal in 13 renditions from 1966. At the same time Sanborn, who won as Kerri Shuman in 1978, became the first player to win the gold medal twice.

== Personal ==
Zhao is a full-time professional bridge player and lives in Tianjin, China, as well as Florida, United States. He travels frequently between the two countries. His family is currently in Florida.

== Bridge accomplishments ==
=== Wins ===
- Vanderbilt, 2006
- World Open Pairs Championship, 2006
- Cavendish Invitational Teams, 2009
- 10 Chinese national championships
- 5 Pacific Asia Bridge Federation championships as part of the China national team
- Dutch national teams champion, 2000
- Dutch national pairs champion, 1998

=== Other finishes ===
- Vanderbilt: Semifinalist, 2008
- Bermuda Bowl: 5th place, 2007; 4th, 2009 (China national team)
- World Transnational Teams: 2nd place, 2003; 4th, 2005

The Transnational Teams permit late entry by players from national teams knocked out before the Bermuda Bowl semifinals. China finished 12th, 10th, 5th, and 4th in the last four Bermuda Bowl tournaments, 2003 to 2009; thus it was possible for Zhao (or the China team intact) to enter the Transnational Teams as well, except in 2009, and to finish 2nd, 4th, and 10th.
