= Norman Kay Platinum Pairs =

National bridge championship

The Norman Kay Platinum Pairs national bridge championship is held at the spring American Contract Bridge League (ACBL) North American Bridge Championship (NABC).

The Norman Kay Platinum Pairs is a six-session open-pairs event with two qualifying, two semi-final, and two final sessions. It is restricted to those players who have earned 50 platinum masterpoints over the three calendar years prior, earned at least 200 platinum points lifetime, or earned the rank of Platinum Life Master or Grand Life Master.

== History ==
The Platinum Pairs were approved by the ACBL Board of Directors in 2008 to start in 2010. In 2011, the Board of Directors renamed the Platinum Pairs the Norman Kay Platinum Pairs.

Its introduction in 2010 gives the three annual NABC meets each one three-day pairs tournament open to all players without regard to age, sex, nationality, or membership. The Platinum Pairs shares the Spring NABC with the North American Pairs, restricted to ACBL members who qualify in one of its 25 Districts, many of which require qualification in local Units. It also requires past achievement greater than that required by the summer Von Zedtwitz Life Master Pairs or the fall Edgar Kaplan Blue Ribbon Pairs (but all are within reach for leading players from overseas who attend a few American meets).

== Winners ==
In the first six renditions to 2015, Thomas Bessis was runner-up twice and winner once. Bessis and Cedric Lorenzini, both of France, were second in 2014 and first in 2015.

Platinum Pairs, 2010 to present
Year	Winners	Runners-up
2010	Franco Baseggio, Andy Stark	Peter Fredin, Gary Gottlieb
2011	John Hurd, Joel Wooldridge	Ken Kranyak, Laurie Kranyak
2012	Bob Hamman, Justin Lall	Thomas Bessis, Ishmael Delmonte
2013	Marty Fleisher, Michael Kamil	Jeff Meckstroth, JoAnna Stansby
2014	Richard Coren, Bobby Levin	Thomas Bessis, Cédric Lorenzini
2015	Thomas Bessis, Cédric Lorenzini	Massimiliano Di Franco, Andrea Manno
2016	Geoff Hampson, Eric Greco	Joel Wooldridge, Kent Mignocchi
2017	Justin Lall, Dennis Bilde	Jeff Meckstroth, Thomas Bessis
2018	Steve Weinstein, Bobby Levin	Vincent Demuy, Dror Padon
2019	Curtis Cheek, Zia Mahmood	Glenn Milgrim, Barry Rigal
2020	(Cancelled)	
2021	(Cancelled)	
2022	Michael Rosenberg, Zachary Grossack	Jeff Meckstroth, Eric Greco
2023	John Hurd, Vincent Demuy	Irene Baroni, Ola Rimstedt
2024	Joel Wooldridge, Kent Mignocchi	Oren Toledano, Ami Zamir

== See also ==
- Edgar Kaplan Blue Ribbon Pairs, or simply Blue Ribbons Pairs
- Von Zedtwitz Life Master Pairs, or simply Life Masters Pairs
