= Bob Etter =

American bridge and football player (born 1945)

- Etter in 1972

No. 3
- Position: Placekicker

Personal information
- Born: August 8, 1945 (age 81); Chattanooga, Tennessee, U.S.
- Listed height: 5 ft 11 in (1.80 m)
- Listed weight: 157 lb (71 kg)

Career information
- High school: Chattanooga Central
- College: Georgia (1963-1966)
- NFL draft: 1968: undrafted

Career history
- Atlanta Falcons (1968–1969); Memphis Southmen (1974-1975)

Awards and highlights
- Pro Bowl (1969); First-team All-SEC (1966); Florida–Georgia Hall of Fame

Career NFL statistics
- Field goals: 26/51
- Field goal %: 51
- Longest field goal: 42
- Extra points: 50/52
- Stats at Pro Football Reference

Robert Glenn Etter (born August 8, 1945) is an American former professional football player who was a placekicker for four seasons in the National Football League (NFL) and World Football League (WFL) during the 1960s and 1970s. He played college football for the Georgia Bulldogs. He played professionally for the NFL's Atlanta Falcons in 1968 and 1969, and the Memphis Southmen of the WFL in 1974 and 1975.

Etter later became an American Contract Bridge League (ACBL) Grand Life Master.

== Biography ==
Etter was born in Chattanooga, Tennessee.

He was a professor of mathematics at California State University, Sacramento for 32 years. He met his wife when she was a student in his class.

== Bridge career ==
Etter is an American Contract Bridge League (ACBL) Grand Life Master. With nearly 19,000 lifetime masterpoints as of February 2015 he ranks 118th and about 90th among living Grand Masters. In 1981 and 1998 he won high-level teams-of-four tournaments that are sometimes called "national championships" in the U.S.

=== Wins ===
- North American Bridge Championships (2)
  - North American Swiss Teams (1) 1981
  - Jacoby Open Swiss Teams (1) 1998

=== Runners-up ===
- North American Bridge Championships (4)
  - North American Men's Swiss Teams (1) 1982
  - Master Mixed Teams (1) 1986
  - Open Pairs II (1) 2006
  - NABC+ Fast Open Pairs (1) 2009
