= Donna Compton =

American bridge player

Donna Compton is an American bridge player. Compton won the World Mixed Pairs Championship in Philadelphia 2010 playing with Fulvio Fantoni from Italy. Compton owns a Bridge club in Dallas with her husband, Chris Compton, who is also a professional bridge player.

Compton often acts at the non playing captain (NPC) for American teams playing in World Championships. Compton was the NPC for USA 2 in the d'Orsi Senior Bowl in Bali in October 2013. Compton's team discovered that a pair from their German opponents were using coughs and other signals to communicate information to the partner. Germany won the final, USA 2 filed a complaint. The German pair was found guilty of cheating, the German team was disqualified and USA 2 was declared the winners.

Compton was the NPC for USA in all of their Buffett Cup appearances (2006, 2008, 2010, 2012).

Compton was the NPC for USA 2, winners of the Bermuda Bowl in 2009.

She is married to Chris Compton.

== Bridge accomplishments ==
=== Wins ===
- World Mixed Pairs Championship (1) 2010
- North American Bridge Championships (1)
  - Chicago Mixed Board-a-Match (1) 2003
