= Peter Gitelman =

Peter Gitelman (Russian: Петр Семенович Гительман; May 29, 1917 in Glusk, Belarus – March 10, 2008 in Montreal) was a Red Army Senior Sergeant who took part in the Battle of Stalingrad during World War II.

He was one of five children in a roving photographer's family. He went to Ukraine to learn a trade and before the war worked in Kiev as an electrical engineer. When he tried to enlist in the Soviet Air Force, he was rejected because he had impaired vision in his left eye.

After the Germans attacked Russia in 1941, Gitelman enlisted in the Red Army. When Stalingrad was attacked, Gitelman was sent to work as a technician in Soviet 833rd Field Hospital.

It was in Stalingrad that he met his wife, Elena Gritsenko, a nurse working in the same field hospital. They married in 1945 and they took part in the Prague Offensive, the last major battle of the war.

He was decorated for bravery following the Soviet offensive against the Germans that claimed more than one million lives during the winter campaign of 1942-1943. He was awarded the Soviet Order of the Patriotic War, 1st class and given medals for taking part in the liberation of Prague, the defence of Stalingrad and the Soviet Victory medal for distinguished military service. On 8 March 1945 he was awarded the Medal for Battle Merit.

He was a Radiographer. After the war, he returned to Kiev and did hospital work until he was well into his 70s. On 21 February 1987 he received the Order of the Patriotic War 2nd class.

In 1992, after the collapse of the Soviet Union, he emigrated to Canada as a refugee. He became a Canadian citizen, but the Canadian government did not recognize his military service record, and did not consider him a war veteran. "Canada, he thought, had forgotten that Russians and Canadian soldiers were allies during the war, fighting the same enemy." "Red Army veterans living in Canada created their own association, but it is little more than a kitchen club. Although he was invited several times to the Russian Embassy to take part in anniversary celebrations, he was ignored by the Canadian department of Veterans affairs."

Gitelman died of complications following hip surgery, at the age of 90, on March 10, 2008 at St. Mary's Hospital, in Montreal.
