= Jim Krekorian =

American bridge player

James E. Krekorian (born 1952) is a professional American bridge player from New York City. He is an options trader and a graduate from Duke University, where he lettered in track.

== Bridge accomplishments ==
=== Awards ===
- Herman Trophy (1) 2006

=== Wins ===
- North American Bridge Championships (6)
  - Blue Ribbon Pairs (1) 1996
  - Nail Life Master Open Pairs (1) 1986
  - North American Pairs (2) 1992, 2009
  - Senior Knockout Teams (1) 2010
  - Mitchell Board-a-Match Teams (1) 1997

=== Runners-up ===
- North American Bridge Championships
  - Blue Ribbon Pairs (1) 2006
  - Jacoby Open Swiss Teams (2) 1986, 1990
  - Vanderbilt (2) 1987, 2005
  - Senior Knockout Teams (1) 2011
  - Mitchell Board-a-Match Teams (1) 2006
