= Oren Kriegel =

American contract bridge player

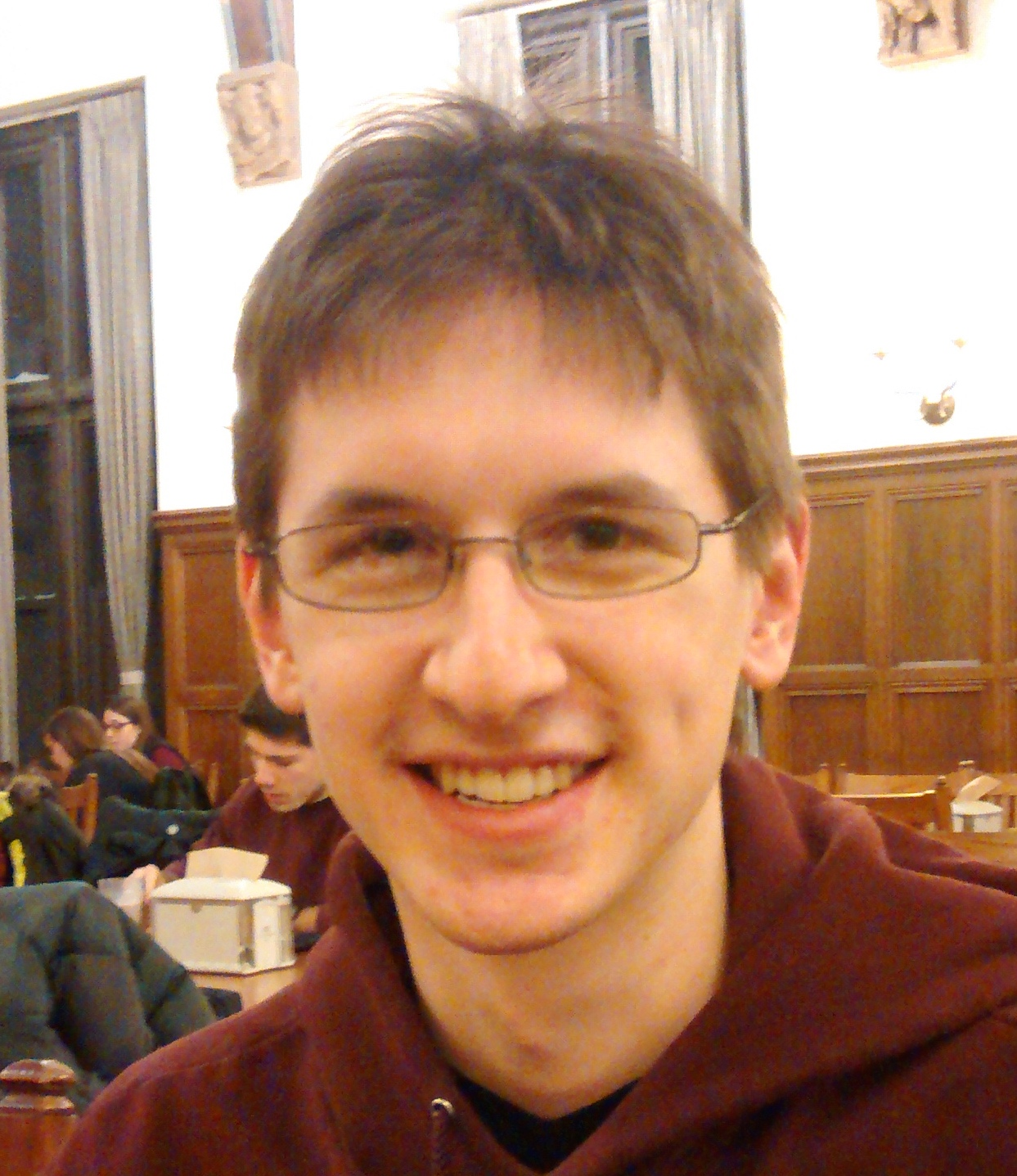
Oren Kriegel in 2015

Oren Kriegel is an American contract bridge player. He was the lead writer on a 189-page report released on November 5, 2020, that looked into the hand records of Giorgio Duboin to determine whether or not Duboin obtained and used unauthorized information during online play.

== Competitions ==
=== World championships ===
In world competitions, he obtained the following results:

World Youth Team Championships
Year	Location	Competition Name	Category	Team	Result
2013	Atlanta, Georgia	3rd World Youth Open Bridge Championships	Under 21 Teams	Jeng	1st
2013	Atlanta, Georgia	3rd World Youth Bridge Open Championships	Under 21 Pairs	Greg Herman (partner)	4th
2014	Istanbul	15th World Youth Bridge Team Championships	Under 21 Teams	USA1	2nd
2015	Opatija, Croatia	4th World Youth Open Bridge Championships	Juniors B-A-M	Cookie Potter	6th
2015	Opatija, Croatia	4th World Youth Open Bridge Championships	Juniors Swiss	Cookie Potter	9th
2015	Opatija, Croatia	4th World Youth Open Bridge Championships	Junior Pairs	Anam Tebha (Partner)	24th
2016	Salsomaggiore, Italy	16th World Youth Team Championships	Under 26 Teams	USA2	11th

=== Domestic Competitions ===
In domestic competitions, Oren has obtained the following results:

North American Collegiate Bridge Championship (1) - 2015

== Sources ==
- "International record for Oren Kriegel". World Bridge Federation.
