= Triple crown of bridge =

Career achievement in duplicate bridge

The triple crown of bridge is a career achievement in duplicate bridge, namely winning the three marquee Open world championships conducted by the World Bridge Federation. The Bermuda Bowl is now contested by national teams in odd-number years. The Olympiad Open Teams, contested by national teams in Olympic years, has been incorporated in the World Mind Sports Games (WMSG). The Olympiad Open Pairs, now World Open Pairs Championship, is contested in non-Olympic even-number years.

The Bermuda Bowl was inaugurated in 1950, eight years before the World Bridge Federation was established with the general purpose to conduct world championships at bridge. There were 23 renditions to 1977, when it became biennial. The Teams and Pairs "Olympiads", as they were both called when inaugurated by the WBF in 1960 and 1962, have always been quadrennial. Pierre Jaïs and Roger Trézel of France won both of the inaugural Olympiads; thus, as 1956 Bermuda Bowl champions, they achieved the triple crown on the earliest possible occasion.

Ten players have accomplished the feat, although two of them (Fantoni and Nunes) were convicted of cheating in 2016 and banned for life from playing with each other. Bold highlights the year each player completed the triple crown.

Triple Crown winners (Open class)
Name	Bermuda Bowl	Olympiad/WMSG Open Teams	World Open Pairs
(France) Pierre Jaïs	1956	1960	1962
(France) Roger Trézel	1956	1960	1962
(United States) Bob Hamman	1970	1988	1974
(United States) Bobby Wolff	1970	1988	1974
(United States) Jeff Meckstroth	1981	1988	1986
(United States) Eric Rodwell	1981	1988	1986
(Brazil) Marcelo Branco	1989	1976	1978
(Brazil) Gabriel Chagas	1989	1976	1990
(Italy) Fulvio Fantoni	2005	2004	2002
(Italy) Claudio Nunes	2005	2004	2002
Bobby Levin	1981	2022	2010

These ten players have all achieved the triple crown playing together, in five partnerships. That need not be so. Indeed, the World Open Pairs is not restricted to entries by two players who are from the same bridge nation, although most entries are from one nation, as are most established partnerships.

Marcelo Branco alone first achieved the triple crown personally before he and one partner achieved it playing together—one year earlier. (Note: Marcelo Branco was the only person to win the World Open Pairs Championship twice in its first 13 renditions from 1962 to 2010, playing with Gabino Cintra in 1978 and Gabriel Chagas in 1990.)

No one has achieved this triple crown in three years, which is possible from any even-number year to the next. Fulvio Fantoni and Claudio Nunes first achieved it in the four-year span, in 2002 and 2004–2005. In 2006, as defending champions in the quadrennial World Open Pairs Championship, a win would have secured "Fantunes" a consecutive triple crown. They finished third, the closest for any pair to defend its Pairs title.

Fulvio Fantoni and Claudio Nunes were later found cheating, and are currently barred from play by multiple bridge associations.

The latest entrant to this list is Bobby Levin - Bermuda bowl in 1981 (partnering Russell Arnold), Open teams in 2022, and open pairs in 2010. The latter two with his current regular partner - Steve Weinstein.

== Women ==
There are parallel events restricted to Women, contested in the same WBF meets. That has been true from the original Olympiad Teams and Pairs tournaments in 1960 and 1962, and from 1985 for the Venice Cup alongside the Bermuda Bowl. The Venice Cup trophy was first contested in 1974, first as a WBF world championship in 1978

A single world championship meet, with events for Open and Women teams, was conducted by the International Bridge League in 1937. Austria was a double winner and one of its women players, Rixi Scharfstein, completed a unique triple crown in the 1960s. Now Rixi Markus of Great Britain, she won the inaugural Olympiad Pairs in 1962 and Olympiad Teams in 1964.

Name	[IBL 1937] Venice Cup	Olympiad/WMSG Women Teams	World Women Pairs
(Austria) Rixi Scharfstein (United Kingdom) Rixi Markus	[1937]	1964	1962

Markus and her regular partner Fritzi Gordon were on the 1976 Great Britain team that finished second for the Venice Cup when it was contested for the second time. They also won the Mixed Teams world championship at the first Olympiad Pairs meet in 1962, an event that was not repeated.

== Bibliography ==
- Manley, Brent; Horton, Mark; Greenberg-Yarbro, Tracey; Rigal, Barry, eds. (2011). The Official Encyclopedia of Bridge - Biographies and Results (compact disk) (7th ed.). Horn Lake, MS: American Contract Bridge League. ISBN 978-0-939460-99-1.
