= Brian Platnick =

American bridge player

Brian Platnick is an American bridge player.

== Biography ==
Platnick was born and raised in Bluefield, West Virginia, in Mercer County, West Virginia. He was taught bridge by his mother and played in tournaments with his brother as his partner throughout his school years.

In 1988, he graduated from Virginia Tech with a Master's degree in engineering. After a brief but successful professional bridge career, he temporarily retired from bridge and attended the Marshall-Wythe School of Law at the College of William & Mary. His full-time career is options trading.

He currently lives in Evanston, Illinois with his wife and two sons and continues to play bridge professionally while working as an options trader.

== Career ==
Platnick, along with his longtime bridge partner John Diamond, were mentored by noted Dallas Aces captain and former president of the American Contract Bridge League (ACBL) Bobby Wolff.

He won his first major tournament victory, the World Junior Teams Championship, in 1991 alongside Diamond. After a 17-year hiatus from the game, Platnick resumed playing professionally as part of a team in the late 2000s, alongside Diamond and a few others.

=== Tournament victories ===
- Rosenblum Cup (1) 2010
- North American Bridge Championships (7)
  - Jacoby Open Swiss Teams (1) 2010
  - Blue Ribbon Pairs (1) 2012
  - Roth Open Swiss Teams (2) 2012, 2015
  - Spingold (3) 2010, 2017, 2025

=== Runners-up ===
- North American Bridge Championships (3)
  - Fast Open Pairs (1) 2008
  - Vanderbilt (3) 2009, 2012,2015
  - Reisinger 2016
