= Fast Open Pairs =

North American bridge (card game) competition

The Fast Open Pairs national bridge championship is held at the summer American Contract Bridge League (ACBL) North American Bridge Championship (NABC).

The Fast Open Pairs is a four session MP pairs event, two qualifying sessions and two final sessions. Each set of two sessions is played on one day. The event typically starts on the second Thursday of the NABC. The event is open. Players are required to play each two board round in eleven minutes. Typically, there is only a small (30–45 minutes) break between the two sessions.

== History ==
The NABC+ Fast Open Pairs is a matchpoint event where tables are permitted 11 minutes to finish their two-board rounds, rather than the standard 15 minutes. The event consists of two qualifying sessions and two final sessions. It was first contested in 2000 in Anaheim, California.

== Winners ==
In the first 16 renditions to 2015, the pair Doug Doub–Adam Wildavsky had one win and two seconds. Geoff Hampson and Chris Willenken both had two wins with different partners.

Fast Open Pairs, 2000 to present
Year	Winners	Runners-up
2000	Aaron Silverstein, Chris Willenken	Linda Lewis, Paul Lewis
2001	Jim Robison, Mark Itabashi	Robert Bell, Earl Glickstein
2002	Alan Kleist, Leo LaSota	Ron Smith, Chris Willenken
2003	John Hurd, Joel Wooldridge	Ed Schulte, Joseph Godefrin
2004	Peter Weiden, Rick Zucker	Doug Doub, Adam Wildavsky
2005	Ralph Buchalter, Chris Willenken	Jiang Gu, Xiaodong Shi
2006	Robert Lebi, Nicolas L'Ecuyer	Doug Doub, Adam Wildavsky
2007	Geoff Hampson, Bobby Levin	Eldad Ginossar, Ron Pachtmann
2008	Doug Doub, Adam Wildavsky	John Diamond, Brian Platnick
2009	Dick Bruno, Peggy Kaplan	Bob Etter, John Hodges
2010	Dan Jacob, Nagy Kamel	Steve Shirey, Allan Stauber
2011	John Diamond, Geoff Hampson	Lew Gamerman, Robert McCaw
2012	Tom Kniest, Ed Schulte	Thomas Bessis, Ishmael Del'Monte
2013	Jim Munday, Larry Sealy	Krzysztof Jassem, Marcin Mazurkiewicz
2014	Adam Grossack, Zachary Grossack	Krzysztof Jassem, Marcin Mazurkiewicz
2015	Igor Savchenko, Irina Kislitsyna	Robert Lebi, Jeff Roman
2016	Marty Nelson, Gil Cohen	Terry Beckman, John Koch
2017	Richard Oshlag, Mark Dahl	Stanford Christie, Dave Westfall
2018	Richard Oshlag, Mark Dahl	Leo LaSota, Brad Theurer
2019	David Yang, Marin Marinov	Richard Oshlag, Mark Dahl
