= Cédric Lorenzini =

French bridge player

Cédric Lorenzini is a French bridge player.

== Bridge accomplishments ==
=== Wins ===
- North American Bridge Championships (1)
  - Norman Kay Platinum Pairs (1) 2015

=== Runners-up ===
- North American Bridge Championships (1)
  - Norman Kay Platinum Pairs (1) 2014
