= Pratap Rajadhyaksha =

American bridge player

Pratap Rajadhyaksha is an American bridge player.

== Bridge accomplishments ==
=== Wins ===
- North American Bridge Championships (4)
  - Blue Ribbon Pairs (1) 2007
  - Reisinger (1) 2002
  - Roth Open Swiss Teams (1) 2011
  - Wernher Open Pairs (1) 2000

=== Runners-up ===
- North American Bridge Championships (4)
  - North American Pairs (1) 1991
  - Grand National Teams (1) 1982
  - Blue Ribbon Pairs (1) 2001
  - Roth Open Swiss Teams (1) 2005
