= Fred Gitelman =

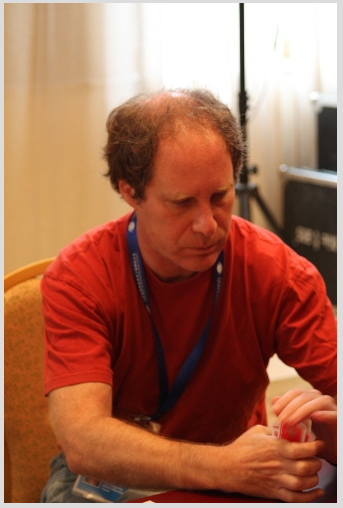
Fred Gitelman (2011)

Frederick "Fred" Gitelman (born February 6, 1965) is a Canadian-American bridge player, developer of bridge software, and a founder of the online bridge platform Bridge Base Online.

== Biography ==
Gitelman has won one world championship, nine North American Bridge Championships, and a gold medal in the 2002 IOC Grand Prix. He was a runner-up in the 1995 Bermuda Bowl as a member of the Canada open team. In 2005 he was named Personality of the Year by the International Bridge Press Association.

Gitelman was born in Toronto, Ontario, Canada. He was a member of the Canadian youth and later open international teams before he moved to Las Vegas, Nevada. He resides there with his wife, Sheri Weinstock, also a well-known bridge player.

He competed for Team Canada at the 1993 Maccabiah Games and 1997 Maccabiah Games in Israel.

He is well known for the educational software he produced through his company Bridge Base Inc. His most recent project is Bridge Base Online (BBO), which he began in 2001, for online bridge play. BBO is one of the most popular bridge-playing sites. He officially retired from Bridge Base Online on July 12, 2019.

== Creativity at the table ==
Gitelman is sometimes recognized for his creativity at the bridge table. In one tournament he discarded an Ace, as a signal to his partner to not lead that suit. His partner led the remaining logical suit which Gitelman, being void, ruffed.

== Books ==
- Master Class: lessons from the bridge table (Toronto: Master Point Press, 2005), 207 pp. OCLC 59876220
- Duplicate Bridge at Home: deals & scoring from Fred Gitelman's Bridge Base Online, Mark Horton and Gitelman (Master Point, 2008), 264 pp. – "commentary by Mark Horton" OCLC 222163432

== Bridge accomplishments ==
=== Awards ===
- ACBL Honorary Member of the Year 2005
- IBPA Personality of the Year Award 2005

=== Wins ===
- World Bridge Championships
  - Rosenblum (1) 2010
- North American Bridge Championships (6)
  - Spingold (2) 2005, 2010
  - Reisinger (1) 2001
  - Open Board-a-Match Teams (1) 1998
  - Jacoby Open Swiss Teams (1) 2003
  - IMP Pairs (1) 2006
- United States Bridge Championships (1)
  - Open Team Trials (1) 2005
- Canadian Championships (2)
  - National Team Championships (2) 1994, 1995
- Other notable wins:
  - Buffett Cup (1) 2006
  - IOC Grand Prix (1) 2002
  - Forbo-Krommenie Nations Cup (1) 2001
  - Cavendish Invitational Teams (1) 2001
  - Cavendish Invitational Pairs (1) 2003

=== Runners-up ===
- Bermuda Bowl (1) 1995
- World Transnational Open Teams (1) 2000
- World Junior Teams (1) 1991
- North American Bridge Championships (7)
  - Vanderbilt (1) 2009
  - Spingold (1) 2000
  - Reisinger (1) 2006
  - Open Board-a-Match Teams (1) 2002
  - Jacoby Open Swiss Teams (1) 2002
  - Life Master Pairs (1) 1999
  - Life Master Open Pairs (1) 2003
- United States Bridge Championships (2)
  - Open Team Trials (2) 2006, 2007
- Other notable 2nd places:
  - Forbo-Krommenie Nations Cup (1) 2002
