= Adam Wildavsky =

American bridge player

Adam Wildavsky (born March 24, 1960) is an American bridge player from Jackson Heights, New York.

Wildavsky began playing bridge while in high school in Oakland, California and continued while he earned a degree in computer science from MIT.

== Bridge accomplishments ==
=== Wins ===
- North American Bridge Championships (5)
  - Lebhar IMP Pairs (1) 2008
  - Fast Open Pairs (1) 2008
  - Blue Ribbon Pairs (2) 1992, 1997
  - Reisinger (1) 2002

=== Runners-up ===
- North American Bridge Championships
  - Lebhar IMP Pairs (1) 1996
  - Fast Open Pairs (2) 2004, 2006
  - Nail Life Master Open Pairs (1) 2011
  - Roth Open Swiss Teams (1) 2010
  - Mitchell Board-a-Match Teams (2) 2009, 2011
