= Pierre Jaïs =

French bridge player and writer (1913–1988)

Pierre Jaïs (13 October 1913 – 24 June 1988) was a French bridge player and writer from Paris. He and his regular partner Roger Trézel were on the France team that won the inaugural World Team Olympiad in Turin, 1960, and they won the inaugural World Open Pairs Championship in Cannes two years later (both competitions are quadrennial). As they had won the 1956 Bermuda Bowl on a French team representing Europe, they were the first to win the so-called Triple Crown of Bridge.

Jaïs and Trézel also won the Sunday Times Invitational Pairs tournament in 1963. On Trézel's death in 1986, the New York Times bridge editor Alan Truscott—a champion British player as a young man during the 1950s—called theirs "one of the greatest partnerships in the history of the game".

They used a canapé system, generally bidding the second-longest suit first, and their becoming one of the world's strongest pairs "demonstrated the effectiveness" of the style.

Jaïs, of Paris, was a physician. He died in 1988 at age 75.

== Works ==
Jaïs wrote in French. At least one of his numerous publications has been published in English-language adaptation.

- Comment gagner au bridge: La partie libre, Pierre Albarran and Jaïs (Paris: R. Juilliard, 1959)
- How to Win at Rubber Bridge (London: Barrie and Rockliff, 1961), 191 pp. – "[Albarran and Jaïs] Adapted for English readers by Terence Reese." OCLC 4381041
