= Roger Trézel =

French bridge player and writer

Roger Trézel (11 May 1918 – 3 November 1986) was a French bridge player and writer. He and his long-time regular partner Pierre Jaïs were the first two of ten players who have won the Triple Crown of Bridge. Their achievement was unique for more than twenty years and they accomplished it on the earliest occasion possible. Having played on the France team that won the 1956 Bermuda Bowl representing Europe against the United States, they won the inaugural renditions of both premier World Bridge Federation quadrennial events, the 1960 World Team Olympiad and the 1962 World Open Pairs Championship. Trézel and Jaïs also won the Sunday Times Invitational pairs tournament in 1963.

They used a canapé system, generally bidding the second-longest suit first, and their becoming one of the world's strongest pairs "demonstrated the effectiveness" of the style. Their partnership was terminated only by Trézel's late 1986 death in France. Alan Truscott then called it "one of the greatest partnerships in the history of the game" and two years later asserted that many European cognoscenti of 30 years earlier would have called them the "world's greatest partnership".

Trézel wrote several bridge books, including the Master Bridge Series with Terence Reese.

Born in Orléans, France to Pierre Trézel and Marie Prunier, he died in Paris at the age of 68.

== Publications with Terence Reese ==
Those Extra Chances in Bridge

- 1978: Frederick Fell Publishers (New York), 64p., ISBN 978-0-88391-077-1
- 1978: Ward Lock (London), 64p., ISBN 978-0-7063-5610-6
- 1978, 1986: Victor Gollancz (London) in association with Peter Crawley, 64p., ISBN 978-0-575-02634-6

Master the Odds in Bridge

- 1979, 1986: Victor Gollancz (London) in association with Peter Crawley, Master Bridge Series, 79p., ISBN 978-0-575-02597-4
- 1979: F. Fell (New York), 79p., ISBN 978-0-88391-094-8

Snares and Swindles in Bridge

- 1976: Frederick Fell Publishers (New York), Master Bridge Series, 64p., ISBN 978-0-88391-071-9
- 1976: Ward Lock (London), 64p., ISBN 978-0-7063-5310-5
- 1979, 1986: Victor Gollancz (London) in association with Peter Crawley, 64p., ISBN 978-0-575-02633-9

The Art of Defense in Bridge

- 1979: Frederick Fell Publishers (New York), Master Bridge Series, 79p., ISBN 978-0-88391-093-1
- 1979, 1988: Victor Gollancz (London) in association with Peter Crawley, 79p., ISBN 978-0-575-02598-1

Imaginative Cardplay

- 2014: Master Point Press (Toronto). 248p. ISBN 978-1-77140-015-2. This publication is a compendium of the four above-noted, each revised and updated.

Elimination Play in Bridge

- 1976: Frederick Fell Publishers (New York), Master Bridge Series, 77p., ISBN 978-0-88391-070-2
- 1976: Ward Lock (London), 77p., ISBN 978-0-7063-5323-5
- 1979, 1986: Victor Gollancz (London) in association with Peter Crawley, 77p., ISBN 978-0-575-02632-2

When to Duck When to Win in Bridge

- 1978: Frederick Fell Publishers (New York), 64p., ISBN 978-0-88391-078-8
- 1978: Ward Lock (London), 64p., ISBN 978-0-7063-5612-0
- 1978, 1988: Victor Gollancz (London) in association with Peter Crawley, 64p., ISBN 978-0-575-02635-3

Blocking and Unblocking Plays in Bridge

- 1976: Frederick Fell Publishers (New York), Master Bridge Series, 64p., ISBN 978-0-88391-084-9
- 1976: Ward Lock (London), 64p., ISBN 978-0-7063-5189-7, ISBN 978-0-7063-5191-0
- 1976, 1979: Victor Gollancz (London) in association with Peter Crawley, 64p., ISBN 978-0-575-02749-7

Safety Plays in Bridge

- 1976: Frederick Fell Publishers (New York), Master Bridge Series, 63p., ISBN 978-0-88391-083-2
- 1976: Ward Lock (London), 63p., ISBN 978-0-7063-5084-5, ISBN 978-0-7063-5200-9
- 1976, 1990: Victor Gollancz (London) in association with Peter Crawley, 63p., ISBN 978-0-575-02631-5, ISBN 978-0-575-02748-0

Accurate Cardplay

- 2014: Master Point Press (Toronto). 232p. ISBN 978-1-77140-014-5. This publication is a compendium of the four above-noted, each revised and updated.

The Mistakes You Make at Bridge

- 1984, 1989: Victor Gollancz (London) in association with Peter Crawley, Master Bridge Series, 168p., ISBN 978-0-575-03424-2, ISBN 978-0-575-03409-9
- 1992: Reprint: Houghton Mifflin (Boston) in association with Peter Crawley, ISBN 978-0-395-62891-1
- 1994: New Edition: Gollancz (London), 168p., ISBN 978-0-575-05785-2
- 2006: Revised edition by Ron Klinger: Cassell (London) in association with Peter Crawley, 160p., ISBN 978-0-304-36811-2
