= Eldad Ginossar =

Professional bridge player

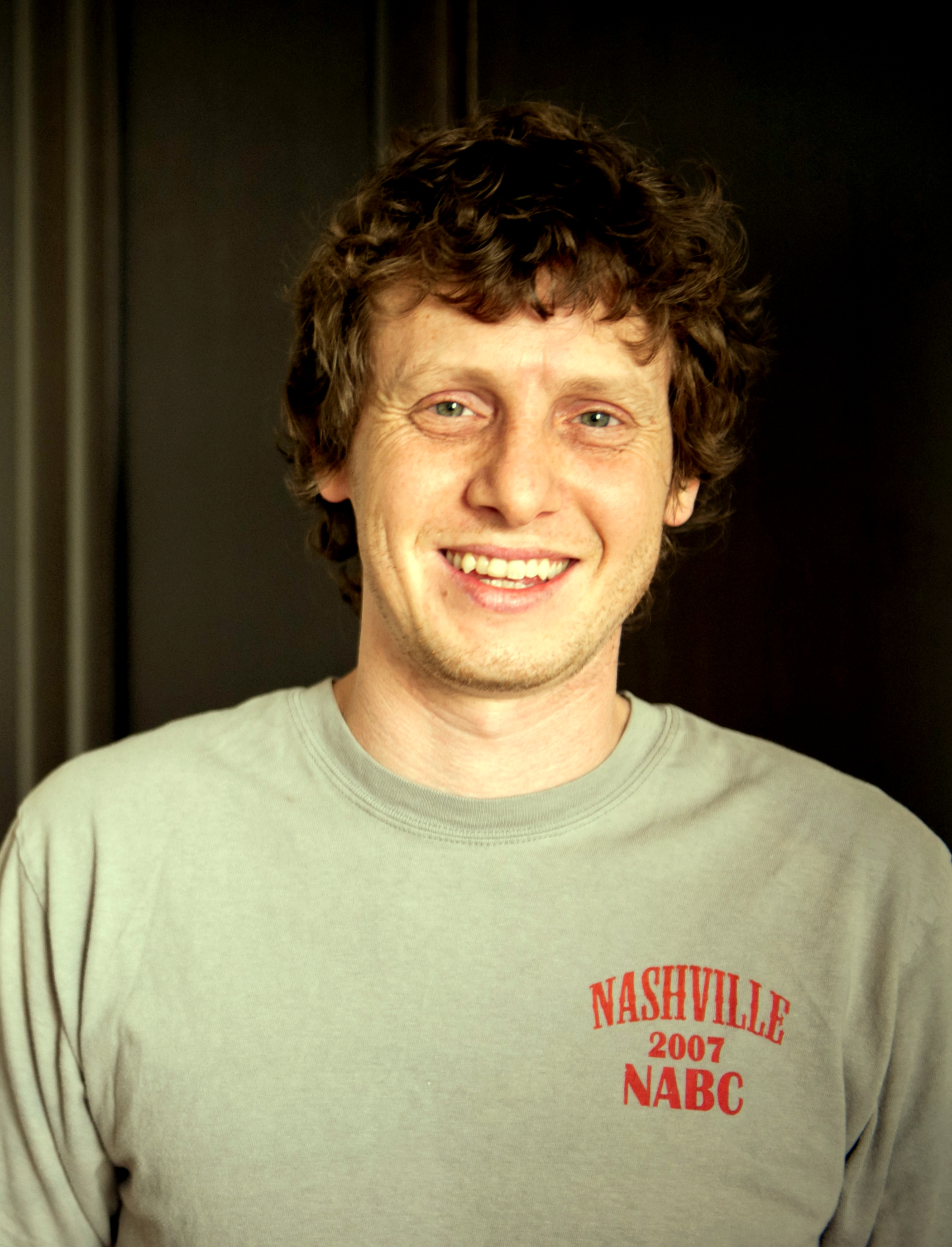
Eldad Ginossar (2011)

Eldad Ginossar (Hebrew: אלדד גינוסר; born 14 June 1981) is a professional bridge player from Israel.

Ginossar won the European Open Teams Championship in Antalya, Turkey in June 2007 with his partner Ron Pachtman, and with the French father-son combination of Michel and Thomas Bessis as teammates.

Ginossar won both the Israeli Open Pairs Championship and the Israeli IMP pairs championship in 2007, completing an unprecedented series of victories in a single year. His greatest achievement so far in the world championship play is a 3rd-place finish in the Rosenblum Cup in 2006.

He manages a bridge club in Kfar Saba, Israel.
