= Jacoby Open Swiss Teams =

North American bridge championship

The Jacoby Open Swiss Teams national bridge championship is held at the spring American Contract Bridge League (ACBL) North American Bridge Championship (NABC).

The Jacoby Open Swiss Teams is a four session Swiss Teams event with two qualifying and two final sessions. The event typically starts on the second Saturday of the NABC. The event is open.

== History ==
The Jacoby Open Swiss Teams is a four-session event --- consisting of two qualifying sessions and two final sessions—with the Jacoby Trophy going to the winners.

The event began in 1982 and was then named the North American Men's Swiss Teams. In 1990, it was changed to become the Open Swiss with the Jacoby Trophy awarded to the winners.

The trophy is named for Oswald and Jim Jacoby --- one of the premier father-son pairs in ACBL history, the first father-son to win a national championship together and the first father-son to be elected to the ACBL Bridge Hall of Fame.

The senior Jacoby, Oswald Jacoby, (1902–1984) won his first major title --- the National Team Championship of the American Whist League --- in 1929 and his last major title --- the Reisinger Board-a-Match Teams --- in 1983.

In between, he won the McKenney Trophy (now the Barry Crane Top 500) four times. He was the first player to win 1,000 masterpoints in a single year and the first player to earn 10,000 masterpoints.

Jacoby won seven Spingolds, seven Vanderbilts, two Reisingers and more than a dozen other major titles. He was named to the ACBL Bridge Hall of Fame in 1965.

He and son Jim are the co-authors of Jacoby Transfer Bids, Jacoby 2NT and other bidding ideas. Together, they won the Reisinger in 1955 --- when Jim was 22 --- and the Vanderbilt in 1965. Jim Jacoby (1933–1991), elected to the Hall of Fame in 1997, won the Bermuda Bowl in 1970 and 1971, the World Mixed Teams in 1972 and the World Team Olympiad in 1988. He won more than 14 NABC titles and captured the Barry Crane Top 500 in 1988 --- the same year he won the Olympiad title.

He is one of only three players to win the masterpoint title and a world championship in the same year --- Charles Goren won the Bermuda Bowl and the McKenney in 1950 while Barry Crane won the World Mixed Pairs and the McKenney in 1978.

== Winners ==
Winners of North American Men's Swiss Teams (1982–1989)
Year	Winners	Runners-up
1982	Allan Stauber, Jan Janitschke, Ross Grabel, Mike Smolen	2-3. Si Frome, Marc Renson, Hamish Bennett, Bob Etter; 2-3. Jim Robison, Stelios Touchtidis, Jon Wittes, Steve Cohen, Paul Ivaska, Paul Lewis
1983	Mike Albert, Ira Rubin, Grant Baze, Barry Crane	George Ateljevich, Sidney Lazard, Sidney Lazard Jr., John Zilic, Norb Kremer
1984	Bart Bramley, Mark Cohen, Milt Rosenberg, Ralph Katz	Tom Mahaffey, Andy Bernstein, Richard Pavlicek, Bill Passell, Bill Root
1985	John Devine, Alan Sontag, John Mohan, Roger Bates	David Ashley, David Sacks, Mike Shuman, Ed Davis, Jon Wittes, Steve Cohen
1986	Mark Cohen, Peter Boyd, Steve Robinson, Kit Woolsey	Bob Jones, Jim Krekorian, Ethan Stein, Drew Casen, Al Rand
1987	Eddie Kantar, Alan Sontag, Roger Bates, John Mohan, John Devine	Claude Vogel, David Lehman, Tom Fox, Michael Schreiber
1988	Ron Sukoneck, Doug Fraser, Kamel Fergani, Bill Pettis	Jim Jacoby, Gerald Michaud, Bobby Nail, Fred Hamilton, Walt Walvick, Erik Paulsen
1989	Jim Mahaffey, Ron Andersen, Paul Soloway, Bobby Goldman, Jeff Meckstroth, Eric Rodwell	2-3. Rob Stevens, Ron Powell, Sidney Brownstein, Mark Singer; 2-3. Jan Janitschke, Craig Janitschke, Marc Jacobus, Peter Nagy, Joey Silver

Winners of Jacoby Open Swiss Teams (1990–)
Year	Winners	Runners-up
1990	John Sutherlin, Bart Bramley, Gerald Michaud, Larry Richardson, Bob Hamman	Grant Baze, Jim Krekorian, Drew Casen, Mike Smolen
1991	George Rosenkranz, Eddie Wold, Mark Lair, Mike Passell, Paul Soloway, Bobby Goldman	Bart Bramley, Per Olof Sundelin, John Sutherlin, Dan Morse, Edgar Kaplan, Norman Kay
1992	Richard Schwartz, Drew Casen, Michael Seamon, Richard Pavlicek, Fred Stewart, Steve Weinstein	Morris Chang, Bob Hamman, Bobby Wolff, Michael Rosenberg, Zia Mahmood
1993	Tony Kasday, Michael Seamon, Steve Sion, Billy Cohen, Ron Smith	Martin Scheinberg, Benito Garozzo, Lea Dupont, Billy Eisenberg
1994	Perry Johnson, Jeff Meckstroth, Chip Martel, Eric Rodwell	Grant Baze, Tipton Golias, Hugh Ross, Bart Bramley, Mike Lawrence
1995	Ralph Cohen, Billy Cohen, Peter Nagy, George Mittelman, Marty Sklar, Hugh Ross	Mark Feldman, Jim Looby, Sharon Osberg, Cameron Doner
1996	Jimmy Cayne, Björn Fallenius, Brian Glubok, Chuck Burger, Mats Nilsland, Mike Passell	Paul Hackett, Jason Hackett, Justin Hackett, Brigitte Mavromichalis
1997	Edgar Kaplan, Norman Kay, Brian Glubok, Bart Bramley, Walter Schafer Jr., Geir Helgemo	Varis Carey, Nicolas L'Ecuyer, Jeffrey Blond, Michael Shuster, Curtis Cheek, Michael Schreiber
1998	Edith Rosenkranz, Ralph Cohen, Ron Smith, Bob Etter, Bob Morris	Eddie Wold, George Rosenkranz, Magnus Magnusson, Jon Baldursson, Berry Westra, Henri Leufkens
1999	Sam Lev, Brian Glubok, Michael Polowan, John Mohan, Barnet Shenkin	Grant Baze, Tipton Golias, Krzysztof Martens, Marek Szymanowski, Adam Żmudziński, Cezary Balicki
2000	Mike Cappelletti Jr., Gary Cohler, Mark Lair, Richard Finberg	Rose Meltzer, Peter Weichsel, Alan Sontag, Kyle Larsen, Chip Martel, Lew Stansby
2001	George Jacobs, Ralph Katz, Alfredo Versace, Lorenzo Lauria, Norberto Bocchi, Giorgio Duboin	Gerald Sosler, Kay Schulle, Massimo Lanzarotti, Andrea Buratti, Antonio Sementa, Benito Garozzo
2002	Perry Johnson, Jeff Meckstroth, Eric Rodwell, Paul Soloway	Brad Moss, Roy Welland, Björn Fallenius, Fred Gitelman, Steve Garner, Howard Weinstein
2003	Peter Bertheau, Fredrik Nystrom, Christal Henner-Welland, Fulvio Fantoni, Claudio Nunes, Fred Gitelman	Eddie Wold, Mike Passell, George Rosenkranz, Geoff Hampson, Eric Greco
2004	Jacek Pszczoła, Michał Kwiecień, Piotr Gawryś, Sam Lev, Michael Polowan, Chris Willenken	Peter Bertheau, Christal Henner-Welland, Fulvio Fantoni, Claudio Nunes, Michael Kamil, Fredrik Nystrom
2005	James Cayne, Michael Seamon, Geir Helgemo, Tor Helness, Robert Levin, Steve Weinstein	Perry Johnson, Jeff Meckstroth, Paul Soloway, Eric Rodwell
2006	Bob Hamman, Robert Levin, Jeff Meckstroth, Eric Rodwell, Paul Soloway, Steve Weinstein	Lou Ann O'Rourke, Marc Jacobus, Giorgio Duboin, Norberto Bocchi, Peter Fredin, Magnus Lindkvist
2007	Kalin Karaivanov, Marin Marinov, David Maidman, Roumen Trendafilov	Peter Fredin, Michael Moss, Brian Glubok, Agustin Madala
2008	Perry Johnston, Chris Compton, Jeff Meckstroth, Eric Rodwell	Robert Hollman, Bruce Ferguson, Jerry Clerkin, Dennis Clerkin, Krzysztof Buras, Grzegorz Narkiewicz
2009	Jeff Meckstroth, Eric Rodwell, Bob Hamman, Zia Mahmood	Lou Ann O'Rourke, Marc Jacobus, Espen Lindqvist, Boye Brogeland, Giorgio Duboin, Antonio Sementa
2010	John Diamond, Fred Gitelman, Brian Platnick, Brad Moss, Eric Greco, Geoff Hampson	Jeff Meckstroth, Eric Rodwell, Bob Hamman, Zia Mahmood
2011	Greg Hinze, Jacob Morgan, Dan Morse, Michael Polowan, Steve Shirey, David Yang	Roger Bates, Sjoert Brink, Bas Drijver, Marc Jacobus, Lou Ann O'Rourke, Eddie Wold
2012	Gaylor Kasle, Larry Kozlove, Peter Boyd, Steve Robinson, Fred Stewart, Kit Woolsey	Michael Askgaard, Kasper Konow, Gregers Bjarnarson, Anders Hagen
2013	Richard Schwartz, Allan Graves, Thorlakur Johnsson, Espen Lindqvist, Boye Brogeland, Jon Baldursson	Jim Mahaffey, Tony Forrester, Piotr Gawrys, Alexander Smirnov, Sam Lev, Josef Piekarek
2014	Sabine Auken, Roy Welland, Josef Piekarek, Christina Madsen, Alexander Smirnov	Martin Fleisher, Steve Garner, Zia Mahmood, Chris Willenken, Michael Rosenberg, Chip Martel
2015	Richard Schwartz, Allan Graves, Ron Schwartz, Lotan Fisher, Boye Brogeland, Espen Lindqvist	Tom Hanlon, Leslie Amoils, Brad Moss, Joe Grue, Fred Gitelman, Justin Lall
2016	Richard Schwartz, Allan Graves, Daniel Korbel, Huub Bertens, Boye Brogeland, Espen Lindqvist	Jeff Meckstroth, Eric Rodwell, Robert Levin, Steve Weinstein
2017	Tim Verbeek, Danny Molenaar, Bob Drijver, Bart Nab, Dano De Falco, Patricia Cayne	Noberto Bocchi, Alejandro Bianchedi, Dennis Bilde, Giorgio Duboin, Agustin Madala, Antonio Sementa

== Sources ==
"NABC Winners". acbl.com. ACBL.

List of previous winners, Page 11 Daily Bulletin (PDF), vol. 52–9, March 21, 2009, archived from the original (PDF) on November 17, 2010

2009 winners, Page 1 Daily Bulletin (PDF), vol. 52–11, March 23, 2009
