= John Diamond (bridge) =

American bridge player

John Diamond (born 1966) is an American bridge player. Diamond won a world championship in 2010 and has won 6 North American Bridge Championships, and is often partnered with his longtime friend and fellow bridge player Brian Platnick.

Diamond is from Daytona Beach, Florida. He graduated from Duke University and University of Maryland.

== Bridge accomplishments ==
=== Wins ===
- Rosenblum Cup (1) 2010
- North American Bridge Championships (6)
  - Fast Open Pairs (1) 2011
  - Silodor Open Pairs (1) 2014
  - Blue Ribbon Pairs (1) 2012
  - Jacoby Open Swiss Teams (1) 2010
  - Roth Open Swiss Teams (1) 2012
  - Spingold (2) 2010, 2017

=== Runners-up ===
- North American Bridge Championships (4)
  - Fast Open Pairs (1) 2008
  - Nail Life Master Open Pairs (1) 2008
  - Vanderbilt (2) 2009, 2012
