= Pierre Albarran =

French tennis player and bridge player

Olympic medal record

Tennis
Bronze medal – third place	1920 Antwerp	Doubles

Pierre Henri Maurice Albarran (18 May 1893 – 24 February 1960) was a French auction and contract bridge player and theorist, and a tennis player. It has been reported that he was born in the West Indies, and also in Chaville, Hauts-de-Seine, France. He died in Paris.

== Bridge ==
... probably the greatest Contract Bridge player in Europe ...

— Lt. Col. H. M. Beasley, D.S.O., The Beasley Contract Bridge System

At the bridge table, Albarran played on the France open team that won the European IBL Championship in 1935 and on the slightly different team that traveled to New York City late that year for a match that may be considered the first world team championship. He subsequently represented France in more than 30 international bridge competitions and won 19 national titles. His contributions to bidding systems include the canapé approach and the convention later called Roman two-suiters. Upon his death, Albert H. Morehead observed that Albarran was almost unknown in America, "but it is possible that M. Albarran's bidding theories influenced European bridge tactics more than the theories of any other authority in any other country." After France won the inaugural World Team Olympiad three months later, Morehead wrote that an American visitor to a French bridge club would find one big difference in the bridge language, the canapé bidding advocated by Albarran and "adopted by millions of players throughout Europe".

== Tennis ==
On the tennis court, he played for France in two Davis Cup tournaments. He won the bronze medal in doubles with Max Decugis at the 1920 Summer Olympics in Antwerp. With partner Alain Gerbault he reached the doubles final of the World Hard Court Championships in 1921.

=== World Championships finals ===
==== Doubles (1 runner-up) ====
Result	Year	Championship	Surface	Partner	Opponents	Score
Loss	1921	World Hard Court Championships	Clay	(France) Alain Gerbault	(France) André Gobert (France) William Laurentz	4–6, 2–6, 8–6, 2–6

== Publications ==
- Bridge, Nouvelle methode de nomination. Les jeux bicolores. Le Canapé, 1946
- Cent donnes extraordinaires: Bridge, 1953, co-author José Le Dentu
- Comment Gagner Au Bridge, 1959, co-author Pierre Jaïs
- L'Encyclopédie du bridge moderne, vol 1. 1957 and vol. 2 1968
- Le Bridge pour Tous, 1949, co-author Robert de Nexon, Publisher: A. Fayard, Paris, LC: 49052576
- Le Nouveau Bridge Pour Tous, 1958, co-authors Robert de Nexon and José Le Dentu
- Notre Methode de Bridge, 1936, co-author Robert de Nexon
- Nouveau Memento de Bridge en 100 Lecons: Encheres Naturelles, 1976, co-author José Le Dentu, Publisher: A. Fayard, Paris, ISBN 2-213-00396-3, LC: 77576798
