= Mott-Smith Trophy =

North American Bridge trophy

The Mott-Smith Trophy, named for writer and cryptographer Geoffrey Mott-Smith, is awarded to the player with the best overall individual performance in the Spring Nationals, the spring event of the American Contract Bridge League (ACBL) North American Bridge Championship (NABC).

== History ==
The Mott-Smith Trophy was donated in 1961 by friends of Geoffrey Mott-Smith and was made retroactive to include all the winners from 1958.

== Namesake ==
Geoffrey Arthur Mott-Smith (1902–1960) was the second son of Harold Mead Mott-Smith (1872–1978) and Jennie Ormsby Yates (1874–1941) and a grandson of John Mott-Smith. He became co-chairman of the ACBL Laws Commission, editor of the ACBL Bridge Bulletin 1935–36, a contributor to The Bridge World, a writer and cryptographer. During World War II, Mott-Smith served as chief instructor for the OSS in the training of cryptographers and cryptanalysts. He wrote or co-wrote more than 29 books on games and served as games consultant for the Association of American Playing Card Manufacturers.

== Winners ==
Boldface numerals represent a record-breaking number of masterpoints.

Mott-Smith Trophy
Year	Winners	Masterpoints
1958	Ivar Stakgold	n/a
1959	Lew Mathe	n/a
1960	Norman Kay	n/a
1961	Robert Jordan	n/a
1962	Robert Jordan	n/a
1963	Sidney Silodor, Norman Kay	n/a
1964	Lew Mathe	n/a
1965	Phil Feldesman	n/a
1966	Phil Feldesman	n/a
1967	Lew Mathe	n/a
1968	Norman Kay	n/a
1969	Sue Sachs	168
1970	Barry Crane	155
1971	Barry Crane	135
1972	Paul Swanson, Jack Blair	159
1973	Bobby Wolff	**233**
1974	Ron Andersen	**250**
1975	Roger Bates	203
1976	Larry T. Cohen	225
1977	Mark Blumenthal	200
1978	Mike Passell	**250**
1979	Jeff Meckstroth	215
1980	Jeff Meckstroth, Eric Rodwell	173
1981	Allan Stauber	166
1982	David Berkowitz, Harold Lilie	198
1983	Mike Passell	214
1984	Lew Stansby	172
1985	Jeff Meckstroth	196
1986	Lew Stansby	207
1987	Steve Robinson, Peter Boyd	200
1988	Roger Bates	193
1989	Eddie Wold	167
1990	John Sutherlin	**300**
1991	Zia Mahmood	183
1992	Roger Bates	186
1993	Michael Seamon	196
1994	Chip Martel	250
1995	Michael Polowan	242
1996	Zia Mahmood	252
1997	Bart Bramley	292
1998	Eddie Wold	243
1999	Petra Hamman	265
2000	Jeff Meckstroth	**313**
2001	Jill Meyers	234
2002	Paul Soloway	**357.41**
2003	Geoff Hampson	317.42
2004	Fulvio Fantoni, Claudio Nunes	**363.82**
2005	Eddie Wold	282.05
2006	Fred Chang	347.50
2007	Roy Welland	**380.00**
2008	Krzysztof Jassem, Krzysztof Martens	257.50
2009	Jeff Meckstroth	304.92
2010	Tor Helness	320.59
2011	Joel Wooldridge	**454.31**
2012	Thomas Bessis, Ishamel Delmonte	400.00
2013	Mike Kamil	342.58
2014	Bobby Levin	450.00
2015	Cedric Lorenzini	284.24
2016	Geoff Hampson, Eric Greco	315.71
2017	Jeff Meckstroth	400.00
2018	Bobby Levin, Steve Weinstein	380.00
2019	Steve Garner	304.51
2020	No NABC Held	
2021	No NABC Held	
2022	Michael Rosenberg, Zachary Grossack	405.00
2023	Greg Humphreys	291.24

== See also ==
- Fishbein Trophy
- Goren Trophy

== Sources ==
- List of previous winners, Page 6. Daily Bulletin (PDF), vol. 49, April 5, 2006
- 2006 winner, Page 1. Daily Bulletin (PDF), vol. 49, April 10, 2006
- 2007 winner, Page 1. Daily Bulletin (PDF), vol. 50, March 19, 2007
- 2008 winners, Page 1. Daily Bulletin (PDF), vol. 51, March 17, 2008
- 2009 winner, Page 3. Daily Bulletin (PDF), vol. 52, March 23, 2009
- 2010 winner, Page 2. Daily Bulletin (PDF), vol. 53, March 22, 2010
- 2011 winner, Spring 2011 NABC Final Results
- 2012 winner, Page 4. Daily Bulletin (PDF), vol. 55, March 26, 2012
- 2013 winner, Page 1. Daily Bulletin (PDF), vol. 56, March 25, 2013
- 2014 winner, Page 4. Daily Bulletin (PDF), vol. 57, March 31, 2014
- 2015 winner, Page 1. Daily Bulletin (PDF), vol. 58, March 23, 2015
- 2016 winner, Page 1. Daily Bulletin (PDF), vol. 59, March 21, 2016
- 2017 winner, Page 1. Daily Bulletin (PDF), vol. 60, March 20, 2017
- Mott-Smith, Geoffrey, Philip D. Morehead and Albert H. Morehead (2001). Hoyle's Rules of Games. Penguin. ISBN 9781101100233
