= Bob Hamman =

American bridge player (born 1938)

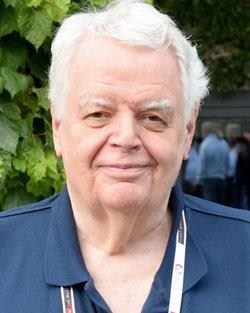
- Hamman in 2022
- Born: Robert David Hamman; August 6, 1938 (age 87); Pasadena, California, U.S.
- Known for: Professional bridge player

Robert David Hamman (born August 6, 1938) is an American professional bridge player. He is considered to be one of the greatest bridge players of all time. He is from Dallas, Texas.

Hamman and Bobby Wolff played as partners for nearly three decades on teams that challenged for major trophies in North America and often for world championships. Representing the United States (from about 1980, previously North America) they won eight world championships for national teams, the 1988 World Team Olympiad and seven Bermuda Bowls spanning 1970 to 1995. For the last they were members of Nick Nickell's professional team, where Hamman remained a fixture through the current two-year cycle (Note: The current cycle for major professional teams in the United States covers 2011 and 2012 world championships, which are contested in the second half of the calendar year. New commitments begin in July but do not interfere with the world stage of the previous cycle. "Rosenberg-Willenken Joining Fleisher in 2012" by Martin Fleisher (2011-07-13). Bridge Winners. Retrieved 2011-07-15. See the clarification by Fleisher in the comments.) and won three more Bermuda Bowls in partnership with Paul Soloway and Zia Mahmood.

Beginning 2012/2013, Nickell has replaced Bob Hamman and Zia Mahmood with Bobby Levin–Steve Weinstein. A new pairing for Hamman with Bart Bramley was announced in July but never secured, according to a November report that Hamman will play with Justin Lall. Justin was a silver medalist in the 2011 Bermuda Bowl and is the son of Hemant Lall, Hamman's partner in 2007.

Bob Hamman is known to promote young talent. He played with Finn Kolesnik and Jacob Freeman playing the NABC with them.

Bob Hamman also played with a very young player 13-year old World Champion from India Anshul Bhatt and had great things to say about the young man saying in humor “Well done. I am glad that my opponents are not as tough as Anshul.”. Bhatt also quoted Bob Hamman in his TED talk "Bridge-A Game for Life".

== Bridge career ==
Hamman first qualified for a world championship in the open category by winning the American Contract Bridge League international trials in 1963, for the 1964 World Team Olympiad. That was a "pairs trial" from which the winning pair and two of the three runners-up would be selected as a 6-person team.

Dallas businessman Ira Corn established the first full-time professional team in 1968, the Dallas Aces, later simply Aces. Hamman joined in 1969, as the sixth player, and established a partnership with Billy Eisenberg. Following the retirement of Italy's Blue team, they won the 1970 Bermuda Bowl as North America representative and repeated in 1971 as defending champion. He has won 12 world championships and 50 North American championships. Hamman and Brent Manley wrote his autobiography At the Table: My Life and Times, published in 1994 (ISBN 0-9642584-1-2). He was inducted into the ACBL Hall of Fame in 1999; a version of his citation that reports 23,219 masterpoints to March 2001 also reads:

"One of the world's greatest players, ranks #1 among WBF [World Bridge Federation] Grand Masters, also ranks 1st in world performance over past 10 years. Member ACBL Hall of Fame. Has been highest ranked player in the world since 1985."

Hamman's most unusual accomplishment may be eight wins in the ACBL's most important pair championships (Blue Ribbon Pairs, Life Master Pairs and Men's Pairs) with eight different partners. He won the World Open Pairs once, with Bobby Wolff in 1974, and he was second in 1994 with Michael Rosenberg.

Probably his most popular and emotional win, other than the 1970 Bermuda Bowl, was the annual Vanderbilt Trophy, the oldest open teams event in North America, in 2000. Despite myriad other wins, Hamman had not won the Vanderbilt since 1973. His partner Paul Soloway was severely ill, commuting between the tournament site and the hospital, and literally came out of his sickbed to play the final quarter of the quarterfinal match; they won that session by 34 IMPs to win the match by 1. On the final board, Hamman and Soloway had a bidding misunderstanding to reach a very poor 6H contract, but their opponents could not work out declarer's hand due to the unusual auction, and the contract made, providing the margin of victory.

Hamman's Law is the maxim, "If you have a choice of reasonable bids and one of them is 3NT, then bid it."

== Prize coverage business ==
Hamman founded SCA Promotions in 1986. The company offers a form of insurance where they cover the prize money for large competitions, initially focusing on hole-in-one prizes in golf. In 2015, SCA was able to retrieve money from Lance Armstrong that had been paid to cover prize money.

He was portrayed by Dustin Hoffman in the 2015 film The Program, dealing with Lance Armstrong's career and downfall.

== Bridge accomplishments ==
=== Honors ===
- ACBL Hall of Fame, 1999
- ACBL Honorary Member of the Year 1991

=== Awards ===
- ACBL Player of the Year 1990, 1993, 2006
- Fishbein Trophy 1969, 1983
- Herman Trophy 1978, 1988, 1993
- Precision Award (Best Defended Hand of the Year) 1986, 1993

=== Wins ===
- Bermuda Bowl (10) 1970, 1971, 1977, 1983, 1985, 1987, 1995, 2000, 2003, 2009
- World Open Team Olympiad (1) 1988
- World Open Pairs (1) 1974
- d'Orsi Senior Bowl World Zonal Team Championship (1) 2015
- World Senior Team Championship (1) 2016
- North American Bridge Championships (54)
  - Vanderbilt (6) 1964, 1966, 1971, 1973, 2000, 2003
  - Spingold (15) 1969, 1979, 1982, 1983, 1989, 1990, 1993, 1994, 1995, 1996, 1998, 1999, 2004, 2006, 2007
  - Chicago (now Reisinger) (1) 1962
  - Reisinger (11) 1970, 1978, 1979, 1988, 1993, 1994, 1995, 2004, 2005, 2008, 2009
  - Grand National Teams (4) 1975, 1977, 1986, 2006
  - Open Board-a-Match Teams (2) 2008, 2019
  - Men's Board-a-Match Teams (1) 1988
  - Jacoby Open Swiss Teams (3) 1990, 2006, 2009
  - Master Mixed Teams (1) 1987
  - Blue Ribbon Pairs (4) 1964, 1986, 1991, 1993
  - Life Master Pairs (3) 1980, 1983, 1992
  - Platinum Pairs (1) 2012
  - Senior Knockout Teams (1) (2016)
  - Men's Pairs (1) 1986
- United States Bridge Championships (18)
  - Open Team Trials (17) 1969, 1971, 1973, 1977, 1979 (Dec), 1982, 1984, 1985, 1987, 1988, 1992, 1998, 2001, 2002, 2004, 2007, 2008, 2012
  - Open Pair Trials (1) 1963
- Other notable wins:
  - Buffett Cup (4) 2006, 2010, 2012, 2019
  - Cavendish Invitational Pairs (1) 1998

=== Runners-up ===
- Bermuda Bowl (6) 1966, 1973, 1974, 1975, 1997, 2005
- World Open Team Olympiad (4) 1964, 1972, 1980, 1992
- World Open Pairs (1) 1994
- World Mixed Pairs (2) 1986, 1994
- North American Bridge Championships (19)
  - Vanderbilt (5) 1968, 1970, 1981, 1996, 2002
  - Spingold (1) 1970
  - Reisinger (1) 1968
  - Open Board-a-Match Teams (2) 1998, 1999
  - Men's Board-a-Match Teams (4) 1969, 1980, 1984, 1989
  - Jacoby Open Swiss Teams (1) 1992
  - Life Master Men's Pairs (2) 1980, 1981
  - Open Pairs (1) 1988
  - Open Pairs I (1) 1999
  - Men's Pairs (1) 1985
- United States Bridge Championships (3)
  - Open Team Trials (2) 1979 (Jan), 1997
  - Open Pair Trials (1) 1965
- Other notable 2nd places:
  - Buffett Cup (1) 2008
  - Forbo-Krommenie Nations Cup (1) 1997
  - Cavendish Invitational Teams (1) 1997
  - Sunday Times–Macallan Invitational Pairs (1) 1992
  - Pamp World Par Contest (1) 1990

== Publications ==
- ——; Manley, Brent (1994). At the Table: My Life and Times (1st ed.). Memphis, TN: DBM Publications. ISBN 0-9642584-0-4. LCCN 94-67897.
