= Cavendish Invitational =

High-stakes bridge tournament currently held in Monaco

The Cavendish Invitational is the largest money bridge tournament in the world. In 2012 it moved from Las Vegas to Monaco and from May to October. From 1975 to 2011, first in New York City and later in Las Vegas, it ran from Friday to Sunday on Mother's Day weekend.

== History and format ==
The Cavendish Invitational Pairs and its companion competitions are named for the Cavendish Club of New York City, which was founded in 1925, months before Harold S. Vanderbilt and others created the scoring system that defined "contract bridge". Some if its members were also among the most famous names in bridge, including Vanderbilt, Ely Culbertson, Charles Goren, Oswald Jacoby, Howard Schenken, Sam Stayman, Zia Mahmood, Bobby Levin and Steve Weinstein. It moved a few times from the Mayfair House to the Ambassador Hotel, thence to the Ritz Tower Hotel and the Carlton House.

The Club initiated its invitational pairs tournament on the second weekend in May 1975 and bridge columnist Alan Truscott called it "the prestigious Cavendish Charity Invitation Pairs" when he covered its conclusion in The New York Times a few days later. Through 1991 the Club hosted the Invitational Pairs annually, alongside a companion invitational tournament for individuals from 1978 to 1981 and one for teams beginning 1983. At midnight on Friday, May 31, 1991, the Cavendish Club went out of business because of increasing rent, decreasing membership, and a lease that may have prohibited a move. (Note: As of October 2014, Björn Fallenius and his wife Kathy operate "The Cavendish Bridge Club" at 177 East 87th Street. Fallenius won the Invitational in 1988, before emigrating from Sweden, and won the Teams in both 2001 and 2005. The new club is not associated with the tournament.) The tournament continued to be held in New York City until 1997 when World Bridge Productions took over the Invitational Pairs tournament and moved operations to Las Vegas, an action which greatly increased the visibility and purse size for the event.

The WBP added an Open Pairs event to broaden the field for more players. The Invitational Pairs is an auctioned event where the top pairs are acquired by the highest bidder at a black tie cocktail party a day before the event starts. The auction pool for the Pairs event has recently been running around a million dollars and has been as high as 1.5 million. Each pair must purchase a minimum 10% share in itself and may exercise its right to own as much as 40% of itself or more if permitted by the winner of the bid. At the conclusion of the tournament 95% of the auction pool is distributed in a scaled payout to the bid winners. Each pair plays three boards against all the other pairs with a time limit of 25 minutes per round. Up to 45 rounds are played to decide the winner.

== Invitational Pairs ==
The Invitational Pairs or "the Cavendish" is the main event of the annual tournament. Steve Weinstein is the winner seven times, Bobby Levin five, Fred Stewart and Kit Woolsey three times each.

At least three women have finished second, Jacqui Mitchell in 1979 and Judi Radin–Kathie Wei in 1981.

Year	Winners	2nd place	3rd place	Source
1975	James Jacoby, Jeff Westheimer	Alberto Calvo, Jeff Hand	Matt Granovetter, Ron Rubin	
1976	Alan Sontag, Peter Weichsel	Jimmy Cayne, Billy Eisenberg	Paul Trent, Sandy Trent	
1977	Alan Sontag, Peter Weichsel	Ronald Blau, Marty Ginsberg	Omar Sharif, Leon Yallouze	
1978	Roy Fox, Paul Swanson	Michael Rosenberg, Barnet Shenkin	Alan Sontag, Peter Weichsel	
1979	Ed Manfield, Kit Woolsey	Jacqui Mitchell, John Roberts	Juan Manuel Nuñez, Jaime Roitman	
1980	Roger Bates, Dan Mordecai	Ed Manfield, Kit Woolsey	Phillip Martin, John Lowenthal	
1981	Lou Bluhm, Tom Sanders	Judi Radin, Kathie Wei	David Berkowitz, Harold Lilie	
1982	Jimmy Cayne, Fred Hamilton	Paul Chemla, Robert Reiplinger	Alan Sontag, Peter Weichsel	
1983	Robert Lipsitz, Neil Silverman	David Berkowitz, Harold Lilie	Billy Eisenberg, Edwin Kantar	
1984	Marty Bergen, Larry N. Cohen	Jeff Meckstroth, Eric Rodwell	David Berkowitz, Harold Lilie	
1985	Irving Litvack, Joey Silver	Billy Cohen, Ron Smith	Bob Blanchard, Drew Casen	
1986	Matt Granovetter, Michael Rosenberg	Fred Stewart, Steve Weinstein	Harold Rockaway, Bobby Wolff	
1987	Drew Casen, Jim Krekorian	Gene Freed, Mike Passell	Marc Jacobus, Paul Lewis	
1988	Björn Fallenius, Magnus Lindkvist	Harold Rockaway, Bobby Wolff	Steve Burgess, Paul Marston	
1989	Marty Bergen, Larry N. Cohen	Ain Otstavel, Hillar Sula	Brian Glubok, Michael Radin	
1990	Piotr Gawryś, Eliakim Shaufel	Jón Baldursson, Aðalsteinn Jörgensen	Ron Andersen, David Berkowitz	
1991	Johan Bennet, Anders Wirgren	Neil Chambers, John Schermer	Russ Ekeblad, Ron Sukoneck	
1992	Amos Kaminski, Sam Lev	Piotr Gawryś, Krzysztof Lasocki	Neil Chambers, John Schermer	
1993	Fred Stewart, Steve Weinstein	Ron Gerard, Mike Kamil	Mike Albert, Paul Soloway	
1994	Neil Silverman, Kit Woolsey	Sam Lev, Bobby Levin	Garey Hayden, Gaylor Kasle	
1995	Paul Soloway, Harry Tudor	Richard Schwartz, Peter Weichsel	Perry Johnson, Jeff Meckstroth	
1996	Fred Stewart, Steve Weinstein	Neil Chambers, John Schermer	Lorenzo Lauria, Alfredo Versace	
1997	Michael Seamon, Harry Tudor	Andrea Buratti, Massimo Lanzarotti	Lorenzo Lauria, Alfredo Versace	
1998	Bob Hamman, Nick Nickell	Zia Mahmood, Steve Weinstein	Fred Gitelman, Brad Moss	
1999	Bobby Levin, Steve Weinstein	Curtis Cheek, Billy Miller	Billy Cohen, Ron Smith	
2000	Martin Fleisher, Eric Rodwell	Steve Garner, Howard Weinstein	David Berkowitz, Larry N. Cohen	
2001	Michał Kwiecień, Jacek Pszczoła	Billy Cohen, Ron Smith	Björn Fallenius, Roy Welland	
2002	Bobby Levin, Steve Weinstein	Walid Elahmady, Tarek Sadek	Eric Greco, Geoff Hampson	
2003	Fred Gitelman, Brad Moss	Walid Elahmady, Tarek Sadek	Ross Grabel, Jon Wittes	
2004	Sam Lev, Jacek Pszczoła	Fulvio Fantoni, Claudio Nunes	Bob Hamman, Zia Mahmood	
2005	Andrea Buratti, Massimo Lanzarotti	Cezary Balicki, Adam Żmudziński	Pablo Lambardi, Juan Carlos Ventin	
2006	Ton Bakkeren, Huub Bertens	Geoff Hampson, Eric Rodwell	Gary Cohler, Howard Weinstein	
2007	Bobby Levin, Steve Weinstein	Drew Casen, Mike Passell	Bruce Rogoff, Louk Verhees	
2008	Geoff Hampson, Eric Rodwell	Gary Cohler, Sam Lev	Bobby Levin, Steve Weinstein	
2009	Bobby Levin, Steve Weinstein	Geoff Hampson, Eric Rodwell	Roy Welland, Chris Willenken	
2010	Bobby Levin, Steve Weinstein	Tor Helness, Geir Helgemo	Josef Piekarek, Alexander Smirnov	
2011	Fred Stewart, Kit Woolsey	Bobby Levin, Steve Weinstein	Billy Cohen, Ron Smith	
2012	Ron Schwartz, Lotan Fisher	Jean Quantin, Philippe Cronier	Zia Mahmood, Agustin Madala	
2013	Ivan Nanev, Rossen Gunev	Krzysztof Martens, Dominic Filipowicz	Geir Helgemo, Tor Helness	
2014	Krzysztof Buras, Gregorz Narkiewicz	Fernando Piedra, Luis Lantaron	Massimiliano Di Franco, Arrigo Franchi	

== Invitational Individual ==
In 1978 the Cavendish Club introduced a two-day singles contest which it called the "world individual championship"(1979). Regular partners Harold Lilie and David Berkowitz finished first and second in 1980(1980) and Berkowitz won the fourth and last rendition next year.

Year	Winner	Runner-up	3rd place	Source
1978	Tom Sanders	B. Jay Becker	Ira Rubin	
1979	Mike Moss	John Solodar	Mark Cohen	
1980	Harold Lilie	David Berkowitz	Gail Moss	
1981	David Berkowitz	Peter Czerniewski	Bobby Levin	

== Invitational Teams ==
The John Roberts Teams is named for World Productions co-founder John Roberts. The field of eight (2011) is filled by invitation only but teams may register to be considered.(2011)

Year	Winner	2nd place	Source
1983	David Berkowitz, Harold Lilie, John Solodar, Bart Bramley, Rich Friesner	Paul Trent, Sandra Trent, Pamela Bridson, Matt Granovetter, Jimmy Rosenbloom, Billy Cohen	
1984	Paul Marston, Steve Burgess, Brian Glubok, Edgar Kaplan, George Berger	?	
1985	Michael Becker, Ron Rubin, Mike Lawrence, Peter Weichsel, David Berkowitz, Harold Lilie	Billy Eisenberg, Kyle Larsen, Ira Rubin, Fred Hamilton	
1986	Matt Granovetter, Michael Rosenberg, Pamela Granovetter, Jimmy Cayne, Zia Mahmood	Eddie Wold, Marty Bergen, Larry N. Cohen and others	
1987	Joel Friedberg, Ethan Stein, Neil Chambers, John Schermer	Björn Fallenius, Magnus Lindkvist, Anders Wirgren, Mats Nilsland	
1988	Cliff Russell, Larry T. Cohen, Dan Rotman, Brian Glubok, Marty Bergen, Larry N. Cohen	Jens Auken, Dennis Koch, Akio Kurokawa, Robert Geller	
1989	Tom Smith, Henry Meyer IV, George Tornay, Saul Bronstein, John Solodar, John Roberts	?	
1990	Paul Marston, Steve Burgess, Kit Woolsey, Ed Manfield	Jill Blanchard (captain) and others	
1991	David Birman and others	?	
1992	Russ Ekeblad, Sheila Ekeblad, Barry Goren, Peter Weichsel	Larry N. Cohen, David Berkowitz, Ron Andersen, Tony Forrester	
1993	Edgar Kaplan, Nick Nickell, Debbie Zuckerberg, Michael Rosenberg, Brian Glubok, Matt Granovetter	?	
1994	Rita Shugart, Bobby Goldman, David Berkowitz, Larry N. Cohen	?	
1995	Sam Lev, Michael Polowan, Piotr Gawryś, Krzysztof Lasocki	Zia Mahmood (captain) and others	
1996	Andrea Buratti, Massimo Lanzarotti, Lorenzo Lauria, Alfredo Versace; Carlo Mosca (npc)	Marcelo Branco, Gabriel Chagas, Eddie Wold, Mark Lair	
1997	Andrea Buratti, Massimo Lanzarotti, Lorenzo Lauria, Alfredo Versace	Bob Hamman, Barry Goren, Jeff Meckstroth, Perry Johnson	
1998	Jan van Cleeff, Jan Jansma, Bauke Muller, Wubbo de Boer	Jim Mahaffey, Paul Soloway, Gene Freed, Mike Passell, Harry Tudor, Michael Seamon	
1999	Steve Weinstein, Bobby Levin, Chip Martel, Lew Stansby	Peter Boyd, Steve Robinson, Kit Woolsey, Fred Stewart	
2000	Perry Johnson, Jeff Meckstroth, Eric Rodwell, Geoff Hampson, Eric Greco	Bobby Levin, Steve Weinstein, David Berkowitz, Larry N. Cohen	
2001	Roy Welland, Björn Fallenius, Brad Moss, Fred Gitelman, Howard Weinstein, Steve Garner	John Onstott, Chris Compton, Jim Robison, Roger Bates, Jon Wittes, Ross Grabel	
2002	Bob Blanchard, Sam Lev, Piotr Gawryś, Krzysztof Jassem	Alain Lévy, Hervé Mouiel, Pierre Saporta, Pierre Zimmermann	
2003	Perry Johnson, Jeff Meckstroth, Eric Rodwell, Geoff Hampson, Eric Greco	Malcolm Brachman, Mike Passell, Eddie Wold, Fulvio Fantoni, Claudio Nunes	
2004	Charles Wigoder, Gunnar Hallberg, Michael Cornell, Ryszard Jedrychowski	Seymon Deutsch, Paul Soloway, Billy Cohen, Ron Smith, Cezary Balicki, Adam Żmudziński	
2005	Roy Welland, Björn Fallenius, Bobby Levin, Steve Weinstein	two teams	
2006	Wafik Abdou, Connie Goldberg, Steve Landen, Pratap Rajadhyaksha	two teams	
2007	Gaylor Kasle, John Diamond, Drew Casen, Jim Krekorian, John Schermer, Neil Chambers	Seymon Deutsch, Paul Soloway, Billy Cohen, Ron Smith, Valerio Giubilo, Alfredo Versace	
2008	Lou Ann O'Rourke, Marc Jacobus, Geoff Hampson, Eric Rodwell, Bobby Levin, Steve Weinstein	Cornell Teodorescu, Ionut Coldea, Paul Chemla, Michel Lebel	
2009	Jim Mahaffey, Mike Passell, Sam Lev, Jacek Pszczoła, Jack Zhao, Zhong Fu	Marc Jacobus, Geoff Hampson, Eric Rodwell, Bobby Levin, Steve Weinstein; Lou Ann O'Rourke (npc)	
2010	Pierre Zimmermann, Franck Multon, Michel Bessis, Thomas Bessis, Geir Helgemo, Tor Helness	Kevin Bathurst, Daniel Zagorin, Bart Bramley, Nicolay Demirev	
2011	Lou Ann O'Rourke, Marc Jacobus, Geoff Hampson, Eric Greco, Bobby Levin, Steve Weinstein	Roy Welland, Bart Bramley, Josef Piekarek, Alex Smirnov, Zia Mahmood	
2012	Pierre Zimmermann, Fulvio Fantoni, Claudio Nunes, Geir Helgemo, Tor Helness, Franck Multon		
2013	Marion Michelsen, Johann Upmark, Frederik Nystrom, Jan Kamras and Frederic Wrang		
2014	Michel Eidi, Michel Bessis, Thomas Bessis, Vassili Vroustis		
2015	Agnes Snellers, Joris van Lankveld, Berend van den Bos, Wubbo de Boer		

== World Bridge Productions Open Pairs ==
First prize in the open pairs includes free entry to the next Invitational Pairs with options regarding the auction. There is an auction for the WBP pairs, minimum bid $1000.(2011)

Year	Winners	2nd place	3rd place	Source
1998	Joe Jabon, Billy Miller	Nell Cahn, Petra Hamman	Lea Dupont, Benito Garozzo	
1999	Rob Crawford, Dan Jacob	Dennis Clerkin, Brenda Jacobus	Leonard Ernst, Richard Halperin	
2000	Larry T. Cohen, Jill Levin	Benito Garozzo, Richard Reisig	Petra Hamman, Nancy Passell	
2001	Barry Schaffer, Colby Vernay	Ken Kranyak, Keith Wolff	Richard Coren, Fred Hamilton	
2002	Barry Schaffer, Colby Vernay	Rob Crawford, Dan Jacob	George Mittelman, Peter Nagy	
2003	Russell Samuel, Shawn Samuel	Leslie Amoils, Darren Wolpert	Lynn Baker, Debbie Rosenberg	
2004	Ishmael Del'Monte, David Stern	Allan Cokin, Harold Lilie	Sheila Ekeblad, Michael Seamon	
2005	Blair Seidler, Kevin Wilson	Wafik Abdou, Connie Goldberg	Mike Cappelletti Jr., Doug Levene	
2006	Wafik Abdou, Connie Goldberg	Fred Hamilton, John Jeffrey	Mike Cappelletti Jr., John Morris	
2007	Ira Chorush, Hemant Lall	Tom Carmichael, Joel Wooldridge	Fred Hamilton, John Jeffrey	
2008	Tom Carmichael, Joel Wooldridge	Wojciech Kurkowski, Roger Lord	Billy Eisenberg, Connie Goldberg	
2009	Leo Bell, John Jones	Wafik Abdou, Gaylor Kasle	Leonard Ernst, Fred Hamilton	
2010	Magy Mohan, Miriam Rosenberg	Howard Parker, David Siebert	Fred Hamilton, John Jeffrey	
2011	Barry Schaffer, Colby Vernay	Reese Milner, Matt Granovetter	Laurie Kranyak, Frank Treiber	
