= Zia Mahmood =

Pakistani-American bridge player

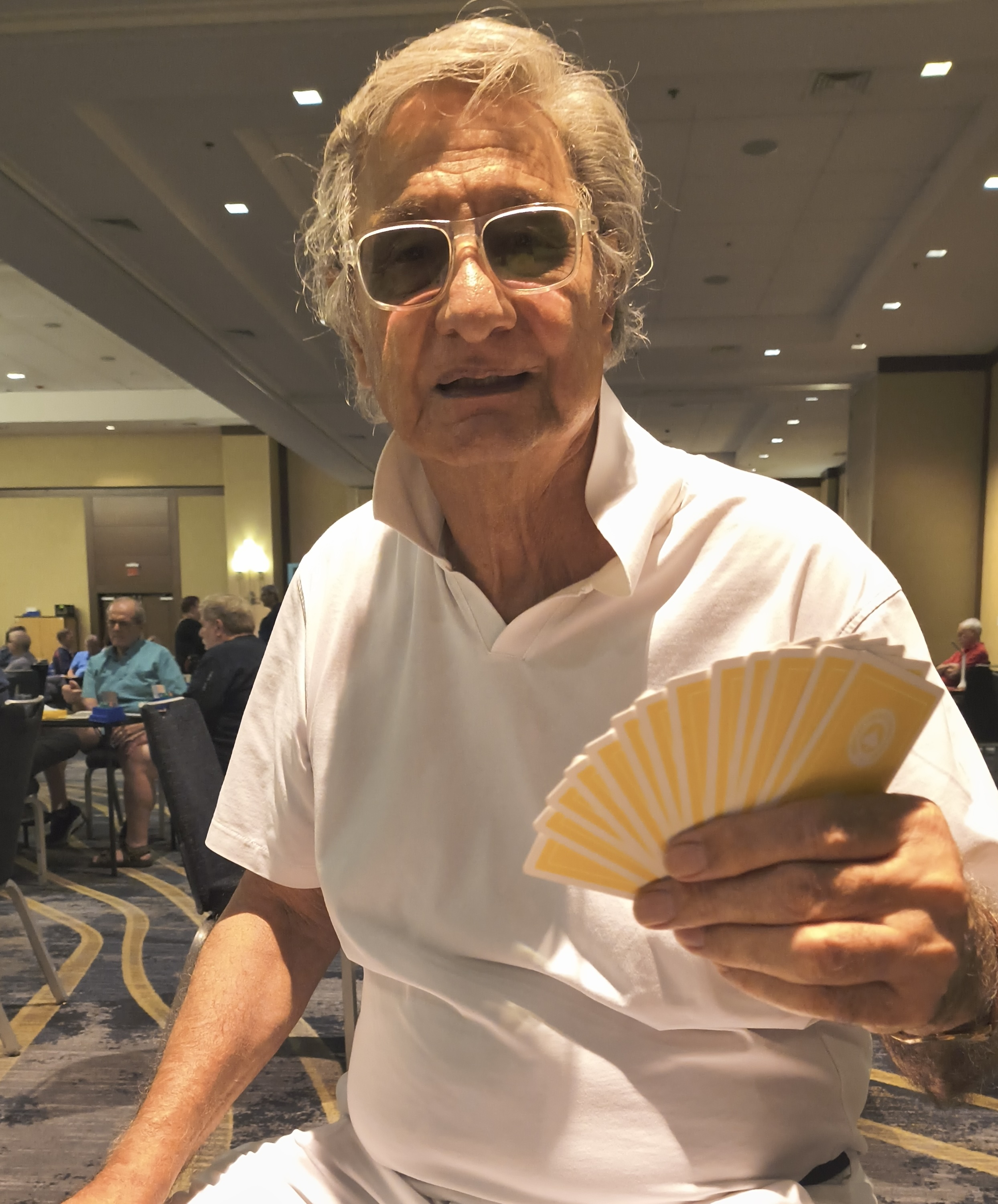
- Zia Mahmood, Philadelphia 2025

Mir Zia Mahmood (born 7 January 1946) is a Pakistani-American professional bridge player. He is a World Bridge Federation and American Contract Bridge League Grand Life Master. As of April 2011 he was the 10th-ranked World Grand Master.

== Biography ==
Zia was born in Karachi, British India, now Pakistan. Zia was educated in England from the age of six to twenty-one. He qualified as a Chartered Accountant of the Institute of England and Wales and spent three years running a family business in Pakistan. He also spent eighteen months in Abu Dhabi developing business interests.

Mahmood is married to Lady Emma. They have two sons: Zain and Rafi. Zain is also a bridge player

== Bridge ==
Mahmood achieved international bridge fame, almost overnight, during one fortnight in 1981 when he led Pakistan to a second-place finish in the Bermuda Bowl tournament. The Bermuda Bowl is the most important open world championship, and that was the first participation by anyone from the World Bridge Federation geographic zone "Asia and the Middle East". It also tied Taiwan for the best finish by anyone from outside Europe and the United States. It is now the second best finish from outside Europe and the United States, after Brazil won the tournament in 1989.

Five years later, Zia led a short-handed team from Pakistan to second place in the 1986 Rosenblum Cup tournament, which is the open world championship in even-number non-Olympic years. That remains tied for best finish by anyone from outside Europe and the United States. The event is transnational, but none of the nine winning teams has included a single player from outside Europe and the United States.

Zia Mahmood is the author of Bridge My Way, an autobiography, and has hosted many TV shows. For many years his regular partner was Masood Salim (deceased), followed by Michael Rosenberg, and now Bob Hamman—as members of Nick Nickell's professional team through spring 2012.

Beginning 2012/2013, (Note: The current cycle for major professional teams in the United States covers 2011 and 2012 world championships, which are contested in the second half of the calendar year. New commitments begin in July but do not interfere with the world stage of the previous cycle. "Rosenberg-Willenken Joining Fleisher in 2012" by Martin Fleisher (13 July 2011). Bridge Winners. Retrieved 15 July 2011. See the clarification by Fleisher in the comments.) Nickell has replaced Hamman and Zia with Bobby Levin–Steve Weinstein.

Zia has represented the United States in world competition, and thus he won his first major world championship, the 2009 Bermuda Bowl. Although he won the quadrennial Mixed Teams in 2004 with Sabine Auken and a French pair. He still considers himself Pakistani, however: "I am proud and happy to be representing America, but my Pakistani identity is in no way submerged. I feel like a Pakistani who is living in America and playing for America." To prove his point, Zia and his American teammates once played their opening match in Pakistani dress.

Mahmood spends much of his time in Great Britain and the United States and is very much part of the London bridge scene. He wrote a weekly column for The Guardian newspaper until January 2012, when the paper stopped covering bridge.

The ACBL Hall of Fame inducted Zia in 2007. According to the citation sometime that year, he was a London resident.

Zia won the ACBL's 3-day Life Master Pairs championship in 2000, 2004, 2007 and 2023 with four different partners. He has also been a 6-time runner-up.

Mariusz Puczyński is a Polish bridge player whose greatest achievement has been to win the Bronze Medal in the 2004 European Bridge Championship. His teammates on that occasion included Cezary Balicki and Adam Żmudziński, for many years known as Poland's strongest pair and as one of the strongest pairs in the world. During the 2015 bridge cheating scandals, Puczyński satisfied himself that his former teammates had not been playing honestly, and returned his medal to the European Bridge League because he no longer wanted it. In early 2019, Puczyński had by chance the opportunity to partner Zia in a tournament in Poland. Someone told Zia about Puczyński's gesture, and he warmly complimented him for it. On 15 May 2019, Puczyński received a package through the post as a present. It contained the Gold Medal which Zia had won at the 2009 Bermuda Bowl.

== Honors ==
- ACBL Hall of Fame, 2007
- ACBL Honorary Member of the Year 2006

== Awards ==
- ACBL Player of the Year 1991, 1996, 2000, 2005, 2012
- Mott-Smith Trophy 1991, 1996
- Herman Trophy 2005, 2012
- IBPA Award (Personality of the Year) 2007
- Le Bridgeur Award (Best Played Hand of the Year) 1984
- Romex Award (Best Bid Hand of the Year) 1983, 1987
- Precision Award (Best Defended Hand of the Year) 1995

== Wins ==
- Bermuda Bowl (1) 2009
- World Transnational Mixed Teams (1) 2004
- Gold Cup (1) 2010
- North American Bridge Championships (26)
  - von Zedtwitz Life Master Pairs (3) 2000, 2004, 2007, 2023
  - Blue Ribbon Pairs (1) 1998
  - Nail Life Master Open Pairs (5) 1990, 1991, 2005, 2007, 2012
  - Jacoby Open Swiss Teams (1) 2009
  - Vanderbilt (4) 1994, 1996, 2015, 2023
  - Mitchell Board-a-Match Teams (4) 1991, 1996, 2006, 2008
  - Chicago Mixed Board-a-Match (1) 1999
  - Reisinger (5) 1987, 1989, 1996, 2008, 2009
  - Spingold (2) 1991, 2003
- United States Bridge Championships (3)
  - Open Team Trials (3) 1997, 1999, 2006
- Asia & the Middle East Championships (5)
  - Open Teams (5) 1981, 1983, 1985, 1987, 1991
- Other notable wins:
  - Buffett Cup (1) 2006
  - Richard Lederer Memorial Trophy (7) 1978, 1990, 1998, 1999, 2000, 2002, 2006
  - Cavendish Invitational Teams (1) 1986
  - Staten Bank World Top Invitational Pairs (1) 1988
  - Cap Gemini Pandata World Top Invitational Pairs (1) 1992
  - Cap Volmac World Top Invitational Pairs (1) 1995
  - Cap Gemini World Top Invitational Pairs (2) 1998, 2000
  - Cap Gemini Ernst & Young World Top Invitational Pairs (1) 2001
  - Politiken World Pairs (1) 1995
  - Omar Sharif Individual (1) 1990
  - Portland Club Individual (1) 1990

== Runners-up ==
- Bermuda Bowl (2) 1981, 2007
- Rosenblum Cup (2) 1986, 2010
- World Open Pairs Championship (1) 2002
- Buffett Cup (1) 2008
- Cavendish Invitational Pairs (1) 1998
- Gold Cup (1) 1982
- North American Bridge Championships (27)
  - Jacoby Open Swiss Teams (3) 1992, 2010, 2014
  - Mitchell Board-a-Match Teams (1) 2004
  - Nail Life Master Open Pairs (2) 2000, 2001
  - Reisinger (3) 2002, 2003, 2005
  - Roth Open Swiss Teams (1) 2013
  - Silodor Open Pairs (4) 1991, 1994, 2006, 2007
  - Spingold (3) 1993, 1995, 2011
  - Vanderbilt (4) 1988, 1990, 1991, 2000
  - Wernher Open Pairs (1) 1987
  - von Zedtwitz Life Master Pairs (5) 1992, 2005, 2011, 2012, 2014
- United States Bridge Championships (5)
  - Open Team Trials (5) 1996, 2000, 2002, 2004, 2005
- Other notable 2nd places:
  - Forbo-Krommenie International Teams (1) 1997
  - Cavendish Invitational Teams (2) 1995, 2006

== See also ==
- "Your Deal, Mr. Bond", a published James Bond short story in which the secret agent impersonates Mahmood
