= Roy Welland =

American bridge player and wine connoisseur

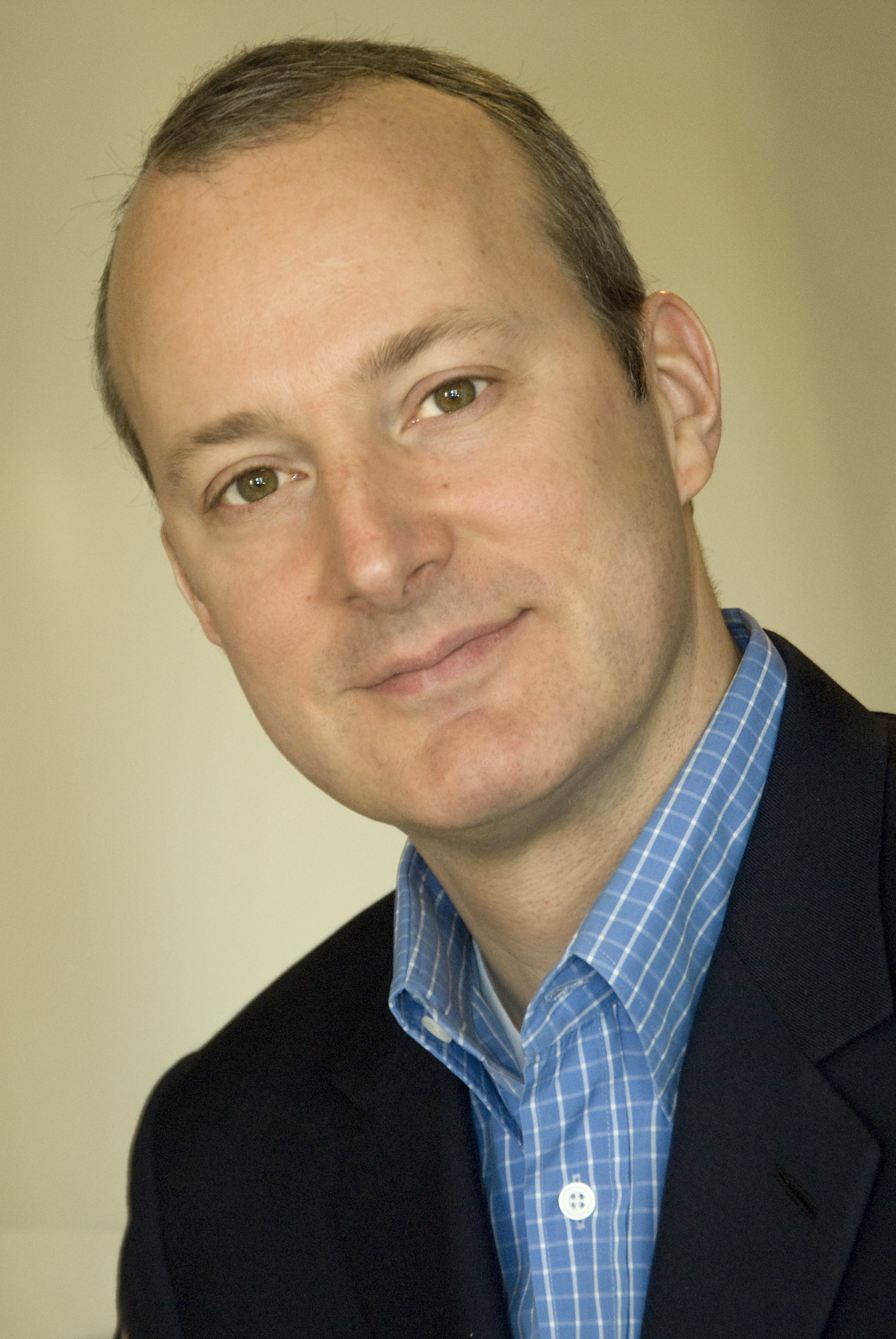
- Country (sports): United States
- Residence: Copenhagen, Denmark
- Born: October 2, 1962 (age 64) Madison, Wisconsin, U.S.
- Last updated on: December 5, 2010.

Roy Welland (born October 2, 1962) is a wine connoisseur and world class bridge player. He plays for Germany and currently lives in Copenhagen, Denmark.

== Biography ==
=== Early life ===
Welland was born in Madison, Wisconsin and raised in Evanston, Illinois. His father taught mathematics at Northwestern University. In 1980, he moved to New York to pursue a career on Wall Street and became an options trader. Over time, he became a wine enthusiast and amassed a significant wine collection.

=== Bridge career ===
Roy Welland began playing bridge in 1986 when he won the American Contract Bridge League's (ACBL's) Rookie of the Year Award; he went on to win numerous national championships. In 2004, he was on the team chosen by the United States Bridge Federation to represent the country in the World Team Olympiad in Istanbul, Turkey. In March 2007, he won the Mott-Smith Trophy. Later that year, he won the Player of the Year Award for best performance in the 2007 national events.

== Bridge accomplishments ==
=== Awards (3) ===
Year	Award	Event Type	Level
1986	Rookie of the Year Award	Masterpoint Race	National (Rookies)
2007	Mott-Smith Trophy	Masterpoint Race	National
2007	Player of the Year Award	Masterpoint Race	National
2008	ACBL Sportsman of the Year 2008		National

=== Wins (10) ===
Year	Tournament	On Team/Played With	Event Type	Level
2001	Cavendish Invitational Teams	Welland	Teams	N/A
2001	Reisinger Trophy	Welland	Teams	National
2003	European Open Bridge Championships	Welland	Mixed Teams	World
2003	Spingold	Welland	Teams	National
2005	Cavendish Invitational Teams	Welland	Teams	N/A
2005	Victor Mitchell Open Board-a-Match Teams	Björn Fallenius (partner), Chip Martel, Lew Stansby, Cezary Balicki, Adam Żmudziński	Teams	National
2006	Open Swiss Teams	Henner-Welland	Teams	National
2006	Warren Buffett Cup	United States	Point-a-Board Teams/Pairs/Ind.	U.S. & Europe
2007	Vanderbilt National Knockout Teams	Henner-Welland	Teams	National
2007	Silodor Open Pairs	Giorgio DuBoin (Italy)	Pairs	National
2013	Vanderbilt National Knockout Teams	Auken	Teams	National
2013	European Open Pairs Championships	Sabine Auken	Pairs	World
2014	World Open Mixed Team Championships 2014	Salvo	Teams	World
2016	World Bridge Games Open Pairs 2016	Sabine Auken	Pairs	World
2016	Spingold	Fleisher	Teams	National
2017	German Team Championship	Auken	Teams	National
2018	German Bundesliga Pair Championships	Sabine Auken	Pairs	National

=== Runners-up (6) ===
Year	Tournament	On Team/Played With	Opponent in Final/Winner	Event Type	Level
2000	Spingold	Welland	Meltzer	Teams	National
2005	USBC	Welland	Ekeblad	Teams	National
2005	World Transnational Open Teams Championship	Spector	Schneider (Poland) (United States)	Teams	World
2006	Cavendish Invitational Teams (Tied for 2-3)	Welland	Abdou	Teams	National
2007	Grand National Teams	District 24	District 9	Teams	National
2008	Spingold	Welland	Gromov (Russia) (Poland)	Teams	National
2008	Warren Buffett Cup	United States	Europe	Point-a-Board; Teams/Pairs/Ind.	USA & Europe
2010	Reisinger Trophy	Smirnov	N/A	Board-a-Match	National
2012	Reisinger Trophy	Auken	N/A	Board-a-Match	National
