= Fallenius =

Fallenius is a surname. Notable people with the surname include:

- Björn Fallenius (1957–2023), Swedish bridge player
- Oskar Fallenius (born 2001), Swedish footballer
