= World Open Pairs Championship =

Bridge (cards) competition

The World Open Pairs Championship is a contract bridge competition initiated in 1962 and held as part of the World Bridge Series Championships every four years. Open to all pairs without any quota restrictions on nationality, the championship is widely regarded as the most prestigious pairs competition in contract bridge. In its present form, the competition lasts eight days.

== Results ==
World meets commonly run for 15 days on a schedule whose details vary.

In 2006 the Open Pairs played Saturday to Saturday, the 8th to 15th days of the meet, with five qualifying, five semifinal, and five final sessions. At the start of qualifying, 32 teams remained in the knockout stage of the marquee teams competition for the Rosenblum Cup. During qualifying sessions for the pairs, the Rosenblum teams were reduced from 32 to 8. There were some provisions for late entry to the pairs by players knocked out of the teams at a late stage. There were 392 pairs in the qualifier, 193 in the semifinal, and 72 in the final.

United States pairs have won four of 14 tournaments through 2014, Brazil two, Poland two, and six other nations one each. (The tournament is "open" in several respects including the registered nationalities of partners but no transnational pair has won any of the 42 medals.) Marcelo Branco of Brazil is the only two-time champion.

Year, Site	Entries		Medalists	
1962 Cannes, France		1.	(France) Pierre Jaïs	(France) Roger Trézel
1962 Cannes, France		2.	(United Kingdom) Terence Reese	(United Kingdom) Boris Schapiro
1962 Cannes, France	(Note: The WBF currently lists only the winners and runners up, neither third place nor the size of the field.)	3.	(France) René Bacherich	(France) Pierre Ghestem
1966 Amsterdam, Netherlands		1.	(Netherlands) Hans Kreijns	(Netherlands) Bob Slavenburg
1966 Amsterdam, Netherlands		2.	(United States) John Fisher	(United States) Jim Jacoby
1966 Amsterdam, Netherlands		3.	(United States) B. Jay Becker	(United States) Dorothy Hayden
1970 Stockholm, Sweden		1.	(Austria) Fritz Babsch	(Austria) Peter Manhardt
1970 Stockholm, Sweden		2.	(Italy) Benito Garozzo	(Italy) Federico Mayer
1970 Stockholm, Sweden		3.	(Italy) William Saulino	(Italy) Italo Zanasi
1974 Las Palmas, Spain	(Note: For 1974 to 1998 the WBF currently lists at least three leaders (3 in 1974; 72 in 1998) without the size of the field. Some of those listings may enumerate the finalists.)	1.	(United States) Bob Hamman	(United States) Bobby Wolff
1974 Las Palmas, Spain		2.	(Italy) Adriano Abate	(Italy) Leandro Burgay
1974 Las Palmas, Spain		3.	(Italy) Federico De Paula	(Italy) Italo Zanasi
1978 New Orleans, USA		1.	(Brazil) Marcelo Branco	(Brazil) Gabino Cintra
1978 New Orleans, USA		2.	(Canada) Eric Kokish	(Canada) Peter Nagy
1978 New Orleans, USA		3.	(United States) Roger Bates	(United States) John Mohan
1982 Biarritz, France		1.	(United States) Chip Martel	(United States) Lew Stansby
1982 Biarritz, France		2.	(Netherlands) Anton Maas	(Netherlands) Max Rebattu
1982 Biarritz, France		3.	(Brazil) Gabriel Chagas	(Brazil) Roberto Mello
1986 Miami Beach, USA		1.	(United States) Jeff Meckstroth	(United States) Eric Rodwell
1986 Miami Beach, USA		2.	(Austria) Heinrich Berger	(Austria) Wolfgang Meinl
1986 Miami Beach, USA		3.	(Australia) Steve Burgess	(Australia) Paul Marston
1990 Geneva, Switzerland		1.	(Brazil) Marcelo Branco	(Brazil) Gabriel Chagas
1990 Geneva, Switzerland		2.	(United States) Ralph Katz	(United States) Peter Nagy
1990 Geneva, Switzerland		3.	(Poland) Cezary Balicki	(Poland) Adam Żmudziński
1994 Albuquerque, USA		1.	(Poland) Marcin Leśniewski	(Poland) Marek Szymanowski
1994 Albuquerque, USA		2.	(United States) Bob Hamman	(United States) Michael Rosenberg
1994 Albuquerque, USA		3.	(Netherlands) Eric Kirchhoff	(Netherlands) Anton Maas
1998 Lille, France		1.	(Poland) Michał Kwiecień	(Poland) Jacek Pszczoła
1998 Lille, France		2.	(United States) David Berkowitz	(United States) Larry N. Cohen
1998 Lille, France		3.	(Sweden) Peter Fredin	(Sweden) Magnus Lindkvist
2002 Montreal, Canada	327	1.	(Italy) Fulvio Fantoni	(Italy) Claudio Nunes
2002 Montreal, Canada		2.	(United States) Zia Mahmood	(United States) Michael Rosenberg
2002 Montreal, Canada		3.	(Brazil) Diego Brenner	(Brazil) Gabriel Chagas
2006 Verona, Italy	392	1.	(China) FU Zhong	(China) ZHAO Jie (Jack Zhao)
2006 Verona, Italy		2.	(United States) Bobby Levin	(United States) Steve Weinstein
2006 Verona, Italy		3.	(Italy) Fulvio Fantoni	(Italy) Claudio Nunes
2010 Philadelphia, USA	313	1.	(United States) Bobby Levin	(United States) Steve Weinstein
2010 Philadelphia, USA		2.	(Sweden) Björn Fallenius	(Sweden) Peter Fredin
2010 Philadelphia, USA		3.	(Germany) Josef Piekarek	(Germany) Alexander Smirnov
2014 Sanya, China	200 (Note: There were 200 initial entries in 2014, excluding drop-ins from the teams.)	1.	(Israel) Ehud Friedlander	(Israel) Inon Liran
2014 Sanya, China		2.	(Poland) Jacek Kalita	(Poland) Michał Nowosadzki
2014 Sanya, China		3.	(France) Thomas Bessis	(France) Cédric Lorenzini

== See also ==
- World Mixed Pairs Championship
- World Women Pairs Championship
