= Adam Grossack =

American bridge player

- Born: Adam Grossack; Boston, MA

Adam Grossack is an American bridge player from Boston. Adam has won five North American Bridge Championship and a World Junior Individual championship. Adam was awarded the ACBL King of Bridge title in 2010.

== Bridge accomplishments ==
=== Wins ===
- World Bridge Championships (2)
  - World Junior Individual Champion (1) 2010
  - World Youth Open Bridge Championships Swiss Teams (1) 2013
  - Bermuda Bowl 2025
- North American Bridge Championships (5)
  - Fast Open Pairs (1) 2014
  - Grand National Teams (1) 2016
  - North American Pairs (1) 2018
  - Roth Open Swiss Teams (1) 2022
  - Jacoby Open Swiss Teams (1) 2022
- Awards
  - ACBL King or Queen of Bridge, 2010

=== Runners-up ===
- North American Bridge Championships (1)
  - Silodor Open Pairs (1) 2019
  - Grand National Teams (1) 2024
  - Jacoby Open Swiss Teams (1) 2025

== Personal life ==
Adam is the son of Richard and Jori. He has two brothers, Zachary (Zach), who is also a Bridge player, and Sam.

Adam also plays poker recreationally, with over 2,000 dollars in live tournament earnings. He has played in the WSOP Main Event 4 times; surviving to day 3 in three of them.

Adam, along with his brother Zach, were both featured in the bridge documentary "Double Dummy" and had a cameo appearance in the poker documentary "Matusow".
