= Justin Lall =

American bridge player (1986–2020)

Justin Lall (September 27, 1986 – August 19, 2020) was an American bridge player. He won his first masterpoints in 1997, and became a Life Master in 1999. In 2012, Lall became the youngest Grand Life Master at the age of 25, a record that has since been surpassed by Zachary Grossack. In 2024, Lall was inducted into the ACBL Hall of Fame.

== Bridge accomplishments ==
=== Wins ===
- World Junior Teams Championship (2) 2005, 2006
- Buffett Cup (1) 2012
- North American Bridge Championships (5)
  - Grand National Teams (1) 2006
  - Nail Life Master Open Pairs (1) 2011
  - Norman Kay Platinum Pairs (2) 2012, 2017
  - Roth Open Swiss Teams (1) 2015

=== Runners-up ===
- Bermuda Bowl (1) 2011
- North American Bridge Championships (2)
  - Keohane North American Swiss Teams (1) 2009
  - Nail Life Master Open Pairs (1) 2009

== Personal life ==
Lall was born to Hemant (also a bridge player) and Jan, along with his sister Jessica.

On February 17, 2009, Lall jumped off the Brooklyn Bridge in a suicide attempt but survived; Lall stated that he was bipolar and off his medicine. He died from liver disease and is survived by his longtime girlfriend Stefanie and her son Aiden.
