= Carl Hudecek =

Carl J. Hudecek (born December 3, 1934) is an American, internationally known expert on sealing glasses, metal expansion and contraction, and metal oxidation processes for glass sealing. Hudecek holds or co-holds many U.S. and international patents in sealing glasses, television picture tube materials and processing, and sealing alloys.

Hudecek was born in Toledo, Ohio. He is from Perrysburg, Ohio and graduated from the University of Toledo.

Most of his working career was spent at Owens-Illinois Glass Company in Toledo, where he was chief physicist and laboratory manager. Hudecek was one of the U.S. pioneers in designing and installing turnkey manufacturing operations for sealing glasses in Russia and Germany. Through his consulting company, Perrysburg, Ohio-based Bridgecon Services, Hudecek consults in the area of sealing glasses. He has also taught courses on sealing and joining at Rutgers University and Missouri School of Mines.

In addition, Hudecek is an expert at the game of contract bridge. He won the national American Contract Bridge League Life Master Open Pairs championship in 1966, partnered by Ray Zoller. Hudecek has been a long-term member of the panel of experts for The Bridge World magazine and has written many bridge articles and commentaries.. He holds the title of Sapphire Life Master with the American Contract Bridge League (ACBL).

== Bridge accomplishments ==
=== Wins ===
- North American Bridge Championships (1)
  - Nail Life Master Open Pairs (1) 1966
- More than 50 ACBL regional events
