= Geir Helgemo =

Norwegian bridge player

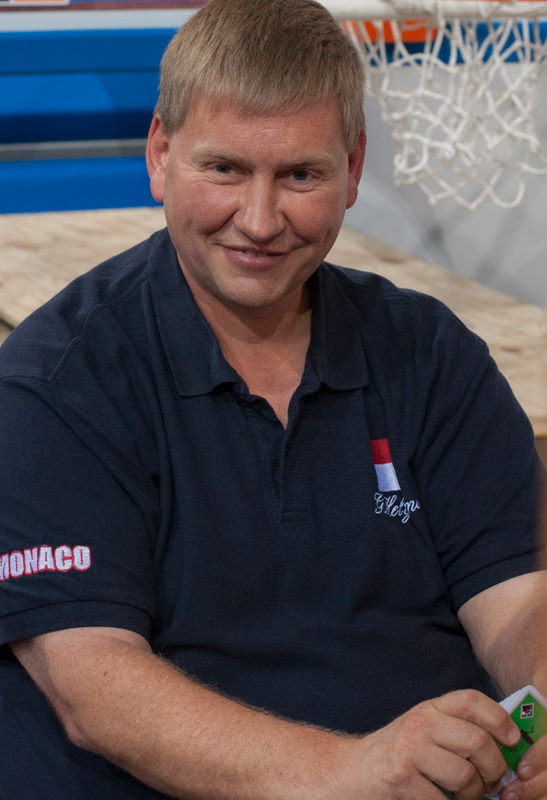
Geir Helgemo

Geir Helgemo (born 14 February 1970) is a professional bridge player who was born in Norway but is now a citizen of Monaco. Through 2012 he had won three world championships in teams-of-four competition. As of August 2018 he ranked first among Open World Grand Masters and his regular partner Tor Helness ranked second.

Helgemo was born in Vinstra, Norway. For several years through 1994 he represented Norway on both its junior and open teams. The juniors won the 1990 European Championship and both teams finished second in the 1993 World Championships. From that time Helgemo played with Tor Helness on the open team, which was always strong and won another world silver medal in 2001. Norway finally won the world team championship in 2007, the biennial Bermuda Bowl, with a team of six including Helness–Helgemo as anchor pair.

At the inaugural 2008 World Mind Sports Games in Beijing, Tor Helness won the Open Individual gold medal and Geir Helgemo won the silver. Norway's open team won the bronze.

== Emigration to Monaco ==
From 2011 Helgemo and Helness were full-time members of a team led and funded by the Swiss real estate tycoon Pierre Zimmermann, under a contract expiring in 2016. The team, not yet playing full-time, finished third in the 2010 World Championship and subsequently competed in the European Bridge League open championship. In 2012, all six members of the team became citizens of Monaco. In 2017 Helgemo and Helness were both convicted of tax evasion."

== Reporting False Scores - Suspension ==
Helgemo's team reported a false score (claiming a match was played when it was not to the benefit of both teams) in a match in Norway. All players involved were suspended by the Norwegian Bridge Federation. Three of the players involved, Terje Aa (ACBL # 9027661), Geir Helgemo (ACBL # 4036808) and Jørgen Molberg (ACBL # 8896631) were members of the American Contract Bridge League (ACBL) and were suspended by the ACBL.

== Use of prohibited drugs ==
On 1 March 2019, at which time Helgemo was the world's highest-ranked player, the World Bridge Federation (WBF) announced that he had been suspended for a year after testing positive for two banned substances in a sample he had provided at the World Bridge Series in Orlando in September 2018: clomifene and synthetic testosterone. The drugs were said to be "not performance enhancing" by Kari-Anne Opsal, the president of the Norwegian Bridge Federation. The WBF is recognised by the International Olympic Committee and therefore follows the World Anti-Doping Agency's rules on which drugs are permissible. The ban, backdated to begin when he accepted a provisional suspension, expired on 20 November 2019. A spokesperson for the Monaco Bridge Federation said: "We regret that a talent such as Geir Helgemo is sanctioned under an anti-doping regulation that is certainly adapted to physical sport but totally unsuitable for brain sport."

== Books ==
- Helgemo's World of Bridge: the maestro reveals his secrets, Geo Tislevoll and Helgemo (High Wycombe: Five Aces, 2000), 102 pp. – biography; translated from Norwegian, OCLC 44934034
- Bridge with Imagination, David Bird and Helgemo (London: Finesse Bridge, 2000), 160 pp., OCLC 50842581

== Bridge accomplishments ==
=== Awards ===
- Herman Trophy 1999
- IBPA Award (Personality of the Year) 1996
- Le Bridgeur Award (Best Played Hand of the Year) 1997
- Digital Fountain Award (Best Played Hand of the Year) 2003
- Romex Award (Best Bid Hand of the Year) 1999
- Precision Award (Best Defended Hand of the Year) 1991
- Sender Award (Best Defended Hand of the Year) 1998

=== Major wins ===
- Bermuda Bowl (1) 2007
- Rosenblum Cup (1) 2006
- World Junior Pairs (1) 1995
- World Transnational Open Teams Championship (1) 2009, 2015
- North American Bridge Championships (12)
  - Reisinger (4) 1998, 1999, 2012, 2013
  - Vanderbilt (1) 2010
  - Spingold (2) 2011, 2012
  - Open Board-a-Match Teams (1) 1999
  - Jacoby Open Swiss Teams (2) 1997, 2005
  - Blue Ribbon Pairs (1) 2003
  - Open Pairs I (1) 1998
- European Championships (4)
  - Open Teams (2) 2008, 2012, 2024
  - Junior Teams (1) 1990
- Nordic Championships (3)
  - Open Teams (1) 2003
  - Junior Teams (1) 1989
  - School Teams (1) 1987
- Norwegian Championships (34)
  - Open Pairs (7) 1993, 1995, 1996, 1999, 2000, 2006, 2007
  - Club Teams (8) 1997, 2000, 2002, 2004, 2006, 2008, 2014, 2022
  - Premier League (12) 1990, 1991, 1992, 1998, 2000, 2002, 2003, 2004, 2005, 2014, 2015, 2022
  - Swiss Pairs (1) 2022
  - Mixed Pairs (3) 1995, 2001, 2014
  - Mixed Teams (1) 2006
  - Junior Pairs (1) 1993

=== Other notable wins ===
- Cap Volmac World Top Invitational Pairs (2) 1994, 1996
- Cap Gemini Ernst & Young World Top Invitational Pairs (1) 2002
- Macallan Invitational Pairs (2) 1998, 1999
- Politiken World Pairs (1) 1997
- Hecht Cup (1) 2006
- Generali World Masters Individual (1) 1996
- Cavendish Invitational Teams (1) 2010

=== Major runners-up ===
- Bermuda Bowl (4) 1993, 2001, 2013, 2023
- Rosenblum Cup (1) 2014
- The Vanderbilt Trophy (1) 2016
- World Mixed Teams (1) 2022
- World Junior Teams (1) 1993
- North American Bridge Championships (5)
  - Master Mixed Teams (1) 1998
  - Blue Ribbon Pairs (1) 1997
  - Life Master Pairs (2) 1996, 1997
  - Open Pairs I (1) 1997
- European Championships (2)
  - Open Teams (2) 2001, 2014

=== Other notable 2nd places ===
- Buffett Cup (1) 2006
- World Mind Sports Games Individual (1) 2008
- Cavendish Invitational Pairs (1) 2010
