= Larry Cohen (bridge) =

American bridge player, writer, and teacher

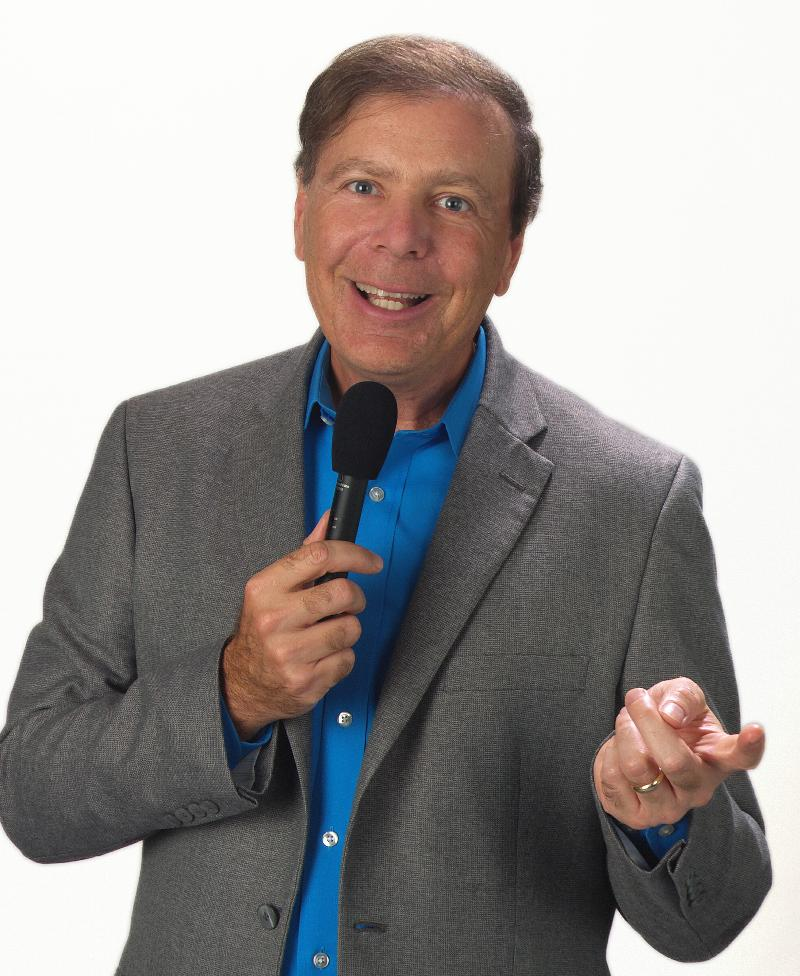
Larry Cohen Teaching Bridge

Larry Neil Cohen (born April 14, 1959) is an American bridge player, writer and teacher. He is best known as an advocate for the "Law of Total Tricks" as a guide in the bidding. He has won a World Bridge Championship, 25 North American Bridge Championships (NABC) events including the Vanderbilt, two Spingolds, two Reisingers, three Life Master Pairs, and four Blue Ribbon Pairs, and he is a two-time winner of the Cavendish Invitational Pairs cash prize tournament.

Cohen's most important work on "the Law" was To Bid or Not to Bid: The LAW of Total Tricks, published in 1992. It was the best-selling bridge book of the 1990s with more than 90,000 copies sold in six different languages and its sequel Following the Law was another bridge best seller. He is known for long-term expert partnerships with Marty Bergen, Ron Gerard, and David Berkowitz, but announced his retirement from high-level competition in 2009 to devote more time to writing and teaching the game. However, he has, on occasion, played in high-level competition thereafter.

Cohen was born in New York City. He learned to play bridge at age six with his grandparents and brother Paul Cohen, started playing duplicate at age 14, and began playing in tournaments at age 15. He became an American Contract Bridge League (ACBL) Life Master at age 17.

He now makes a living as a bridge teacher, often on cruise ships and as a guest speaker/teacher at country clubs and bridge clubs across the United States and around the world. In March 2020 he and his team successfully transitioned into live webinars. He writes monthly columns titled The Real Deal and Bidding Basics, in the ACBL Bridge Bulletin. An extensive list of bridge articles and information can be found on his website and in his regular newsletters. He currently resides with his wife, Maria Eugenia, in Delray Beach, Florida.

== Bridge accomplishments ==
=== Honors ===
- ACBL Hall of Fame, 2020
- Sidney H. Lazard Jr. Sportsmanship Award 2003

=== Awards ===
- ACBL Named in Top 52 Most Influential People of Bridge 2013
- ACBL Honorary Member of the Year 2011
- ACBL Sportsman of the Year 2003
- ITES Award (Best Defended Hand of the Year) 2003 (Winning Journalist)
- ACBL Player of the Year 2002
- Romex Award (Best Bid Hand of the Year) 1995, 2000
- Precision Award (Best Defended Hand of the Year) 1996
- ABTA Winner of seven+ Book/Software of the Year Awards

=== Wins ===
- World Bridge Championship (1)
  - d'Orsi Trophy - World Senior Team Championship 2025
- North American Bridge Championships (25)
  - Grand National Teams (3) 1994, 2007, 2008
  - Blue Ribbon Pairs (4) 1981, 1983, 1988, 1995
  - Keohane North American Swiss Teams (1) 1999
  - Mitchell Board-a-Match Teams (3) 1984, 1991, 2007
  - Chicago Mixed Board-a-Match (1) 2002
  - Nail Life Master Open Pairs (1) 1983
  - Reisinger (2) 1985, 1991
  - Silodor Open Pairs (3) 2004, 2006, 2009
  - Spingold (2) 1981, 1984
  - Vanderbilt (1) 2005
  - Wernher Open Pairs (1) 1996
  - von Zedtwitz Life Master Pairs (3) 1987, 1988, 1996
- United States Bridge Championships (2)
  - Open Team Trials (1) 2000
  - Senior Team Trials (1) 2025
- Other notable wins:
  - Buffett Cup (1) 2006
  - Cavendish Invitational Teams (2) 1988, 1994
  - Pan American Open Teams (1) 1992
  - Cap Gemini World Top Invitational Pairs (1) 1999
  - Cavendish Invitational Pairs (2) 1984, 1989
  - Goldman Pairs (1) 1983

=== Runners-up ===
- World Open Pairs (1) 1998
- North American Bridge Championships (22)
  - North American Pairs (2) 1980, 1984
  - Grand National Teams (1) 1991
  - Blue Ribbon Pairs (1) 1996
  - Keohane North American Swiss Teams (1) 2006
  - Mitchell Board-a-Match Teams (2) 1990, 2008
  - Chicago Mixed Board-a-Match (1) 1994
  - Nail Life Master Open Pairs (3) 1986, 1991, 2002
  - Reisinger (3) 2002, 2004, 2007
  - Silodor Open Pairs (2) 1979, 2002
  - Spingold (2) 1983, 2009
  - Vanderbilt (4) 1990, 1993, 1998, 2004
- United States Bridge Championships (4)
  - Open Team Trials (4) 1985, 1998, 2002, 2008
- Other notable 2nd places:
  - Cavendish Invitational Teams (2) 1986, 2000
  - Goldman Pairs (1) 1991

== Selected works ==
Books

- Larry Teaches Modern Bidding Vol. I, II, and III (Self-Published 2020) ABTA Award Winner
- On The Other Hand Co-written with David Bird (2019) ABTA Award Winner
- On The Other Hand - Defense Co-written with David Bird (2020) ABTA Award Winner
- Tricks of the Trade (2018) ABTA Award Winner
- Larry Teaches Declarer Play at Suit Contracts (Self-Published March 2017)
- Larry Teaches Declarer Play at Notrump (Self-Published April 2016)
- Larry Teaches Defense (Self-Published March 2015)
- Larry Teaches Opening Leads (Self-Published October 2014) ABTA Award Winner
- Larry Teaches Doubles and Redoubles (Self-Published October 2013)
- Larry Teaches 2/1 Game Force (Self-Published April 2012)
- My Favorite 52 (Toronto: Master Point Press, 2009)
- Larry Cohen's Bidding Challenge (Toronto: Master Point Press, 2002) OCLC 48533856
- Introduction to the Law (Devyn Press, 1997)
- Bridge Below the Belt, Cohen and Liz Davis (Boca Raton, FL: Natco, 1997) OCLC 37682710
- Following the LAW: The Total Tricks Sequel (Little Falls, NJ: Natco Press, 1995; (c) 1994) OCLC 34135078
- To Bid or Not to Bid: The LAW of Total Tricks (Stamford, CT: Platinum Press, 1992) OCLC 28013533 ABTA Award Winner

Interactive CD ROMs

- The Real Deal Advanced (2010) ABTA Award Winner
- The Real Deal Intermediate (2010) ABTA Award Winner
- Play Bridge with Larry Cohen (1999 Life Master Pairs) Day 1, Day 2, and Day 3 ABTA Award Winner
- My Favorite 52 (2005) ABTA Award Winner

CDs

- Talking Bridge (2012) ABTA Award Winner

DVDs

- Including: Larry Teaches Third-Hand Play, Second-Hand Play, Signals, Opening Leads, Defensive Planning, Declarer Play at Notrump, Declarer Play at Suit Contracts Draw or Not Draw Trump, 2/1 Game Force, Takeout Doubles, and Slam Bidding. (2019) ABTA Award Winner -Technology of the Year
