= Christian Jolly =

American bridge player

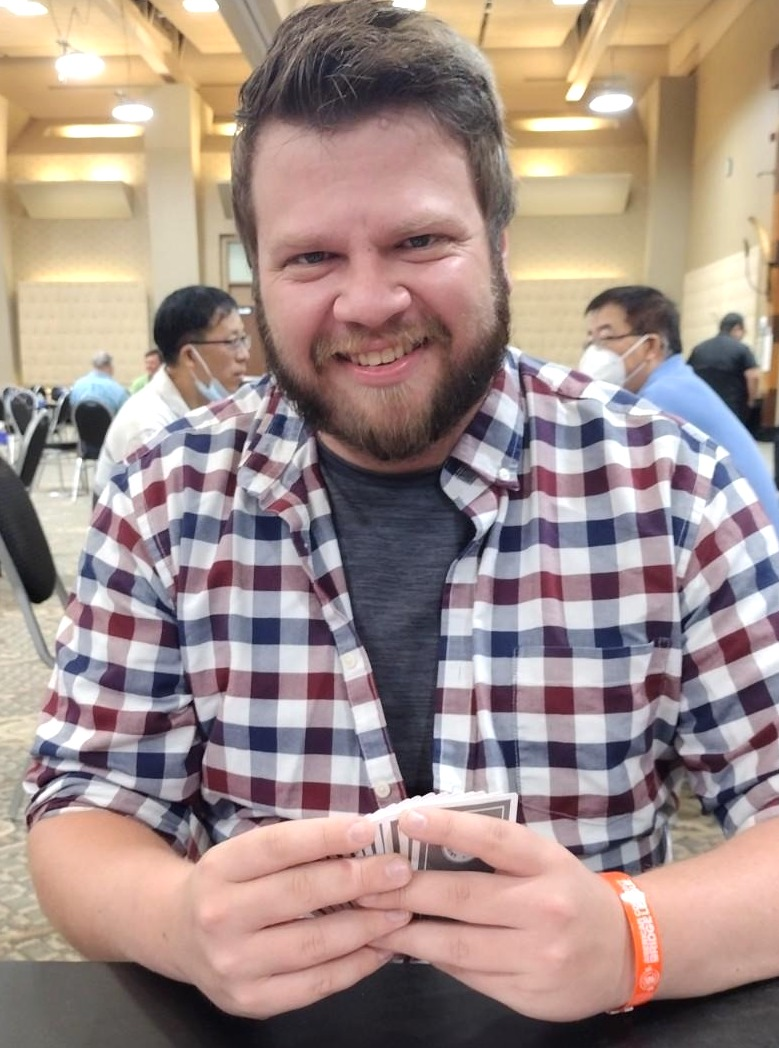

Christian Jolly is an American North American champion bridge player.

== Bridge accomplishments ==
=== Wins ===
- North American Bridge Championships (1)
  - Wernher Open Pairs (1) 2022

== Personal life ==
Christian lives in Detroit.
