= Wernher Open Pairs =

American bridge event

The Wernher Open Pairs national bridge championship is held at the summer American Contract Bridge League (ACBL) North American Bridge Championship (NABC).

Typically starting on the Tuesday of the NABC, the Wernher Open Pairs is a four session matchpoint pairs event, with two qualifying sessions and two final sessions. The event is open to any player, but due to its current conflicting schedule with the more prestigious Spingold Knockout Teams, it is generally considered to be the weakest open national event on the calendar.

== History ==
The Wernher Open pairs is a four-session event with two qualifying sessions and two final sessions. It was contested at the Summer NABC until 1962. It moved to the Spring NABC in 1963 where it remained for 40 years.

In 2004, it returned to the Summer NABC lineup. From 1969 through 1971, it was contested as a three-session championship. In 1992 the event became Open Pairs II.

The winners have their names inscribed on the Wernher trophy, named after Sir Derrick J. Wernher, a leading personality in American bridge in the Thirties. Wernher -- a resident of both London and Deal NJ -- was president of the American Bridge League in 1933, chairman of its Master Plan committee and a member of the board of directors of the American Whist League.

== Winners ==
During 56 years as the national or North American championship Men's Pairs, two champions successfully defended the title playing together: Doug Drury–Eric Murray in 1955, Phil Feldesman–Ira Rubin in 1962. Indeed, they were the only pairs to win the event twice.

Winners of Men's Pairs (1934–1989)
Year	Winners	Runners-up
1934	David Burnstine, Oswald Jacoby	Morrie Elis, George Kennedy
1935	Edward Cook, Fred French	Charles Goren, Louis H. Watson
1936	Richard Ecker, Fred Kaplan	Bertram Lebhar Jr., Samuel Katz
1937	Edward Cook, John Kunkle	Philip Abramsohn, Morrie Elis
1938	B. Jay Becker, Charles Goren	Morrie Elis, Waldemar von Zedtwitz
1939	John R. Crawford, Oswald Jacoby	Henry Chanin, Morrie Elis
1940	Merwyn Maier, Robert McPherran	Morrie Elis, Harry Fishbein
1941	Joseph Low, Simon Rossant	Joseph Davis, Sidney Silodor
1942	Robert von Engel, Aaron Goodman	Murray Gross, William Lipton
1943	Charles Goren, Charles Solomon	Richard Ecker, Fred Kaplan
1944	Sigmund Dornbusch, Herman Goldberg	Ambrose Casner, Ralph Hirschberg
1945	Sylvester Gintell, Lee Hazen	George Rapée, Sam Stayman
1946	Mitchell Barnes, Waldemar von Zedtwitz	Lewis Bernard, Frank Weisbach
1947	Sol Mogal, Tobias Stone	Morrie Elis, Morris Portugal
1948	Fred Hirsch, Samuel Katz	Lewis Bernard, Harold Feldstein
1949	Charles Goren, Oswald Jacoby	Bobby Nail, J. G. Ripstra
1950	Phillip Briggs, Richard Revell	George Rapée, Sidney Silodor
1951	Milton Ellenby, Emmanuel Hochfeld	Clifford Bishop, Alexander Nusinoff
1952	Arthur Grau, William Rosen	Harold Harkavy, Tobias Stone
1953	Harold Harkavy, Bill Root	John R. Crawford, Waldemar von Zedtwitz
1954	Doug Drury, Eric Murray	Milton Ellenby, Douglas Steen
1955	Doug Drury, Eric Murray	Ira Rubin, Victor Mitchell
1956	Paul Allinger, Jim Jacoby	Robert Jordan, Robert Sitnek
1957	David Carter, John Hubbell	John Gerber, Paul Hodge
1958	William Grieve, Ira Rubin	Norman Kay, Sidney Silodor
1959	Harry Fishbein, John Gerber	Erik Paulsen, Mike Shuman
1960	Jack Blair, William Christian	David Carter, Paul Hodge
1961	Phil Feldesman, Ira Rubin	Paul Allinger, Lew Mathe
1962	Phil Feldesman, Ira Rubin	Eddie Kantar, Marshall Miles
1963	Sami Kehela, Wolf Lebovic	Sonny Moyse, Tommy Sanders
1964	Ed Weiner, G. Gard Hays	Darryl Pedersen, Don Nemiro
1965	Lawrence Rosler, Jeff Rubens	Norman Kay, Eric Murray
1966	Barry Crane, Peter Rank	Mark Blumenthal, Mike Moss
1967	Richard Lawrence, Art Price	Eddie Kantar, Sidney Lazard
1968	Kyle Larsen, Edmond Lazarus	Bill Passell, David Strasberg
1969	Michael Martino, Frank Vine	Gerald Hallee, Paul Soloway
1970	Richard Kaye, Richard Walsh	Edgar Kaplan, Norman Kay
1971	Giorgio Belladonna, Benito Garozzo	Robert Kerr, Jay McKee
1972	Steve Robinson, Kit Woolsey	Paul Heitner, Marshall Miles
1973	Jack Kennedy, David Hadden	Steve Robinson, Kit Woolsey
1974	George Slemmons, George Steiner	Steve Robinson, Kit Woolsey
1975	Harlow Lewis, Art Waldemann	Larry Kozlove, John Sheridan
1976	Gerald Caravelli, Larry T. Cohen	Jack Kennedy, Bobby Wolff
1977	Joseph Fox, Garey Hayden	David Lehman, Dick Melson
1978	Larry Kozlove, John Sheridan	Roy Fox, Paul Swanson
1979	Roy Fox, Paul Swanson	Perry Johnson, Michael Zerbini
1980	Neil Silverman, Peter Weichsel	Warren Rosner, Stephen Sanborn
1981	Warren Rosner, Allan Stauber	Billy Eisenberg, Neil Silverman
1982	David Berkowitz, Harold Lilie	James Barlow, Chuck Carroll
1983	Marty Bergen, Allan Stauber	Mike Passell, Ron Andersen
1984	Mike Lawrence, Peter Weichsel	Joel Friedberg, Ethan Stein
1985	Ed Manfield, Kit Woolsey	Bob Hamman, George Mittelman
1986	Bob Hamman, Paul Swanson	Bobby Levin, Fred Hamilton
1987	Darryl Pedersen, George Steiner	Zia Mahmood, Chris Compton
1988	Arthur Hoffman, Stephen Shane	Ken Kranyak, Harry Stratton
1989	Mike Moss, Charles Coon	Robert Beiles, Sidney Lorvan

Winners of Open Pairs (1990–)
Year	Winners	Runners-up
1990	Steve Sion, Steve Landen	Neil Silverman, Mike Smolen
1991	Ken Cohen, Bob Thomas	JoAnna Stansby, Lew Stansby
1992	Jeff Meckstroth, Perry Johnson	Tony Glynne, James Elliott
1993	Gaylor Kasle, Bobby Levin	Eddie Wold, Dennis Sorensen
1994	Thomas Peters, John Zilic	Steve Beatty, Curtis Cheek
1995	Fred Stewart, Steve Weinstein	Martin Caley, Peter Schwartz
1996	David Berkowitz, Larry N. Cohen	Jackie Buroker, Dick Yarington
1997	Lloyd Arvedon, Allan Falk	Bart Bramley, Sidney Lazard
1998	Björn Fallenius, Mike Moss	Evan Bailey, Joseph Kivel
1999	Jeff Meckstroth, Eric Rodwell	Bobby Levin, Steve Weinstein
2000	Stephen Landen, Pratap Rajadhyaksha	Kenneth Kranyak, Harry Stratton
2001	Chris Willenken, Ron Smith	Joseph Kivel, Chris Larsen
2002	Curtis Cheek, Eric Greco	Geoff Hampson, Renee Mancuso
2003	Geoff Hampson, Eric Greco	Ken Cohen, Dan Gerstman
2004	Fulvio Fantoni, Claudio Nunes	Kit Woolsey, Fred Stewart
2005	Nagy Kamel, Nader Hanna	Samuel Marks, Emory Whitaker
2006	Jianrong Lin, Julie Zhu	Cameron Doner, Bob Etter
2007	Joan Jackson, Petra Hamman	Daniel Korbel, Jonathan Steinberg
2008	K. R. Venkataraman, Sunit Chokshi	Don Piafsky, Barry Piafsky
2009	Nikolay Demirev, Nicolas L'Ecuyer	Alan Kleist, Tim Crank
2010	Richard Burton, Beatrice Kemp	Tom Carmichael, Jeff Roman
2011	Meyer Kotkin, Howard Cohen	Robb Gordon, Richard Margolis
2012	Robert Lebi, David Lindop	Pamela Miller, James Rasmussen
2013	Valentin Kovachev, Lynne Rosenbaum	Larry Sealy, Jim Foster
2014	Marc Nathan, Jose Robles	Giuseppe Failla, Dario Attanasio
2015	Ai-Tai Lo, William Pettis	Mark Itabashi, Peter Gelfand
2016	Federic Pollack, Kamel Fergani	Brian Glubok, David Treitel
2017	Joel Wooldridge, John Hurd	Piotr Nawrocki, Piotr Wiankowski
2018	Juan Carlos Ventin, Joaquin Pacareu	Rick Binder, Alan Watson
2019	Mark Bendure, Robert Bitterman	Kamel Fergani, Frederic Pollack
2020	Cancelled (Covid)	
2021	Cancelled (Covid)	
2022	Andrew Cavalier, Christian Jolly	Jian Wang, Jian-Ping Chen

Winners of Men's Pairs, Spring NABCs, 1958–1962
Year	Winners	Runners-up
1958	Norman Kay, Sidney Silodor	Jack Denny, Richard Harrison
1959	James Pestaner, John Swanson	Don Oakie, Meyer Schleifer
1960	Frank Hoadley, Julius Rosenblum	Harold Creed, Samuel Gould
1961	Morton Rubinow, Tobias Stone	Erik Paulsen, Alex Tschekaloff
1962	Ivan Erdos, Phil Feldesman	Norman Kay, Sidney Silodor

== Sources ==
- List of previous winners, Page 16.Daily Bulletin (PDF), vol. 81–5, July 28, 2009
- 2009 winners, Page 1. Daily Bulletin (PDF), vol. 81–7, July 30, 2009
- "Search Results". ACBL. Visit "NABC Winners"; select a Spring NABC. Retrieved 2014-06.
- "Search Results - Updated 2018" Visit
