= David Berkowitz (contract bridge) =

American bridge player

- Born: David L. Berkowitz; November 23, 1949 (age 76); Old Tappan, New Jersey, U.S.
- Occupation: Contract bridge player

David L. Berkowitz (born November 23, 1949) is an American professional contract bridge player. He is from Old Tappan, New Jersey.

In 1998, he came as close as it is possible to come to a world championship without winning it. In the World Open Pairs, he and Larry Cohen led throughout the five-session final, only to be overtaken on the last two boards. He also earned a bronze medal at the 2000 World Team Olympiad in Maastricht, Netherlands. He was inducted into the ACBL Hall of Fame in 2010.

Berkowitz, whose wife Lisa is a former women's world champion, often comments, "I am not even the best player in my own house." They reside in Boca Raton, Florida. Their daughter Dana and son Michael play bridge as well.

== Bridge accomplishments ==
=== Honors ===
- ACBL Hall of Fame, 2010

=== Awards ===
- Mott-Smith Trophy (Spring NABC) 1982
- Fishbein Trophy (Summer NABC) 2011, 2018
- Herman Trophy (Fall NABC) 1991
- Digital Fountain Award (Best Played Hand of the Year) 2001
- Romex Award (Best Bid Hand of the Year) 1995, 2000
- Precision Award (Best Defended Hand of the Year) 1996

=== Wins ===
- North American Bridge Championships (33)
  - von Zedtwitz Life Master Pairs (2) 1987, 1996
  - Rockwell Mixed Pairs (2) 1986, 1987
  - Silodor Open Pairs (3) 2004, 2006, 2009
  - Wernher Open Pairs (2) 1982, 1996
  - Blue Ribbon Pairs (2) 1978, 1995
  - North American Pairs (1) 1995
  - Grand National Teams (9) 1994, 2007, 2008, 2011, 2012, 2013, 2015, 2018, 2023
  - Roth Open Swiss Teams (1) 2011
  - Vanderbilt (1) 2005
  - Keohane North American Swiss Teams (1) 1999
  - Mitchell Board-a-Match Teams (3) 1982, 1991, 2007
  - Chicago Mixed Board-a-Match (4) 1986, 1993, 1995, 1998
  - Reisinger (1) 1991
  - Nail Life Master Open Pairs (1) 2024
- United States Bridge Championships (1)
  - Open Team Trials (1) 2000
- Other notable wins:
  - Buffett Cup (1) 2006
  - Cavendish Invitational Teams (3) 1983, 1985, 1994
  - Pan American Open Teams (1) 1992
  - Reisinger Knockout Teams (2) 1990, 2001
  - Cap Gemini World Top Invitational Pairs (1) 1999
  - Cavendish Invitational Individual (1) 1981

=== Runners-up ===
- World Open Pairs (1) 1998
- North American Bridge Championships (27)
  - Vanderbilt (8) 1979, 1984, 1988, 1990, 1993, 1998, 2004, 2025
  - Spingold (4) 1976, 2009, 2010, 2018
  - Reisinger (4) 1987, 2002, 2004, 2007
  - Open Board-a-Match Teams (1) 2008
  - Men's Board-a-Match Teams (1) 1989
  - North American Swiss Teams (2) 2006, 2022
  - Mixed Board-a-Match Teams (1) 2011
  - Blue Ribbon Pairs (2) 1976, 1996
  - Life Master Open Pairs (1) 1991
  - Open Pairs (2) 1983, 1985
  - Open Pairs I (1) 2002
- United States Bridge Championships (5)
  - Open Team Trials (5) 1987, 1989, 1998, 2002, 2008
- Other notable 2nd places:
  - Buffett Cup (1) 2008
  - Cavendish Invitational Teams (1) 2000
  - Reisinger Knockout Teams (2) 1973, 1981
  - Cavendish Invitational Pairs (1) 1983
  - Cavendish Invitational Individual (1) 1980
