= Ivar Stakgold =

Norwegian American mathematician

Ivar Stakgold (December 13, 1925 – May 29, 2018) was a Norwegian-born American academic mathematician and bridge player from Newark, Delaware. As the sole author of two books he specialized in boundary value problems (LCSH).

== Life ==
Stakgold was born in Oslo, Norway to parents with Russian-Jewish heritage. He studied applied mathematics at Harvard University and earned the Ph.D. in 1949 with a dissertation, The Cauchy Relations In A Molecular Theory of Elasticity, under Léon Nicolas Brillouin. He was professor emeritus of mathematical sciences at the University of Delaware and a researcher at the University of California, San Diego. He was a former president of the Society for Industrial and Applied Mathematics (SIAM).

== Books ==
=== By Stakgold ===
- Boundary Value Problems of Mathematical Physics, 2 vols. (Macmillan, 1967), Macmillan series in advanced mathematics and theoretical physics, LCCN 67-10304; reprint 2000, SIAM Classics in applied mathematics, no. 29
- Nonlinear Problems in the Physical Sciences and Biology: proceedings of a Battelle Summer Institute, Seattle, July 3–28, 1972, eds. Stakgold and others (Springer-Verlag, 1973), LCCN 73-78428
- Green's Functions and Boundary Value Problems (Wiley, 1979); 2nd ed. 1998; 3rd ed. 2011, Stakgold and Michael J. Holst
- Analytical and Computational Methods in Scattering and Applied Mathematics, eds. Fadil Santosa and Stakgold (Chapman & Hall/CRC, 2000) – "A volume to the memory of Ralph Ellis Kleinman", LCCN 99-87683

=== Other ===
- Nonlinear Problems in Applied Mathematics: in honor of Ivar Stakgold on his 70th birthday, eds. T.S. Angell and others (Philadelphia:SIAM, 1996), LCCN 96-112982

== Bridge accomplishments ==
=== Awards ===
- Mott-Smith Trophy (1) 1958

=== Wins ===
- North American Bridge Championships (5)
  - Silodor Open Pairs (1) 1958
  - Vanderbilt (1) 1958
  - Chicago Mixed Board-a-Match (1) 1969
  - Reisinger (1) 1958
  - Spingold (1) 1962

=== Runners-up ===
- Bermuda Bowl (1) 1959
- North American Bridge Championships
  - Silodor Open Pairs (1) 1963
  - Mitchell Board-a-Match Teams (1) 1957
  - Spingold (1) 1958
