= Allan Stauber =

American bridge player

Allan G. Stauber (born February 7, 1944) is an American bridge player, ACBL Grand Life Master. Raised in Plainview, New York, he was valedictorian of his high school class. He received a Bachelor's Degree and a Master's Degree from Rensselaer Polytechnic Institute in Troy, New York, with a major in Math and a minor in Physics. He then worked as a programmer for IBM, later becoming a dealer in coins, stamps, and baseball cards, and then a stock trader.

== Bridge accomplishments ==
=== Awards ===
- Mott-Smith Trophy (1) 1981

=== Wins ===
- North American Bridge Championships (7)
  - Wernher Open Pairs (2) 1981, 1983
  - Blue Ribbon Pairs (1) 1980
  - Jacoby Open Swiss Teams (1) 1982
  - Mitchell Board-a-Match Teams (1) 1981
  - Reisinger (1) 1984
  - Spingold (1) 1981

=== Runners-up ===
- North American Bridge Championships
  - Fast Open Pairs (1) 2010
  - Grand National Teams (1) 1979
