= Paul Swanson =

American bridge player (1932–2024)

Paul Swanson (June 21, 1932 – September 23, 2024) was an American bridge player from Morgantown, West Virginia. He was also the founder of Swanson Industries. Swanson died on September 23, 2024, at the age of 92.

== Bridge accomplishments ==
=== Awards ===
- Mott-Smith Trophy (1) 1972

=== Wins ===
- North American Bridge Championships (5)
  - von Zedtwitz Life Master Pairs (1) 1973
  - Wernher Open Pairs (2) 1979, 1986
  - Mitchell Board-a-Match Teams (1) 1972
  - Chicago Mixed Board-a-Match (1) 1976

=== Runners-up ===
- North American Bridge Championships
  - Wernher Open Pairs (1) 1978
  - Nail Life Master Open Pairs (1) 1980
  - Reisinger (3) 1963, 1973, 1980
