= Jacek Pszczoła =

Polish-American bridge player

Jacek Pszczoła (born January 10, 1967, died April 25, 2026) was an American professional bridge player of Polish origin. Representing Poland, Pszczoła won the 1998 World Open Pairs Championship with Michał Kwiecień. American bridge players often refer to him by the nickname "Pepsi". He was Player of the Year of the ACBL in 2019.

== Bridge accomplishments ==
=== Wins ===
- World Open Pairs (1) 1998
- Bermuda Bowl (1) 2017
- North American Bridge Championships (5)
  - Life Master Open Pairs (1) 2001
  - Jacoby Open Swiss Teams (1) 2004
  - Vanderbilt Knockout Teams (1) 2001
  - Spingold Knockout Teams (1) 2019
  - Reisinger Board-a-Match Teams (1) 2006
  - Rockwell Trophy Rockwell_Mixed_Pairs (with May Sakr) 2022
- Other notable wins:
  - Buffett Cup (1) 2008
  - Cavendish Invitational Teams (1) 2009
  - Cavendish Invitational Pairs (2) 2001, 2004
  - NEC Cup Bridge Festival (1) 2001

=== Runners-up ===
- World Open Team Olympiad (1) 2000
- North American Bridge Championships (5)
  - Open Board-a-Match Teams (3) 2000, 2003, 2005
  - Reisinger Board-a-Match Teams (1) 2019
  - Vanderbilt Knockout Teams (1) 2002
- European Championships (1)
  - Open Teams (1) 1997
- Other notable 2nd places:
  - IOC Grand Prix (1) 2002
