= Petra Hamman =

American bridge player

Petra Hamman (born 1946) is an American bridge player. She was born in Germany but is now from Dallas, Texas.

== Bridge accomplishments ==
=== Awards ===
- Mott-Smith Trophy (1) 1999

=== Wins ===
- North American Bridge Championships (10)
  - Wernher Open Pairs (1) 2007
  - Freeman Mixed Board-a-Match (2) 2011, 2013
  - Grand National Teams (1) 2006
  - Machlin Women's Swiss Teams (1) 1999
  - Sternberg Women's Board-a-Match Teams (3) 1989, 1998, 2000
  - Chicago Mixed Board-a-Match (2) 2003, 2005

=== Runners-up ===
- North American Bridge Championships (3)
  - Silodor Open Pairs (1) 1999
  - Machlin Women's Swiss Teams (1) 1992
  - Wagar Women's Knockout Teams (1) 2000
