= Valentin Kovachev =

Bulgarian professional bridge player (born 1964)

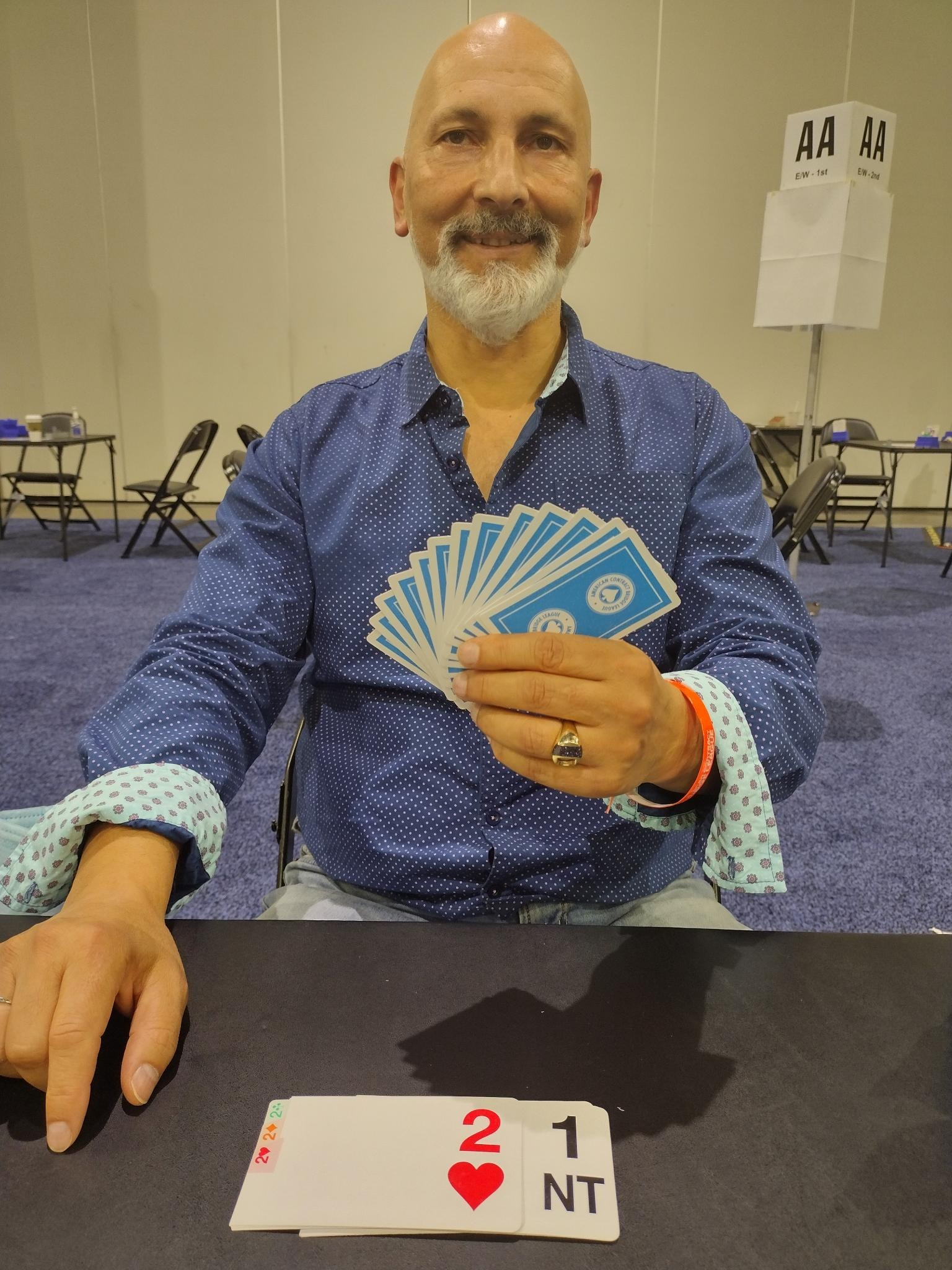
- Valentin Kovachev
- Born: May 6, 1964 (age 61); Sofia, Bulgaria

Valentin (Val/Valio) Kovachev (Bulgarian: Валентин Ковачев) (born May 6, 1964 in Sofia, Bulgaria) is a Bulgarian professional bridge player who lives in Las Vegas.

== Career ==
Kovachev has been playing professional bridge since 2003. Kovachev has won all the major Bulgarian bridge championships. Additionally, he has won the Schapiro Cup in England, and placed second on two other occasions. Valentin Kovachev has three top 3 finishes in the NEC Cup in 2010, 2011, and 2012.

== Bridge accomplishments ==
=== Wins ===
- North American Bridge Championships (2)
  - Wernher Open Pairs (1) 2013
  - NABC+ Mixed Swiss Teams (1) 2017

=== Runners-up ===
- NEC Japan
