= ACBL King or Queen of Bridge =

High school card game award

The ACBL King or Queen of Bridge is a graduating high school senior annually designated by the American Contract Bridge League. Currently a $2000 scholarship accompanies the title.

The King or Queen is the high school senior in North America (US, Canada, Mexico, and Bermuda) with the "best record in bridge". Students now formally enter the annual contest and identify their qualifications. Beside outstanding performance in bridge tournaments, the winner is commonly cited for sportsmanship and for "bridge activities such as teaching, directing, and unit/district participation".

The King of Bridge was established in 1973 by Homer Shoop of Indiana as a prize for the high school senior with the greatest number of ACBL master points. The second and third winners, Jeff Meckstroth and Bobby Levin in 1974 and 1975, won the 1981 Bermuda Bowl as United States teammates; Levin was the youngest person to be a world champion at bridge. Several other Kings and Queens have become leading expert players.

== Winners ==
- 1973, J Merril
- 1974, Jeff Meckstroth
- 1975, Bobby Levin
- 1976, Warren Spector
- 1977, Marc Franklin
- 1978, Matthew K. Franklin
- 1979, Regina Barnes
- 1980, Tony Marks
- 1981, Doug Levene, Steve Cochran
- 1982, Steve Weinstein
- 1983, Billy Hsieh
- 1984, James Munday
- 1985, Adair Gellman
- 1986, Martha Benson ‡
- 1987, Richard Pavlicek, Jr.
- 1988, Holly Zullo
- 1989, Brad Moss
- 1990, Eric Sutherland
- 1991, Andrew Moss
- 1992, Frederic Pollack
- 1993, Eric Greco
- 1994, Sam Hirschman
- 1995, Tony Melucci
- 1996, Kent Mignocchi
- 1997, Joel Wooldridge
- 1998, Josh Heller
- 1999, Ari Greenberg
- 2000, Gavin Wolpert
- 2001, Erin Anderson
- 2002, John Kranyak †
- 2003, Scottie Waldron Jr.
- 2004, Rob Glickman
- 2005, David Banh
- 2006, Sam Katz ‡
- 2007, Andrew Dubay
- 2008, Jeremy Koegel
- 2009, Nick Flores
- 2010, Tom Walsh, Adam Grossack
- 2011, Blake Sanders
- 2012, Murphy Green
- 2013, John Altman
- 2014, Adam Kaplan, Allison Hunt †
- 2015, Amber Lin
- 2016, Burke Snowden
- 2017, Richard Jeng
- 2018, Reese Koppel
- 2019, Louis Beauchet
- 2020, Bo Han Zhu
- 2021, Tammy Leon Molina
- 2022, Arthur Zhou
- 2023, Olivia Schireson
- 2024, Darwin Li
- 2025, Nathan Gong

‡ 2006 King of Bridge Sam Katz is the son of 1986 Queen of Bridge Martha Benson. They are the only recipients related as child and parent.
† 2002 King of Bridge John Kranyak married 2014 Queen of Bridge Allison Hunt on June 16, 2018
