= Curtis Cheek =

American bridge player (1958–2024)

Curtis Scott Cheek (February 15, 1958 – December 24, 2024) was an American bridge player. Cheek was from Huntsville, Alabama, and was an aerospace engineer.

Cheek and the Dutch star Huub Bertens, who at the time resided in Oregon, established a partnership that represented the United States in the SportAccord World Mind Games at Beijing in December 2014.

Cheek died at his home in Las Vegas, Nevada, on December 24, 2024, at the age of 66.

== Bridge accomplishments ==
=== Wins ===
2019 Platinum Pairs,

Yeh Bros. Cup 2017

- North American Bridge Championships (5)
  - Wernher Open Pairs (1) 2002
  - Nail Life Master Open Pairs (1) 2013
  - Vanderbilt (1) 2012
  - Keohane North American Swiss Teams (1) 2008
  - Reisinger (1) 2006

=== Runners-up ===
- North American Bridge Championships
  - von Zedtwitz Life Master Pairs (1) 2002
  - Wernher Open Pairs (1) 1994
  - Nail Life Master Open Pairs (1) 1996
  - Grand National Teams (1) 1997
  - Jacoby Open Swiss Teams (1) 1997
  - Vanderbilt (1) 2011
  - Keohane North American Swiss Teams (1) 1999
  - Chicago Mixed Board-a-Match (1) 2001
