= Fred Stewart (bridge) =

American bridge player (born 1948)

Fredrick M. "Fred" Stewart (born 1948) is an American bridge player from Bloomington, New York. Stewart has won the Cavendish Invitational Pairs three times and has won 8 North American Bridge Championships .

== Bridge accomplishments ==
=== Wins ===
- Cavendish Invitational Pairs (3) 1993, 1996, 2011
- North American Bridge Championships (8)
  - von Zedtwitz Life Master Pairs (1) 1981
  - Wernher Open Pairs (1) 1995
  - Blue Ribbon Pairs (1) 1987
  - Jacoby Open Swiss Teams (2) 1992, 2012
  - Senior Knockout Teams (1) 2012
  - Mitchell Board-a-Match Teams (1) 1995
  - Reisinger (1) 1984

=== Runners-up ===
- Cavendish Invitational Pairs (1) 1986
- North American Bridge Championships (7)
  - Wernher Open Pairs (1) 2004
  - Blue Ribbon Pairs (2) 1994, 2002
  - Grand National Teams (1) 1991
  - Vanderbilt (1) 1999
  - Senior Knockout Teams (1) 2010
  - Reisinger (1) 1995
