= Bobby Nail =

American bridge player

George Robert Nail (April 21, 1925 – May 25, 1995) was an American bridge player and a club owner and teacher in Houston, Texas.

Nail was born in Kansas City, Missouri, with the congenital bone disorder osteogenesis imperfecta. In the 1960s he moved to Houston, where he operated Nail's Bridge Center with his wife Betty until his death. He died of a heart attack on May 25, 1995, survived by his wife and a sister.

Nail won four American Contract Bridge League national championships and placed second eleven times. He represented the United States twice in the Bermuda Bowl, finishing second in 1963. He was inducted into the ACBL Hall of Fame in 2001. The Nail Life Master Open Pairs event is named after him.

Nail and Robert Stucker invented the Big Diamond bidding system and presented it in the 1965 book Revolution in Bridge. A major departure from Standard American bidding concepts of the day, it featured a weak notrump, an unbalanced big 1♦ opening and a 1♣ opening that was forcing but not necessarily strong.

== Publications ==
- Revolution in Bridge: Featuring the big diamond and the fantastic no trump, Nail and Robert Stucker (San Antonio: Naylor, 1965), 325 pp.; ASIN B0007IX8GI

== Bridge accomplishments ==
=== Honors ===
- ACBL Hall of Fame, 2001

=== Wins ===
- North American Bridge Championships (5)
  - von Zedtwitz Life Master Pairs (1) 1974
  - Nail Life Master Open Pairs (1) 1974
  - Vanderbilt (1) 1967
  - Marcus Cup (1) 1948
  - Spingold (1) 1953

=== Runners-up ===
- North American Bridge Championships
  - von Zedtwitz Life Master Pairs (1) 1979
  - Silodor Open Pairs (1) 1970
  - Wernher Open Pairs (1) 1949
  - Blue Ribbon Pairs (1) 1980
  - North American Pairs (1) 1989
  - Jacoby Open Swiss Teams (1) 1988
  - Vanderbilt (1) 1985
  - Mitchell Board-a-Match Teams (2) 1961, 1964
  - Reisinger (1) 1960
  - Spingold (1) 1962
