= Silodor Open Pairs =

National bridge championship

The Silodor Open Pairs national bridge championship is held at the spring American Contract Bridge League (ACBL) North American Bridge Championship (NABC).

The Silodor Open Pairs is a four session matchpoint (MP) pairs event with two qualifying and two final sessions. The event typically starts on the first Friday of the NABC. The event is open.

== History ==
The Silodor Open Pairs is a four-session event consisting of two qualifying and two final sessions. The winners' names are engraved on the Silodor Trophy, presented in memory of Sidney Silodor, winner of the Bermuda Bowl, the McKenney Trophy and more than 30 North American championships.

Silodor, a member of the team that won the first Bermuda Bowl World Championship in 1950, won the Vanderbilt eight times, the Reisinger six times, the Spingold, the Open Pairs and the Master Mixed Teams three times each and the Mixed Pairs five times --- a record.

Silodor was an original member of the ACBL Hall of Fame, elected in the Sixties when the institution was the province of its creator, The Bridge World magazine.

The trophy was presented in 1963 in memory of Silodor and made retroactive to include winners of the event, which began in 1958.

== Winners ==
Winners of Open Pairs (1958–1991)
Year	Winners	Runners-up
1958	Leonard Harmon, Ivar Stakgold	Alvin Roth, Tobias Stone
1959	Lew Mathe, Edward Taylor	Harry Fishbein, Charles Solomon
1960	Robert Jordan, Alvin Roth	Carol Sanders, Tommy Sanders
1961	Mark Hodges, Hampton Hume	Jack Denny, John Simon
1962	Robert Jordan, Arthur Robinson	Mike Michaels, Mike Shuman
1963	Norman Kay, Sidney Silodor	Daniel Rotman, Ivar Stakgold
1964	Barry Crane, Oswald Jacoby	Ivan Erdos, Lew Mathe
1965	John Biddle, James Wisemiller	Ivan Erdos, Tobias Stone
1966	Edgar Kaplan, Norman Kay	Alvin Roth, Bill Root
1967	Harvey Cohen, Maury Genud	Philip Feldesman, Lew Mathe
1968	Ronald Blau, Richard Spero	Harry Fishbein, Charles Solomon
1969	Richard Freedman, James Mathis	David Sachs, Sue Sachs
1970	Barry Crane, John Fisher	Gerald Michaud, Bobby Nail
1971	1/2. Barry Crane, John Fisher; 1/2. Joan Remey, Vincent Remey	
1972	1/2. Barry Crane, John Fisher; 1/2. Matt Granovetter, Merle Tom	
1973	Michael Hoffman, Jack Rhatigan	Charlie Peres, Daniel Rotman
1974	Barry Crane, John Fisher	Ron Andersen, Hugh MacLean
1975	Garey Hayden, Daniel Hyland	Don Piafsky, Dave Saltsman
1976	Terry Hause, Ernest Ivey	Barry Crane, John Fisher
1977	Barry Crane, Peter Rank	John Ashton, Troy Horton
1978	Bobby Levin, Mike Passell	Marty Arndt, Thomas Peters
1979	Jeff Meckstroth, Eric Rodwell	Larry N. Cohen, Dan Zirker
1980	Paul Lewis, Michael Schreiber	Jim Robison, Stelios Touchtidis
1981	Dan Gerstman, Marc Nathan	Ed Manfield, Kit Woolsey
1982	Gerald Caravelli, Craig Janitschke	Dan Gerstman, Marc Nathan
1983	Barry Crane, Mike Passell	Dave Berkowitz, Dan Gerstman
1984	Lou Bluhm, Bart Bramley	Barry Crane, Gerald Caravelli
1985	Jim Robison, Joey Silver	John Roberts, Dave Berkowitz
1986	Lew Stansby, Ralph Katz	Robb Gordon, John Rengstorff
1987	Ed Manfield, Kit Woolsey	Lyle Poe, Steve Carton
1988	Ron Rubin, Michael Becker	Bob Hamman, Paul Lewis
1989	Kit Woolsey, Ed Manfield	Ed Nagy, Jeff Polisner
1990	Don Campbell, Barry Harper	Randy Joyce, Glenn Lublin
1991	Larry Mori, Henry Bethe	Zia Mahmood, Fred Chang

Winners of Open Pairs I (1992–)
Year	Winners	Runners-up
1992	Bernie Miller, Mike Lucas	Geoff Hampson, Mark Molson
1993	Russ Ekeblad, Peter Weichsel	Richard Schwartz, Drew Casen
1994	Lloyd Arvedon, Allan Falk	Zia Mahmood, Michael Rosenberg
1995	Evan Bailey, John Strauch	Seymon Deutsch, Tony Forrester
1996	Ralph Katz, Howard Weinstein	Ed Manfield, Kit Woolsey
1997	Eric Greco, Geoff Hampson	Tony Forrester, Geir Helgemo
1998	Tony Forrester, Geir Helgemo	Mike Becker, Mike Kamil
1999	Mike Passell, Michael Seamon	Bob Hamman, Petra Hamman
2000	Mike Cappelletti Jr., Larry Hicks	Walter Johnson, Doug Simson
2001	Jim Tritt, Richard Meffley	Henry Bethe, Varis Carey
2002	Jörgen Molberg, Boerre Lund	David Berkowitz, Larry N. Cohen
2003	Ralph Katz, Michael Rosenberg	Marty Fleisher, Mike Kamil
2004	David Berkowitz, Larry N. Cohen	Roger Lord, Jacqueline Sincoff
2005	Bob Morris, Eddie Wold	George Jacobs, Alfredo Versace
2006	David Berkowitz, Larry N. Cohen	Fred Chang, Zia Mahmood
2007	Giorgio Duboin, Roy Welland	Richard Freeman, Zia Mahmood
2008	Robert Lebi, Dan Jacob	Ralph Buchalter, Migry Zur Campanile
2009	David Berkowitz, Larry N. Cohen	Xiaodong Shi, David Yang
2010	Nicolas L Ecuyer, Steve Landen	Joe Kivel, Chris Larsen
2011	Gavin Wolpert, Joel Wooldridge	Jill Levin, Jill Meyers
2012	Dennis Bilde, Hans Christian Graverson	Boye Brogeland, Erik Saelensminde
2013	David Bakhshi, Billy Cohen	Robert Giragosian, Larry Robbins
2014	John Diamond, Geoff Hampson	Richard Budd, Zachary Grossack
2015	Steve Weinstein, Bobby Levin	Wael Mohsen, Reda Wasfi Yaacoub
2016	Jeff Meckstroth, Eric Rodwell	John Kranyak, Phyllis Fireman
2017	Mikael Rimstedt, Zachary Grossack	Alon Birman, Dror Padon
2018	Simon Cope, Peter Crouch	Robert Schachter, Paul Meerschaert
2019	Richard Oshlag, Mark Dahl	Michael Rosenberg, Adam Grossack

== Sources ==
"ACBL - NABC Winners". acbl.com. ACBL. Archived from the original on 4 February 2012.

List of previous winners, Page 8 Daily Bulletin (PDF), vol. 52–1, March 13, 2009

2009 winners, Page 1 Daily Bulletin (PDF), vol. 52–3, March 15, 2009, archived from the original (PDF) on November 29, 2014
