= Buffett Cup =

Bridge trophy

The Buffett Cup is a bridge trophy which is awarded biennially in an event between teams from Europe and the United States.

The tournament is modeled on the Ryder Cup golf competition and is held in the week preceding the golf event at a nearby location. The competition was first held in 2006 and is named after its sponsor, American businessman Warren Buffett. Teams are selected by invitation and must contain at least two female players. The competition format is a mixture of teams of four, pairs and individual sessions with point-a-board scoring throughout.

The tournament was scheduled to be held in Monaco in 2014, but was cancelled owing to disagreement within the USA side as to how members of its team were chosen.

The Buffett Cup was resumed in 2019 in Haikou, China. Besides the Europe and USA teams, the China team is also invited for the first time to the Buffett Cup.

== Results ==
=== Summary ===
Team	Winner	1st Runners-up	2nd Runners-up
China	--	--	1
Europe	1	4	--
United States	4	1	--

=== By Year ===
Year	Winner
2006	United States
2008	Europe
2010	United States
2012	United States
2019	United States

=== 2006 Dublin, Ireland ===
USA won by 23.

Europe
(England) Paul Hackett (PC)	England
(Germany) Sabine Auken	Germany
(Italy) Norberto Bocchi	Italy
(Italy) Giorgio Duboin	Italy
(England) Jason Hackett	England
(England) Justin Hackett	England
(Republic of Ireland) Tom Hanlon	Ireland
(Norway) Geir Helgemo	Norway
(Norway) Tor Helness	Norway
(Netherlands) Jan Jansma	Netherlands
(Republic of Ireland) Hugh McGann	Ireland
(Netherlands) Louk Verhees Jr.	Netherlands
(Germany) Daniela von Arnim	Germany

USA
(United States) Donna Compton (NPC)
David Berkowitz
Larry N. Cohen
Fred Gitelman
Bob Hamman
Geoff Hampson
Bobby Levin
Jill Levin
Zia Mahmood
Jill Meyers
Paul Soloway
Steve Weinstein
Roy Welland

=== 2008 Louisville, Kentucky, USA ===
Europe won 205.5-172.5.

Europe
(England) Paul Hackett (NPC)	England
(Germany) Sabine Auken	Germany
(France) Michel Bessis	France
(France) Thomas Bessis	France
(Norway) Boye Brogeland	Norway
(Republic of Ireland) Tom Hanlon	Ireland
(Norway) Tor Helness	Norway
(Poland) Michał Kwiecień	Poland
(Norway) Espen Lindqvist	Norway
(Republic of Ireland) Hugh McGann	Ireland
(Netherlands) Marion Michielsen	Netherlands
(Poland) Jacek Pszczoła	Poland
(Norway) Jan Peter Svendsen	Norway

USA
(United States) Donna Compton (NPC)
David Berkowitz
Björn Fallenius
Richard Freeman
Steve Garner
Bob Hamman
Geoff Hampson
Zia Mahmood
Janice Seamon-Molson
Tobi Sokolow
Alan Sontag
Howard Weinstein
Roy Welland

=== 2010 Cardiff, Wales ===
USA won 109-89.

Europe
(England) Paul Hackett (NPC)	England
(Germany) Sabine Auken	Germany
(Norway) Boye Brogeland	Norway
(Italy) Giorgio Duboin	Italy
(Italy) Fulvio Fantoni	Italy
(England) Jason Hackett	England
(England) Justin Hackett	England
(Norway) Geir Helgemo	Norway
(Norway) Tor Helness	Norway
(Italy) Claudio Nunes	Italy
(Norway) Erik Saelensminde	Norway
(Italy) Antonio Sementa	Italy
(Germany) Daniela Von Arnim	Germany

USA
(United States) Donna Compton (NPC)
David Berkowitz
Fred Gitelman
Bob Hamman
Geoff Hampson
Bobby Levin
Jill Levin
Zia Mahmood
Jeff Meckstroth
Jill Meyers
Eric Rodwell
Alan Sontag
Steve Weinstein

=== 2012 Omaha, Nebraska ===
USA won 107-103.

Europe
(Republic of Ireland) Paul Porteous (NPC)	Ireland
(France) Michel Bessis	France
(France) Thomas Bessis	France
(England) Sally Brock	England
(Monaco) Fulvio Fantoni	Monaco
(England) Paul Hackett	England
(Republic of Ireland) Tom Hanlon	Ireland
(Bulgaria) Kalin Karaivanov	Bulgaria
(Monaco) Claudio Nunes	Monaco
(England) Nicola Smith	England
(Bulgaria) Rumen Trendafilov	Bulgaria

USA
(United States) Donna Compton (NPC)
David Berkowitz
Curtis Cheek
Joe Grue
Bob Hamman
John Hurd
Marc Jacobus
Justin Lall
Jill Levin
Brad Moss
Alan Sontag

=== 2019 Haikou, Hainan Province, China ===
(1st) USA - 972.3; (2nd) Europe - 967.7; (3rd) China - 953

China
Jianjian Wang (NPC)
Jianming Dai
Lixin Yang
Chuancheng Ju
Zhengjun Shi
Meng Kang
Xiaojing Wang
Wenfei Wang
Qi Shen

Europe
(England) Paul Hackett (NPC)	England
(England) Sally Brock	England
(England) Jason Hackett	England
(England) Justin Hackett	England
(Sweden) Frederic Wrang	Sweden
(England) Fiona Brown	England
(Portugal) Antonio Palma	Portugal
(Netherlands) Louk Verhees	Netherlands
(Netherlands) Ricco Van Prooijen	Netherlands

(United States) USA
Peggy Kaplan (NPC)
Bob Hamman
Peter Weichsel
Bart Bramley
Kit Woolsey
Oren Kriegel
Ron Smith
Jill Meyers
Sylvia Shi
