= Nail Life Master Open Pairs =

North American bridge championship

The Nail Life Master Open Pairs is a North American bridge championship held at the fall American Contract Bridge League (ACBL) North American Bridge Championship (NABC).

The championship is a Matchpoints pairs event restricted to players with a Life Master rating. It consists of two qualifying sessions and two final sessions, typically starting on the first Friday of the NABC.

== History ==
The Nail Life Master Open Pairs has its roots in 1961 when a new championship event was created for male players with a rank of National Master or higher.

In 1963, the rank for eligibility was increased to Life Master and in 1990, it became an open event so that female players with Life Masters status could also compete. Before and after opening to women, this tournament and the LM Women's Pairs have been structured and scheduled in parallel. Several women enter the open event and 1987 Women's winner Jill Meyers is a two-time Open winner.

The event is named after Bobby Nail, a 1974 winner.

== Winners ==
Winners of Life Master Men's Pairs (1961–1989)
Year	Winners	Runners-up
1961	G. Gard Hays, Max Manchester	Martin J. Cohn, Hampton Hume
1962	Sam Fuoto, Victor Mitchell	Hal Kandler, Kelsey Petterson
1963	Sami Kehela, Eric Murray	Harry Fishbein, Charles J. Solomon
1964	Charles Coon, Bobby Goldman	2/3. Mervin Key, Harold Rockaway; 2/3. Jack Blair, William Christian
1965	Paul Soloway, Alex Tschekaloff	Edgar Kaplan, Victor Mitchell
1966	Carl Hudecek, Ray Zoller	Gaylor Kasle, Ed Theus
1967	Harlow S. Lewis, Peter Pender	Donald R. Faskow, Bill Flannery
1968	Henry Bethe, John Solodar	Don Pearson, John Swanson
1969	Chuck Burger, Jimmy Cayne	Norman H. Fischer, Christopher G. Jeans
1970	Ron Andersen, Hugh MacLean	Curtis Smith, E. Lowell Yost
1971	Alan Sontag, Peter Weichsel	Steve Robinson, Kit Woolsey
1972	Les Bart, Marc Jacobus	Steve Robinson, Kit Woolsey
1973	Edgar Kaplan, Norman Kay	Roxy Violin, Ed Weiner
1974	Gerald L. Michaud, Bobby Nail	John Gerber, Daniel Kaim
1975	Steve Lapides, Walt Walvick	Marc Culbertson, Robert Visokey
1976	Roger Bates, John Mohan	Steve Altman, Thomas M. Smith
1977	David Hoffner, David Schroeder	Roger Bates, John Mohan
1978	Norm Coombs, Tom Hodapp	Kevin Castner, Mike Lawrence
1979	Jeff Meckstroth, Eric Rodwell	Zeke Jabbour, Dennis McGarry
1980	Craig Janitschke, Jan Janitschke	Bob Hamman, Paul Swanson
1981	Roger Abelson, Mike Levinson	Bob Hamman, Donald P. Krauss
1982	Bobby Lipsitz, Dan Gerstman	Lew Mathe, Harold Guiver
1983	Marty Bergen, Larry N. Cohen	Mitch Chandler, Cliff Bishop
1984	Per-Olof Sundelin, Peter Pender	Jim Becker, Howard Chandross
1985	John Mohan, Roger Bates	Jeff Meckstroth, Eric Rodwell
1986	Jim Krekorian, Paul Kiefer	Marty Bergen, Larry N. Cohen
1987	Bart Bramley, Lou Bluhm	Leslie West, David Ashley
1988	Bobby Levin, Larry T. Cohen	Glen Lublin, Peter Boyd
1989	Steve Lapides, Walt Walvick	Peter Weichsel, Roger Stern

Before and after opening to women in 1990, this event has been structured and scheduled parallel to the LM Women's Pairs.

Winners of Life Master Open Pairs (1990–)
Year	Winners	Runners-up
1990	Zia Mahmood, Hugh Ross	Tommy Gullberg, Michael Polowan
1991	Zia Mahmood, Hugh Ross	Larry N. Cohen, David Berkowitz
1992	Mike Kamil, Michael Rosenberg	Jeff Meckstroth, Eric Rodwell
1993	Brad Moss, Ravindra Murthy	Ed Nagy, Jeff Polisner
1994	Bobby Levin, Richard Katz	Michael Polowan, Steve Robinson
1995	Bart Bramley, John Sutherlin	Mark Itabashi, Gene Simpson
1996	Walter Schafer Jr., Ron L. Smith	Michael Schreiber, Curtis Cheek
1997	Jeff Schuett, Kerry Smith	Dennis Kasle, Garey Hayden
1998	JoAnna Stansby, Lew Stansby	Ron Smith, Richard Schwartz
1999	Steve Catlett, Paul Soloway	JoAnna Stansby, Lew Stansby
2000	Steve Garner, Jill Meyers	Zia Mahmood, Chuck Burger
2001	Piotr Gawryś, Jacek Pszczoła	Zia Mahmood, Sidney Lazard
2002	Eric Greco, Geoff Hampson	Larry N. Cohen, Steve Weinstein
2003	Kyle Larsen, Jo Morse	Fred Gitelman, Jay Borker
2004	Richard Pavlicek, Richard Pavlicek Jr.	Jonathan Green, Mark Aquino
2005	Zia Mahmood, Jill Meyers	Bobby Levin, Louk Verhees
2006	Steve Garner, Howard Weinstein	John Armstrong, Paul Hackett
2007	Björn Fallenius, Zia Mahmood	Alex Perlin, Michael Prahin
2008	Nikolay Demirev, Ralph Katz	John Diamond, Eric Rodwell
2009	Martin Andresen, Tor Helness	Hemant Lall, Justin Lall
2010	Kazuo Furuta, Hiroaki Miura	Fred Gitelman, Brad Moss
2011	Justin Lall, Ishmael Del'Monte	Doug Doub, Adam Wildavsky
2012	Zia Mahmood, Chip Martel	Cecilia Rimstedt, Meike Wortel
2013	Curtis Cheek, Ishmael Del'Monte	Kevin Bathurst, Bobby Levin
2014	James Krekorian, Venkatrao Koneru	Wael Mohsen, Reda Wasfi Yaacoub
2015	Eric Greco, Geoff Hampson	Kevin Castner, David Gold
2016	Marion Michielsen, Zia Mahmood	Tom Hanlon, Leslie Amoils
2017	Alon Birman, Dennis Bilde	Quentin Robert, Godefroy De Tessieres
2018	Greg Hinze, David Grainger	Boye Brogeland, David Gold
2019	Radu Nistor, Iulian Rotaru	Igor Savchenko, Alex Perlin
2020	Competition not held (COVID-19)	Competition not held (COVID-19)
2021	Phillip Becker, Kenneth Kranyak	Olin Hubert, Kevin Collins
2022	Shan Huan, Kevin Dwyer Rimstedt	Stefan Skorchev, Bogdan Vulcan
2023	Oscar Nijssen, Luc Tijssen	Haig Tchamitch, Billy Cohen
2024	David Berkowitz, Jeff Meckstroth	Janice Seamon-Molson, Sylvia Shi
2025	Joel Wooldridge, Andrew Hoskins	Steven Ashe, Harrison Luba

== See also ==
- Smith Life Master Women's Pairs
- Von Zedtwitz Life Master Pairs

== Sources ==
"ACBL - NABC Winners". acbl.com. ACBL. Archived from the original on 4 February 2012. "ACBL - NABC Winners Nail Life Master Pairs". acbl.com. ACBL. List of previous winners, Page 8 Daily Bulletin (PDF), vol. 81–1, November 21, 2008

2008 winners, Page 1 Daily Bulletin (PDF), vol. 81–3, November 23, 2008, archived from the original (PDF) on December 3, 2008
