= Bobby Levin =

American contract bridge player

Robert J. (Bobby) Levin
- Born: November 19, 1957 (age 68)
- Occupation: Professional bridge player
- Spouse: Jill Levin
- Children: Andrew (son), Shane, and Justin Blanchard (stepsons)

Robert J. (Bobby) Levin (born November 19, 1957) is an American professional bridge player, from Aventura, Florida. He was the youngest winner of the Bermuda Bowl world championship for national teams from 1981 until 2015, when 19-year old Michal Klukowski of Poland succeeded him. Levin is also a five-time winner of the Cavendish Invitational Pairs, the world's leading contest for cash prizes, with his regular partner Steve Weinstein. As of June 2013, Levin ranks number 20 among Open World Grand Masters and his wife Jill ranks number 21 among Women World Grand Masters.

Levin–Weinstein were one-third of USA1 (Note: From 1991 the U.S. is represented by two teams in the biennial Bermuda Bowl tournament, which now comprises 22 teams. The United States playoff winner is commonly designated 'USA1' and the runner-up 'USA2' but they contend equally for the world championship.) in the 2011 Bermuda Bowl, where they finished fourth. Beginning mid-2012 they joined Nick Nickell's team. The professional teams hired by Nickell had won four of the preceding nine biennial Bermuda Bowls, from 1995.

== Career ==
Levin was born in Southampton, Long Island, New York. As a 13-year-old, he won the first tournament event he ever entered – the Men's Pairs at a New York sectional – making him the youngest winner in the history of the event.

When Levin was 15, the family moved to Miami. In March 1973, he became the youngest life master in the history of the American Contract Bridge League (ACBL) at the age of 15 years and 4 months, a record since broken. Once in Miami, Levin met two players – Billy Seamon and Russell Arnold – who had a profound influence on his bridge career. By the age of 17, Levin was playing professionally on teams with Arnold, sponsored by Bud Reinhold.

In 1979, his team (Reinhold, Arnold, Jeff Meckstroth and Eric Rodwell) tied for first in the Reisinger Board-a-Match Teams. Because the Reisinger was a qualifying event for the playoff to determine North America's representative in the world championship (ACBL team trials), a playoff between the Reisinger winners was necessary; they lost to the Dallas Aces comprising Ira Rubin, Fred Hamilton, Bob Hamman and Bobby Wolff.

Next spring the Reinhold team won the Vanderbilt Knockout Teams in Fresno, California, qualifying for the team trials. The squad easily won the right later that year to represent the United States in the 1981 Bermuda Bowl in Port Chester, New York. The team added John Solodar and defeated Zia Mahmood-led Pakistan for the championship. The win made Levin, at 23 years old, the youngest world champion at the time, a distinction he held for 34 years, until 19 year old Michal Klukowski's win with the 2015 champion Polish team.

About a year later, Levin moved to Chicago to work as an options trader. When the market crashed in 1987, Levin was back to Florida, entering the real estate business with one of his brothers. He moved to the Orlando area in 1988 and lived there for twelve years.

His regular partner is Steve Weinstein, who is also a world class poker player. When forming their partnership, they spent a week with Marty Bergen in Florida to put together their system.

Levin and his wife since January 1998, Jill, who is also a world champion bridge player, reside in Lake Ariel, Pennsylvania (as of 2010). Bobby's son Andrew is a college student and Jill's sons Shane and Justin Blanchard are "upcoming bridge players" (as of 2010).

== Bridge accomplishments ==
=== Awards ===
- ACBL Player of the Year, 2014
- Herman Trophy 1979
- ACBL King of Bridge 1975

=== Wins ===
- Bermuda Bowl (1) 1981
- World Open Pairs Championship (1) 2010
- North American Bridge Championships (33)
  - Vanderbilt (6) 1980, 1989, 2009, 2011, 2014, 2017
  - Spingold (1) 1992
  - Reisinger (1) 1979, 2021
  - Grand National Teams (3) 1997, 1999, 2000
  - Open Board-a-Match Teams (2) 1996, 2006
  - Men's Board-a-Match Teams (1) 1987
  - Jacoby Open Swiss Teams (2) 2005, 2006
  - Master Mixed Teams (1) 1987
  - Blue Ribbon Pairs (2) 1979, 2018
  - Life Master Pairs (3) 1989, 1994, 2001
  - Life Master Open Pairs (1) 1994
  - Life Master Men's Pairs (1) 1988
  - Open Pairs (2) 1978, 2015
  - Open Pairs II (1) 1993
  - IMP Pairs (1) 2003
  - Fast Open Pairs (1) 2007
  - Roth Open Swiss Teams (1) 2010
  - Norman Kay Platinum Pairs (2) 2014, 2018
- United States Bridge Championships (5)
  - Open Team Trials (5) 1980, 1993, 2010, 2014, 2017
- European Open Bridge Championships (1)
  - Mixed Teams (1) 2003
- Other notable wins:
  - Buffett Cup (2) 2006, 2010
  - Cavendish Invitational Teams (3) 1999, 2005, 2008
  - Pan American Open Teams (1) 1992
  - Sunday Times–Macallan Invitational Pairs (1) 1993
  - Cavendish Invitational Pairs (5) 1999, 2002, 2007, 2009, 2010

=== Runners-up ===
- World Transnational Open Teams (1) 2000
- World Open Pairs (1) 2006
- World Mixed Pairs (1) 2006
- North American Bridge Championships (29)
  - Vanderbilt (5) 1984, 2000, 2010, 2018, 2019
  - Spingold (3) 1988, 1991, 2012
  - Grand National Teams (3) 1978, 1992, 2007
  - Open Board-a-Match Teams (3) 1990, 2012, 2013
  - Men's Board-a-Match Teams (1) 1983
  - Open Swiss Teams (2) 2008, 2018
  - Blue Ribbon Pairs (4) 1987, 1988, 2000, 2004
  - Life Master Open Pairs (2) 2005, 2013
  - Open Pairs II (1) 1999
  - Men's Pairs (1) 1986
  - Senior Knockout Teams (2) 2017, 2018
  - Jacoby Open Swiss Teams (1) 2016
  - Reisinger (1) 2014
- United States Bridge Championships (2)
  - Open Team Trials (2) 2000, 2017
- Other notable 2nd places:
  - Cavendish Invitational Teams (3) 2000, 2006, 2009
  - Cap Gemini World Top Invitational Pairs (1) 2000
  - Macallan Invitational Pairs (1) 1994
  - Cavendish Invitational Pairs (1) 1994
