= Roger Bates =

American bridge player

Roger Bates (born 1947) is an American bridge player.

== Bridge accomplishments ==
=== Awards ===
- Mott-Smith Trophy (3) 1975, 1988, 1992

=== Wins ===
- North American Bridge Championships (12)
  - Blue Ribbon Pairs (1) 1971
  - Nail Life Master Open Pairs (2) 1976, 1985
  - Jacoby Open Swiss Teams (2) 1985, 1987
  - Vanderbilt (4) 1975, 1976, 1988, 1992
  - Senior Knockout Teams (1) 2010
  - Keohane North American Swiss Teams (1) 1990
  - Spingold (1) 1976

=== Runners-up ===
- North American Bridge Championships
  - Blue Ribbon Pairs (2) 1974, 1989
  - Nail Life Master Open Pairs (1) 1977
  - Grand National Teams (2) 1989, 2002
  - Jacoby Open Swiss Teams (1) 2011
  - Truscott Senior Swiss Teams (1) 2011
  - Senior Knockout Teams (1) 2011
  - Mitchell Board-a-Match Teams (2) 1975, 1985
  - Reisinger (1) 1981
  - Roth Open Swiss Teams (1) 2009
