= Gavin Wolpert =

American bridge player

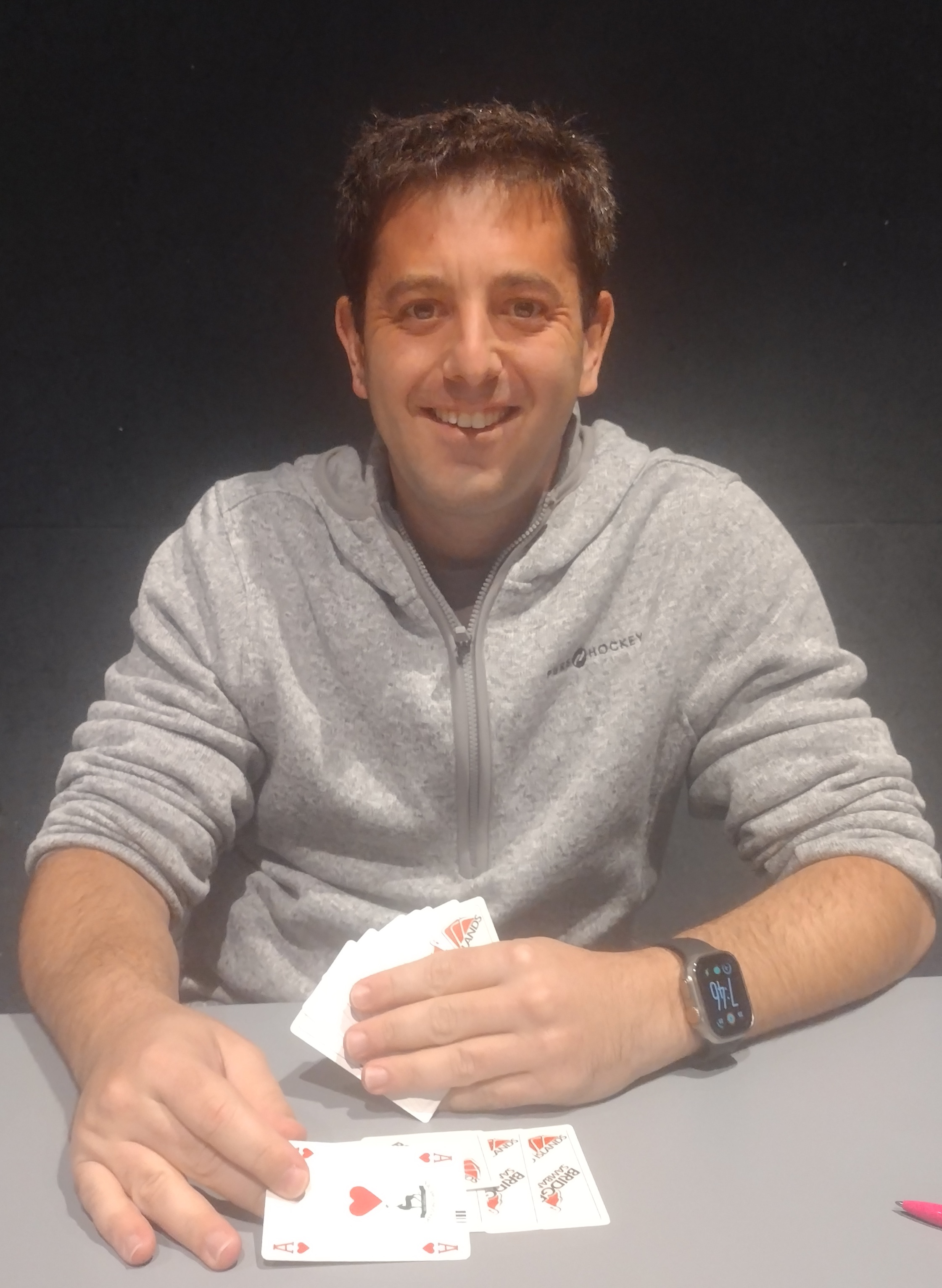
- Gavin Wolpert at the Iceland Bridge Festival, January 2024

Gavin Wolpert (born 1984 in Toronto, Ontario) is a Canadian-American professional bridge player.

== Personal life ==
Gavin Wolpert was born in Toronto, Ontario to a bridge playing family. His mother Hazel, a bridge teacher, started to teach him bridge at the age of seven. Later he trained with the Canadian junior bridge team, and subsequently moved to Florida.

He is married to Jenny Wolpert, formerly Jenny Ryman of Sweden, another professional player. They have three children.

== Bridge accomplishments ==
=== Awards ===
- ACBL King or Queen of Bridge (1) 2000

=== Wins ===
- North American Bridge Championships (9)
  - Silodor Open Pairs (1) 2011
  - Blue Ribbon Pairs (1) 2005
  - North American Pairs (1) 2013
  - Keohane North American Swiss Teams (1) 2004
  - Chicago Mixed Board-a-Match (1) 2009
  - Roth Open Swiss Teams (2) 2009, 2014
  - Soloway Knockout Teams (2) 2021, 2025
- World Bridge Games
  - Transnational Teams (1) 2024

=== Runners-up ===
- North American Bridge Championships
  - Keohane North American Swiss Teams (1) 2012
  - Spingold (1) 2004
