= Zachary Grossack =

American bridge player

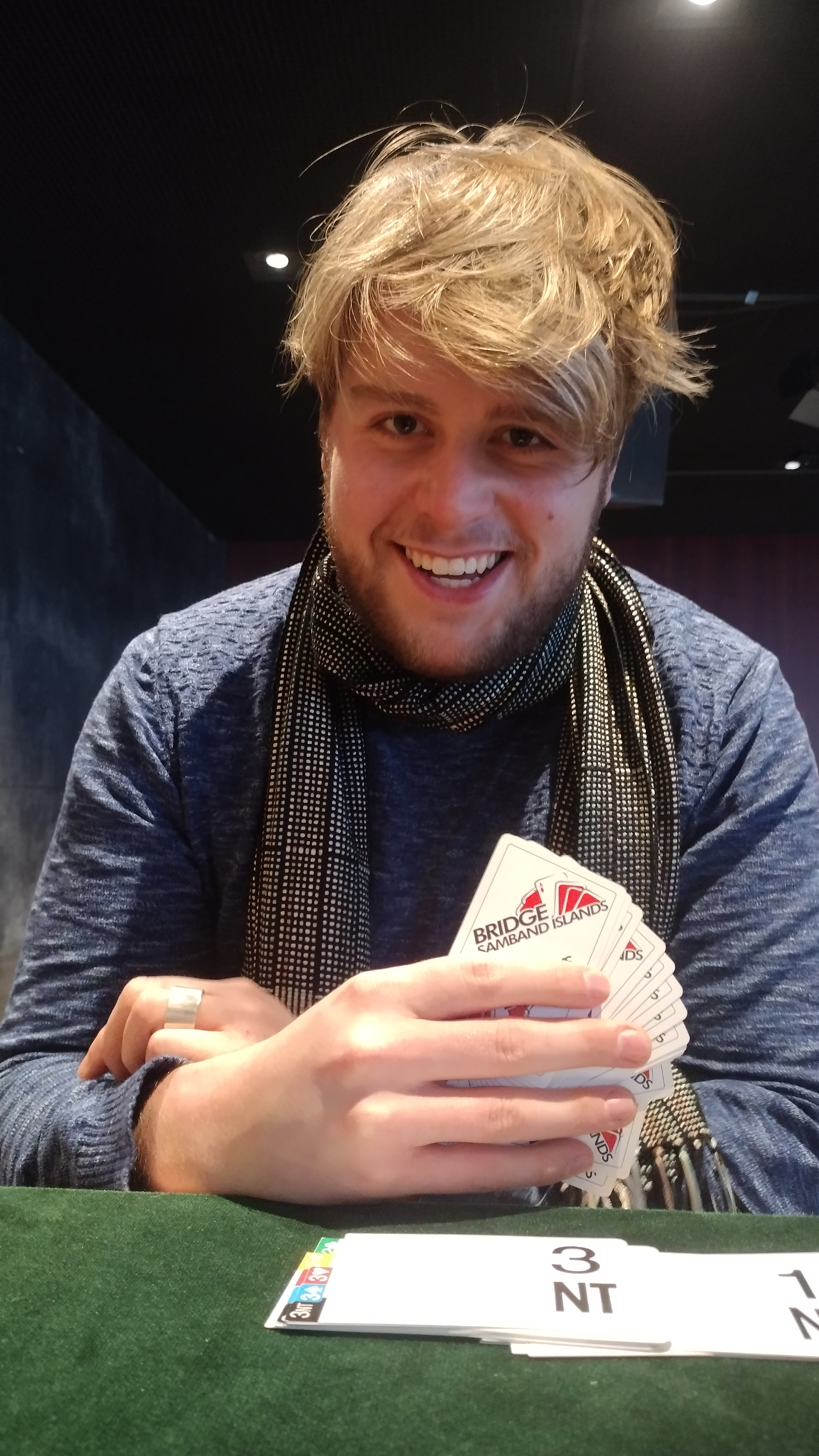
- Zachary Grossack at the World Bridge Tour event in Iceland, January 2024
- Born: Zachary Grossack; May 20, 1997 (age 28); Boston, MA

Zachary "Zach" Grossack (born 1997) is an American professional bridge player from Boston. He is currently the youngest Grand Life Master in the American Contract Bridge League (ACBL). He has won three World Youth championship and one World Under 26 championship and multiple North American Bridge titles.

Zach was on the cover of the ACBL Bulletin (monthly magazine) in October 2019 and February 2023. He was the ACBL Player of the Year (winner of the most platinum Masterpoints in North American Bridge Championship) for 2022.

== Bridge accomplishments ==
=== Wins ===
- World Bridge Championships (2)
  - World Youth Open Bridge Championships Swiss Teams (1) 2013
  - World Youth Under-26 Championship (1) 2022
- North American Bridge Championships (6)
  - Fast Open Pairs (1) 2014
  - Grand National Teams (1) 2016
  - North American Pairs (1) 2018
  - Roth Open Swiss Teams (1) 2022
  - Norman Kay Platinum Pairs (1) 2022
  - Jacoby Open Swiss Teams (1) 2022

=== Runners-up ===
- World Bridge Championships (1)
  - World Junior Team Championships (1) 2012
- North American Bridge Championships (1)
  - Silodor Open Pairs (1) 2014

== Personal life ==
Zach is the son of Richard and Jori. He has two brothers, Adam, who is also a Bridge player, and Sam.

Zach, along with his brother Adam, were both featured in the bridge documentary "Double Dummy" and had a cameo appearance in the poker documentary "Matusow".
