= Björn Fallenius =

Björn Fallenius (1957-2023) was a Swedish bridge player, for many years a resident of New York City. He and his late wife Kathy Fallenius operated the Cavendish Bridge Club.

In world championship teams-of-four competition, Fallenius represented Sweden and won bronze medals in the 1987 and 1991 Bermuda Bowls and the 1988 World Team Olympiad. He also won bronze medals in the 1986 and 1998 Rosenblum Cups (on all-Swedish teams, although that quadrennial event is not nationally representative).

In pairs competition, Fallenius and Peter Fredin won the European Bridge League Open Pairs in 2009 and finished second in the 2010 World Open Pairs (silver medal). Fredin and Kathy Fallenius have played together in the World Mixed Pairs.

== Bridge accomplishments ==
=== Awards ===
- Fishbein Trophy (1) 2006

=== Wins ===
- North American Bridge Championships (11)
  - von Zedtwitz Life Master Pairs (1) 2006
  - Wernher Open Pairs (1) 1998
  - Blue Ribbon Pairs (1) 2009
  - Nail Life Master Open Pairs (1) 2007
  - Jacoby Open Swiss Teams (1) 1996
  - Vanderbilt (1) 2007
  - Mitchell Board-a-Match Teams (1) 2005
  - Reisinger (2) 1991, 2001
  - Roth Open Swiss Teams (1) 2006
  - Spingold (1) 2003

=== Runners-up ===
- North American Bridge Championships
  - Jacoby Open Swiss Teams (1) 2002
  - Roth Open Swiss Teams (1) 2011
  - Vanderbilt (2) 1993, 2006
  - Mitchell Board-a-Match Teams (2) 2002, 2004
  - Chicago Mixed Board-a-Match (1) 1992
  - Reisinger (1) 2003
