= Steve Weinstein =

American contract bridge and poker player

Steve Weinstein (born 1964) is an American professional bridge and poker player. He is known best as the youngest winner of the ACBL Life Master Pairs at the time that he achieved it, and the most frequent winner of the Cavendish Invitational Pairs, the world's leading contest for cash prizes. As of March 2022, the World Bridge Federation shows Weinstein at number 22 in the Open World Grand Masters rankings. His highest ranking was 16th, in October 2011.

== Life ==
Weinstein was born in New York state in 1964. In 1981, at the age of 17, he became the youngest winner of any North American Bridge Championship, the ACBL's annual Life Master Pairs, playing with his stepfather Fred Stewart.

Weinstein and Liz Davis have been together since 1986, married since 1993. They live in Andes, New York.

Weinstein worked on Wall Street until 2002 when he became a full-time professional bridge and poker player. He played poker as 'Thorladen' and mentored others. "I take top young bridge players and I train them to be top poker players", he told Online Poker in 2007. One of them was Gavin Wolpert; in 2010 Wolpert and another player created Bridge Winners, an online news and networking site for bridge players, which Weinstein immediately joined.

== Bridge career ==
Ten years after the Life Master Pairs championship, Stewart–Weinstein were one-third of a team (USA2) (Note: Occasionally from 1983 and continuously from 1991, the United States is represented by two teams in the biennial Bermuda Bowl tournament, which comprises 22 teams from 2003. The United States playoff winner is commonly designated 'USA1' and the runner-up 'USA2' but they contend equally for the world championship.) that represented the U.S. in the world championship for national teams, the 1991 Bermuda Bowl, where they reached the quarterfinal. They won the Cavendish Pairs in 1993 and again in 1996.

Weinstein's regular partner for more than a decade is Bobby Levin, who may still be known best as the youngest winner of a world teams championship, the 1981 Bermuda Bowl. When forming their partnership, they spent a week with Marty Bergen in Florida to put together their system.

Levin–Weinstein have won the Cavendish Pairs five times from 1999. In the WBF World Championships Open Pairs they finished 11th in 2002, second in 2006, and first in 2010.

They were one-third of USA1 in the 2011 Bermuda Bowl, where they finished fourth. Beginning mid-2012 they joined Nick Nickell's team. The professional teams hired by Nickell had won four of the preceding nine biennial Bermuda Bowls, from 1995.

== Bridge accomplishments ==
=== Awards ===
- ACBL King of Bridge, 1982
- ACBL Player of the Year, 1995

=== Wins ===
- World Bridge Championships (2)
  - Rosenblum Cup 2022
  - World Open Pairs 2010
- European Open Bridge Championships (1)
  - Mixed Teams (1) 2003
- Other notable wins:
  - Pan American Open Teams (1) 1992
  - Sunday Times–Macallan Invitational Pairs (1) 1993
- North American Bridge Championships
  - Vanderbilt (4) 2009, 2011, 2014, 2017
  - Reisinger (1) 1984
  - Open Board-a-Match Teams (2) 1995, 2006
  - Jacoby Open Swiss Teams (3) 1992, 2005, 2006
  - Roth Open Swiss Teams (1) 2010
  - Blue Ribbon Pairs (1) 1987, 2013
  - Life Master Pairs (2) 1981, 2001
  - Open Pairs II (1) 1995
  - IMP Pairs (1) 2003
  - Norman Kay Platinum Pairs (1) 2018
- United States Bridge Championships
  - Open Team Trials (3) 2010, 2014, 2017
- Other notable wins:
  - Buffett Cup (2) 2006, 2010
  - Cavendish Invitational Teams (3) 1999, 2005, 2008
  - Cavendish Invitational Pairs (7) 1993, 1996, 1999, 2002, 2007, 2009, 2010

=== Runners-up ===
- World Open Pairs (1) 2006
- North American Bridge Championships (12)
  - Vanderbilt (4) 2000, 2010, 2018, 2019
  - Grand National Teams (1) 1991
  - Open Swiss Teams (1) 2008
  - Blue Ribbon Pairs (3) 1994, 2000, 2004
  - Life Master Open Pairs (1) 2002
  - Open Pairs II (1) 1999
  - Von Zedtwitz Life Master Pairs (1) 2022
- Other notable 2nd places:
  - Cavendish Invitational Teams (3) 2000, 2006, 2009
  - Cavendish Invitational Pairs (3) 1986, 1998, 2011
