= Michał Kwiecień =

Polish bridge player

Michał Kwiecień (born March 1, 1957) is a Polish bridge player. Kwiecień won the 1998 World Open Pairs Championship with Jacek Pszczoła.
