= Fisher and Schwartz cheating scandal =

Scandal in international professional contract bridge

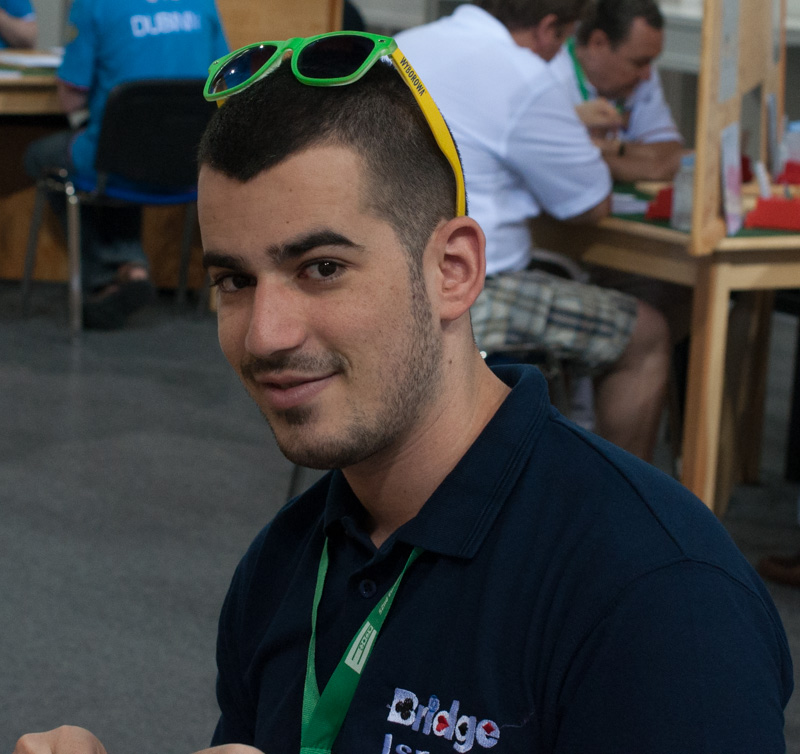
Lotan Fisher, June 2014

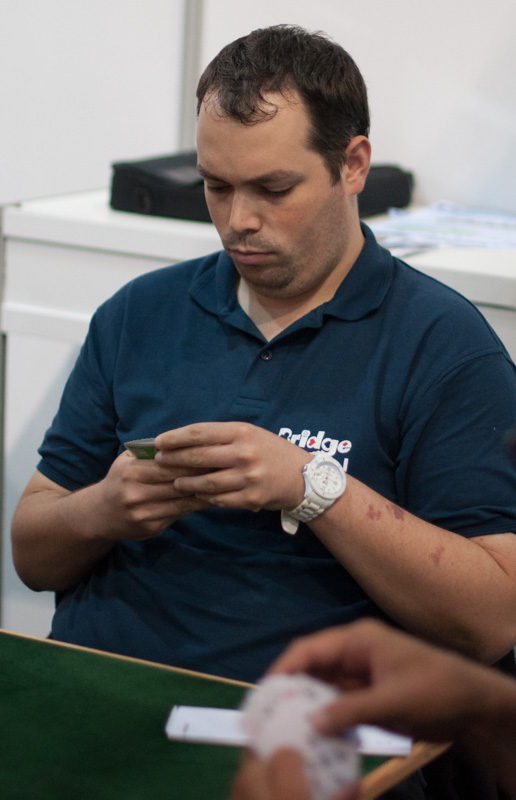
Ron Schwartz, June 2014

In August 2015, Boye Brogeland's bridge team (Richard Schwartz, Allan Graves, Boye Brogeland, Espen Lindqvist, Huub Bertens, Daniel Korbel) lost in the quarter-finals of the Spingold knock-out team event to Jimmy Cayne's team (James Cayne, Michael Seamon, Lotan Fisher, Ron Schwartz, Alfredo Versace, Lorenzo Lauria) by 1 IMP following an appeal that lost his team 2 IMPs. The appeal involved Lotan Fisher and Ron Schwartz, Brogeland's teammates from the previous year when they won the Spingold. Brogeland spent the following day reviewing the Vugraph records from the quarter-final and concluded that Fisher and Schwartz were cheating and later that month created a web site and publicly accused them of cheating.

In September 2015, Per-Ola Cullin, a Swedish international bridge player, postulated that after removing the board from the bidding tray, Fisher and Schwartz placed it in particular locations as a code to indicate strength in a suit. The analysis was based on video from the European Bridge Team Championship in Croatia in 2014.

Both the European Bridge League and the Israel Bridge Federation conducted an investigation into the allegations. The Israel Bridge Federation hearings also includes an allegation related to coughing. On September 5, 2015, Israel withdrew its team for the upcoming Bermuda Bowl in Bali. They were replaced by Sweden.

In May 2016 three Israeli experts announced what they believe is a refinement to the Cullin code. The experts include Dr. Netzer Zeidenberg, a computer scientist and Amir Levin, Israel's 2003 bridge champion. Fisher and Schwartz responded, "We are innocent of any crime and we will fight for our innocence. We already successfully passed a polygraph that proved that we are innocent."

The decision of the European Bridge League Disciplinary Committee was released on May 18, 2016. Fisher and Schwartz were banned from all European Bridge League events for a period of five years, and banned from playing as a partnership for life.

On July 28, 2016, the American Contract Bridge League (ACBL) announced that its Ethical Oversight Committee (chair: Jon Brissman; other members: Cheri Bjerkan, Dennis Clerkin, Lesley Davis, Bruce Ferguson, Bob Glasson, Hendrik Sharples and Eddie Wold) had unanimously found Fisher and Schwartz guilty both of collusive cheating and of giving false information to the ACBL about previous disciplinary convictions. In consequence, Fisher and Schwartz were expelled from the ACBL, and all their masterpoints, titles, ranks and privileges declared forfeit. Further, their partners and teammates were subject to mandatory forfeiture of all masterpoints, titles and ranks earned during the four years preceding the final of the 2015 Spingold Trophy. On July 29, 2016, the ACBL clarified and corrected that announcement: forfeiture by partners and teammates applied only to events in which they had played with Fisher or Schwartz, and only to the four years preceding the date of the decision, namely July 27, 2016.

On August 8, 2016, the Israeli Special Ethics Committee unanimously found Fisher and Schwartz guilty of signaling by means of board placement and on February 14, 2017, announced that Fisher and Schwartz are permanently banned from play and participation in any activities within the Israeli Bridge Federation.

== See also ==
- Cheating in bridge
- Fantoni and Nunes cheating scandal
- Lotan Fisher
- Ron Schwartz
