= Boye Brogeland =

Norwegian bridge player

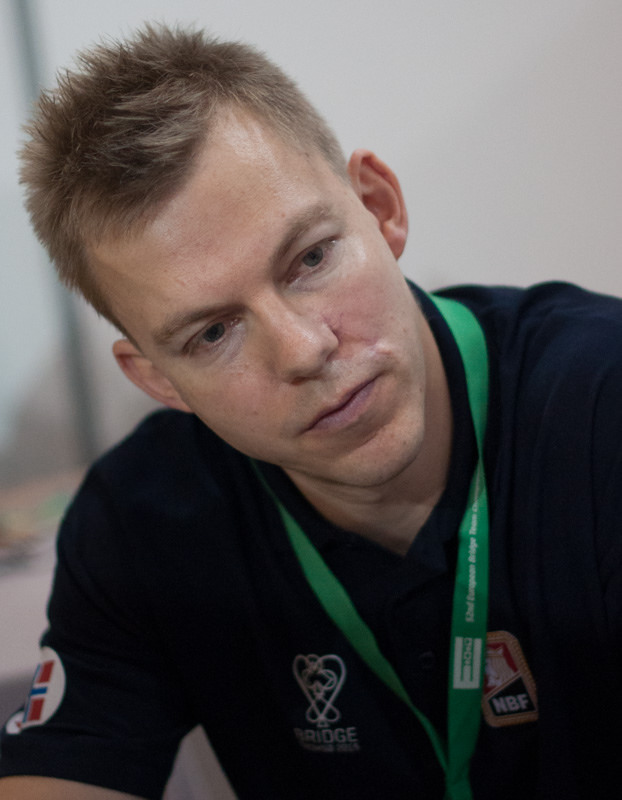
Boye Brogeland in 2014

Boye Brogeland (born 1973) is a Norwegian professional bridge player. After a successful junior career, he won three Bermuda Bowl medals with the Norwegian team, including the gold in Shanghai 2007, and several North American Bridge Championships. He came into public focus in 2015 when he led a campaign against cheating in bridge, exposing wrongdoing by several top pairs, for which he received public recognition.

== Biography ==
Brogeland was born in 1973 in Moi, a small village in Lund Municipality, located about 100 kilometres (62 mi) southeast of the city of Stavanger in southern Norway. His mother was a schoolteacher and his father was a butcher. He learned to play bridge from his grandparents at the age of 8, and started playing regularly in the local club when he was 12. His mother committed suicide when Boye was eleven, and the tragedy had a "decisive influence on his character", as he put it. He graduated economics from the Norwegian School of Economics.

At the age of 19, Brogeland turned fully to bridge and achieved a successful career as a junior, winning World Junior Pairs Championships in Ghent in 1995. In the same competition two years later, in Sportilia, Italy, he took a bronze medal with his partner Trond Hantveit. Playing for Norway junior team, in 1996 he won Junior European Teams in Cardiff, and in 1997 finished second to Denmark in the 6th World Youth Championship in Hamilton, Ontario in Canada.

With Norwegian Open team and Erik Sælensminde as the partner, Brogeland took the bronze medal in the 1997 Bermuda Bowl in Hammamet, followed by silver in Paris 2001 and culminating with the gold in Shanghai 2007.

In 2001, Brogeland turned fully professional and participates regularly in North American Bridge Championships. He has won two pairs events and two team events, the most important being Spingold in 2014, a title he would eventually relinquish.

Brogeland holds the titles of Norwegian Grand Master, European Grand Master and World Grand Master.

Boye lives with his wife Tonje Aasand Brogeland, a schoolteacher and a fellow bridge player, in Flekkefjord in southwest Norway. They have two children. His son Anders Brogeland also plays bridge. He runs a bridge magazine Bridge in Norway (Bridge i Norge). In 2011 co-authored the book Bridge at the Edge on his bridge achievements with David Bird.

== Anti-cheating campaign ==
Brogeland came into public focus with his 2015 campaign to eliminate cheating from the top echelons of bridge. The campaign started when Brogeland learned that Israeli players Lotan Fisher and Ron Schwartz, his former teammates at several North American Bridge Championships, were widely rumoured to use illegal methods to exchange information about their hands, which gave them unfair advantage over the opponents. With Schwartz and Fisher as teammates Brogeland had won July 2014 Spingold, November 2014 Reisinger and Jacoby Open Swiss Teams in March 2015. After an investigation of his own, he went on to publicly accuse Schwartz and Fisher of cheating. In August 2015 he registered a domain, bridgecheaters.com, on which he subsequently provided evidence that Schwartz and Fisher colluded to exchange information by specific placement of board and tray, one of only few pieces of equipment visible behind the screen visually separating the partners. Brogeland and his teammates Richie Schwartz (Note: Richie Schwartz is unrelated to Ron Schwartz) (American entrepreneur and the team sponsor), Allan Graves, and Espen Lindqvist agreed to relinquish all their NABC titles won with Schwartz and Fisher.

Brogeland's evidence was corroborated by several participants of the Bridge Winners website, one of the largest bridge forums. Hundreds of hours of publicly available video material from several matches were searched via crowdsourcing for evidence about foul play from Schwartz–Fisher and other accused pairs.

Fisher and Schwartz were subsequently banned from all European Bridge League events in May 2016 by its Disciplinary Commission for a period of five years, and banned from playing as a partnership for life. As of May 2016, the appeals process is still pending.

The focus of Brogeland and the "crowdsourcing" team moved to other world top pairs. Evidence about wrongdoing of Fulvio Fantoni and Claudio Nunes, Italians playing for Monaco and ranked No. 1 in the world at the time, soon emerged. Maaijke Mevius, a national-level Dutch player and a scientist, noticed a correlation between horizontal or vertical orientation of the card they played and their honour holdings in the suit. She emailed the evidence to Brogeland, who, upon consultation with Ishmael Del'Monte, an expert on cheating, and American player Brad Moss, decided to issue an ultimatum to Fantoni, a personal acquaintance of his, to come forward with a confession before the findings are published. On 13 September 2016, American expert Kit Woolsey published an article on Bridge Winners demonstrating a sound statistical proof of Mevius's findings. The accused pair refused to issue a public statement, but Monaco withdrew from the upcoming Bermuda Bowl World Championship. Fantoni/Nunes were subsequently suspended by the ACBL and the EBL.

Brogeland received an anonymous tip about wrongdoing by a top German pair Alex Smirnov–Josef Piekarek and a Polish pair Cezary Balicki–Adam Żmudziński, also rumoured to indulge in foul play. Faced with the evidence, Smirnov and Piekarek decided to come forward and confess. On 26 September 2015, one day before play was due to start, the World Bridge Federation Credentials Committee withdrew the invitation to Balicki and Żmudziński to play in the 2015 Bermuda Bowl in Chennai, India, without giving a reason. In several articles titled "The Videos Shout: Balicki-Zmudzinski", posted in October and November 2015, Kit Woolsey published an extensive evidence found by the crowdsourcing team and cross-checked by a panel of experts, that they used narrow or wide placement of cards from the bidding box to communicate the relative strength of their hand. As of May 2016, the EBL is still "studying the suspicions against Balicki-Żmudziński and report on this is expected soon". On May 30, 2016, the EBL announced that "EBL President Yves Aubry has taken the decision to refer this case to the EBL Disciplinary Commission as the pair is suspected of committing infractions of the laws of Bridge".

For his role in the campaign, Brogeland was named Personality of the Year 2015 by the International Bridge Press Association, and his associates were given the Alan Truscott Award. He was awarded the 2016 Sidney H. Lazard Jr. Sportsmanship Award by the ACBL, established by Sidney Lazard.

== Bridge accomplishments ==
=== Awards ===
- Fishbein Trophy (2) 2014, 2017

=== Wins ===
- 1995 World Championships Junior Pairs
- 1996 European Championships Junior Teams
- 2005 European Championships Mixed Teams
- 2008 European Championships
- 2018 European Championships
- 2024 European Championships
- Bermuda Bowl (1) 2007
- Buffett Cup (1) 2008
- North American Bridge Championships (5)
  - von Zedtwitz Life Master Pairs (1) 2010
  - Lebhar IMP Pairs (1) 2007
  - Jacoby Open Swiss Teams (1) 2013
  - Spingold (2) 2014, 2017
  - Reisinger Board-a-Match Teams (1) 2014

=== Runners-up ===
- 1997 World Championships Junior Teams
- 2001 European Championships
- 2002 Cap Gemini Invitational (Pairs)
- Bermuda Bowl (2) 2001, 2023
- Buffett Cup (1) 2010
- North American Bridge Championships (4)
  - Silodor Open Pairs (1) 2012
  - Jacoby Open Swiss Teams (1) 2009
  - Von Zedtwitz Life Master Pairs (1) 2017
  - Mitchell Board-a-Match Teams (1) 2016

== See also ==
- Cheating in bridge
