= Cheating in sports =

Cheating in sports may refer to:

- Age fraud in association football
- Cheating
- Cheating at the Olympic Games
- Cheating at the Paralympic Games
- Cheating in baseball
- Cheating in bridge
- Cheating in chess
- Cheating in esports
- Cheating in online games
- Cheating in pigeon racing
- Cheating in poker
- Cheating in video games
- Doping at the Olympic Games
- Doping at the Tour de France
- Doping in sport
- Doping in tennis
- Mechanical doping
- Performance enhancing substances

== See also ==
- 1994 Formula One cheating controversy
- 2019 college admissions bribery scandal
- Boxing at the 2016 Summer Olympics#Judging
- Fisher and Schwartz cheating scandal
- Fantoni and Nunes cheating scandal
- List of Australian sports controversies
- List of Philippine sports controversies
- McLaren Report
- Mitchell Report
- Valve Anti-Cheat
- Blowout in sports
