= Fantoni and Nunes cheating scandal =

2015 contract bridge cheating scandal

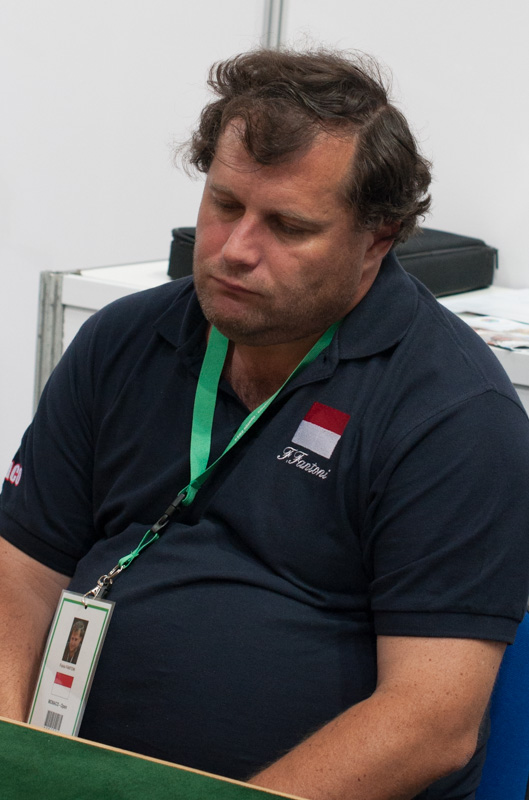
Fulvio Fantoni in 2014

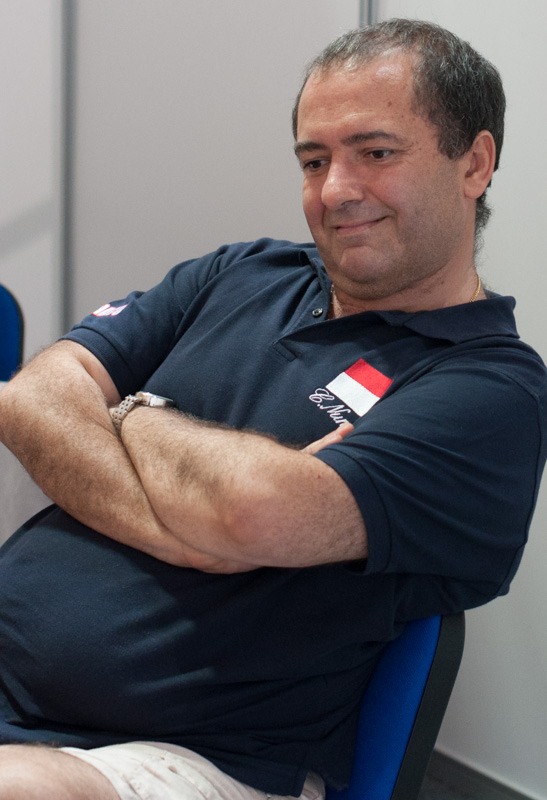
Claudio Nunes in 2014

Fulvio Fantoni and Claudio Nunes are professional bridge players originally from Italy, but since 2011 playing for Monaco.

In 2015, they were ranked No. 1 and No. 2 in the world respectively.

In September 2015, they were publicly accused of cheating by orienting a played card to show a missing high honour (ace, king or queen) in the led suit at the European Bridge Championship in 2014. Three separate investigations were conducted, one by the Italian Bridge Federation (FIGB), one by the European Bridge League (EBL) and one by the American Contract Bridge League (ACBL).

On March 19, 2016, the FIGB banned the pair for three years. The FIGB hearing also investigated cheating by Fantoni and Nunes against Italy in the finals of the Bermuda Bowl in 2013 using the same method. Fantoni and Nunes appealed this ruling to both the FIGB and the Italian Olympic Committee; the appeals were rejected. In July 2018 FIGB revoked the judgment.

On July 18, 2016, the European Bridge League (EBL) banned each from play for five years.

On July 26, 2016, the American Contract Bridge League (ACBL) expelled them from their league and stripped them of all related masterpoints, titles, ranks and privileges.

The players' appeal to the Court of Arbitration for Sport against the EBL ban resulted in a judgment in their favour in January 2018. Only the ACBL sanction remains in force, and the EBL publicly stated that they were still barred from all EBL events at least until April 2019. However the Federal Appeal Tribunal of the FIGB subsequently lifted the players' suspension from FIGB events.

When the Italian National team had Fantoni in the team in 2021, all other competing teams boycotted them and refused to play against them, leading to the Italian team winning by default without playing any bridge.

== Procedures ==
In Italy, cheating allegations and hearings related to the game of contract bridge have three stages of proceedings: 1st – Italian Bridge Federation (la Federazione Italiana Giuoco Bridge, FIGB); 2nd – Federal Court of Appeals (Corte d’Appello Federale); 3rd – Italian National Olympic Committee (Comitato Olimpico Nazionale Italiano, CONI) under its Sport Guarantor's Committee (Collegio di Garanzia dello Sport).

As a member of the European Bridge League, the Monaco Bridge Federation is subject to its disciplinary procedures.

== Previous allegations ==
=== The "black-out" deal ===
On May 1, 2015, during the Italian Open Teams Championship, Nunes made a defensive play which enabled him and Fantoni to defeat opponents' slam contract by three tricks. The play, and the rapidity with which it was made, were considered sufficiently unusual for the deal to be referred by FIGB to the National Sports Judge for adjudication. The charge was transmission of unauthorized information. The judge, a lawyer by profession, heard evidence from witnesses of fact and expert evidence from bridge players. Nunes said in his defense that he had had 'un momento di "obnubilamento"' (English: a moment of clouding) or '"black-out"'. On June 12, 2015, the judge handed down a reasoned written decision in which he addressed both the facts and the law. He concluded that illegal transmission of information had not been proved and acquitted Fantoni and Nunes; no appeal was filed. The Italian proceedings have been summarised in English.

== Card orientation signals ==
Maaijke Mevius, a Dutch national-level bridge player and eminent scientist, noticed a correlation between horizontal or vertical orientation of the cards played by Fulvio Fantoni and Claudio Nunes and their honor holdings in the suit. In brief, the hypothesis was that a card played vertically signaled the presence of an otherwise unknown honor card (A, K or Q) in the suit, and that a card played horizontally denied it. In September 2015, Mevius emailed the evidence to Boye Brogeland, who, after consultation with Ishmael Del'Monte, Australian bridge professional and vice-chair of the WBF High Level Players Commission, and American player Brad Moss, decided to issue an ultimatum to Fantoni, a personal acquaintance of his, to come forward with a confession before the findings were published. No such confession was made.

On September 13, 2015, American expert Kit Woolsey published an article on the Bridge Winners website demonstrating a statistical proof of Mevius's hypothesis. The allegations were reported both by official bridge organizations and in mainstream media.

=== Monaco withdraws from 2015 Bermuda Bowl ===
Monaco was to have been represented at the 2015 Bermuda Bowl in Chennai, India by a team consisting of Fulvio Fantoni, Claudio Nunes, Geir Helgemo, Tor Helness, Franck Multon and playing captain Pierre Zimmermann. In recognition of the controversy caused by the public allegations against Fantoni and Nunes, the Monegasque Bridge Federation decided to withdraw from the Bermuda Bowl 2015 "in order to preserve the interests of bridge and so that the event may be played with the greatest serenity." On September 16, 2015, the World Bridge Federation announced that Monaco would be replaced by Denmark.

=== Boycott of Italy in European Bridge League qualification event ===
In August 2021 Fantoni was included as a replacement player in the Italy squad for the European Online Bridge Team Championship. Every other competing team refused to play against Italy during the event.

=== Hearings ===
FIGB Hearings: On March 19, 2016, the Italian Bridge Federation (FIGB) issued a three-year ban against each player. On June 10, 2016, the Corte d’Appello Federale upheld the decision. On July 19, 2016, Fantoni and Nunes submitted an appeal to the Italian Olympic Committee (CONI) against the FIGB ban, which the CONI eventually rejected on October 4, 2016.

EBL Hearings: On July 18, 2016 Fantoni and Nunes were banned from all European Bridge League events by its Disciplinary Commission for a period of five years, and banned from playing as a partnership for life. The English Bridge Union (EBU) report of the EBL ruling of July 18, 2016 includes a link to a YouTube video made by EBU website designer Michael Clark "showing the incidents taking place", focusing on Fantoni's opening leads.

ACBL Hearings: During the summer North American Bridge Championships held in Washington, D.C., the American Contract Bridge League (ACBL) held a three-day hearing regarding the accusations made against Fantoni-Nunes. On July 26, 2016, the American Contract Bridge League (ACBL) announced that the ACBL Ethical Oversight Committee had unanimously found that overwhelming evidence established that Fantoni and Nunes had engaged in collusive cheating. In consequence, the latter were expelled from the ACBL and stripped of all their ACBL masterpoints, titles, ranks and privileges. Further, their partners and teammates were subject to mandatory forfeiture of all masterpoints, titles and ranks earned during the four years preceding the final of the 2015 Spingold Trophy. On July 29, 2016, the ACBL clarified and corrected that announcement: forfeiture by partners and teammates applied only to events in which they had played with Fantoni or Nunes, and only to the four years preceding the date of the decision; namely, July 24, 2016. Partly due to the Fantoni-Nunes case, the ACBL created a permanent anti-cheating committee.

Court of Arbitration for Sport and EBL and FIGB reaction: On April 26 and 27, 2017, the Court of Arbitration for Sport conducted a hearing, Fulvio Fantoni & Claudio Nunes v. European Bridge League (EBL). In January 2018 the Court of Arbitration for Sport published its judgement on the players' appeal. It found in their favour, saying that:

"the majority of the Panel concludes that the exchange of information through the Code has not been proven to its comfortable satisfaction and rules that the appeal filed by the Players shall be upheld. Such conclusion does not mean that the players are innocent of any wrongdoing, it only means that the EBL did not manage to prove to the comfortable satisfaction of the majority of the Panel that the Players committed an infraction of the EBL Rules."

The EBL clarified that the pair were still barred from play at least until April 2019. It is considering making changes to its rules on eligibility for future EBL championships. In the light of the CAS verdict, the Federal Appeal Tribunal of the FIGB subsequently lifted the players' suspension. Fantoni and Nunes have said that they do not intend to play together in the future.

== See also ==
- Cheating in bridge
- Fisher and Schwartz cheating scandal
- Fulvio Fantoni
- Claudio Nunes
