= Pierre Zimmermann =

Pierre Zimmermann is the name of:

- Pierre-Joseph-Guillaume Zimmermann (1785–1853), French pianist, composer and teacher
- Pierre Zimmermann (bridge), Monegasque bridge player
