= Huub Bertens =

Dutch bridge player

Hubertus Johannes Antoinetta (Huub) Bertens (born 24 May 1960) is a Dutch professional bridge player from Tilburg, Netherlands. Bertens has won numerous national and some international tournaments including the Cavendish Invitational, NEC Cup, the Yeh Brothers Cup, the European Open Team Championships. In world championships for national teams, he earned a Bronze medal in 2007 and played on the Dutch teams that finished 5th to 8th (quarterfinalists) in 2008 and 2009.

His regular partners in the Netherlands included Ton Bakkeren and Berry Westra. Married to Jeanne van den Meiracker, he has one son and one daughter.

Bertens and Curtis Cheek have established a partnership that represented the United States in the SportAccord World Mind Games at Beijing in December 2014.

== Controversy ==
On 31 January 2021, following an investigation into the alleged use of illicit knowledge of deals he was playing in an Invitational Online Bridge Tournament from 30 May 2020 to 3 June 2020, the United States Bridge Federation announced that with immediate effect Bertens is:

1. Barred from membership in the USBF until January 1, 2028, at which time he may reapply for membership in the USBF;
2. On probation for a three-year period commencing on the date, if any, that he is re-admitted as a member of the USBF; and
3. Barred for life from serving on the Board of Directors of the USBF.

== Dutch championships ==
Bertens has won the following Dutch Championships:

- 1986–1987 Champion MK foursome
- 1999–2000 Champion MK foursome
- 2001 NK Mixed foursome
- 2001–2002 Champion MK foursome
- 2003–2004 Champion MK foursome
- 2004–2005 Champion MK foursome
- 2006–2007 Champion MK foursome
- 2007–2008 MK Champion Pairs
- 2009–2010 Champion MK foursome
- 2010 NK Mixed foursome

Runner up in the Champion MK foursome in 1987, 1997, 1998, 1999, 2009 and 2011. Bertens won the Transfer Race, a yearly individual ranking of the best Dutch player, from 2006 to 2009 and in 2011.

== International results ==
Bertens has played on Netherlands teams in world championship tournaments 2000, 2005, 2007, 2008, and 2009. In odd years (Bermuda Bowl) that implies a top-six rank in the preceding European Bridge League open teams championship.

- 2005: 1st place, European Open in Tenerife
- 2006: 1st place (pairs), Cavendish Invitational in Las Vegas with Ton Bakkeren
- 2006: 1st place, Patton Pinkster Tournament at it Onstein with Ton Bakkeren, Vincent Ramondt and Berry Westra
- 2007: 1st place, NEC Cup in Yokohama
- 2007: 1st place, White House Tournament in Amsterdam
- 2007: Bronze medal (Netherlands), World national teams (Bermuda Bowl)
- 2008: 5th place (Netherlands), national teams at the first World Mind Sports Games
- 2009: 1st place, Yeh Bros Cup in Australia with Ton Bakkeren, Sjoert Brink and Bas Drijver
- 2009: 5th place (Netherlands), World Teams Championships (Bermuda Bowl)
- 2011: Quarter final ('t Onstein) World Transnational Teams Championships
- 2020: 1st place, USBF Invitational #1

== See also ==
- Cheating in bridge
