= Zimmermann Immobilier =

Swiss real estate company

Régie Zimmermann S.A.
- Trade name: Zimmermann Immobilier
- Founded: May 2, 1990 in Geneva, Switzerland
- Founder: Pierre Zimmermann
- Key people: Pierre Zimmermann (CEO), Yann Zimmermann (Administrator)
- Number of employees: 55 (2015)
- Website: regiez.ch

Zimmermann Immobilier (Régie Zimmermann S.A.) is a real estate company based in Geneva, Switzerland, specialized in buying, refurbishing, managing and selling rental buildings and apartments. Mostly active in the Canton of Geneva, it manages over two billion CHF worth of real estate assets.

== Key dates ==
- 1990: The Régie Zimmermann S.A. is founded in Geneva by Pierre Zimmermann.
- 2005: An architecture department aiming to build and raise buildings is created within Zimmermann Immobilier.
- 2006: The first subsidiary opens in Lausanne.
- 2012: Zimmermann Immobilier reaches 100 million Swiss francs of annual gross rental income.
