= Pierre Zimmermann (bridge) =

Swiss Monegasque bridge player

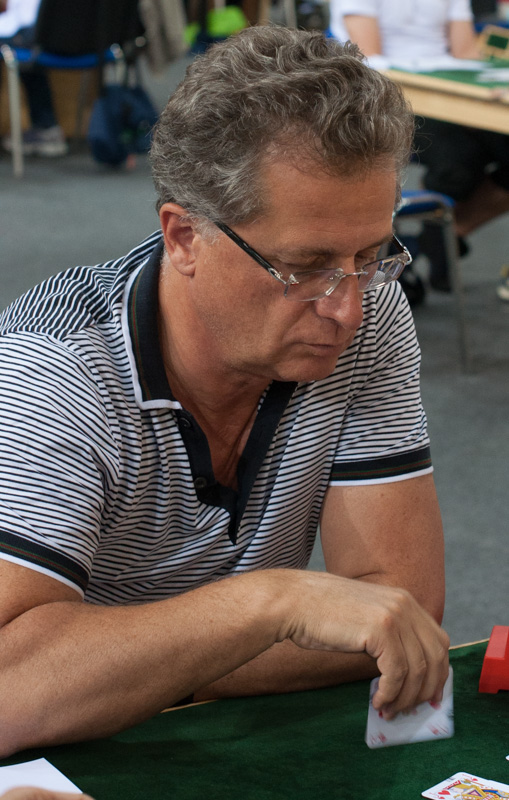
- Zimmermann in 2014
- Born: May 26, 1955 (age 71); Lausanne, Vaud, Switzerland
- Education: HEC Lausanne, EPFL
- Known for: Contract bridge, Real estate
- Children: Tiffany Lea, Maelle, Justin, Laureline, and Yann-Nicolas

Pierre Zimmermann (born 26 May 1955) is a Swiss bridge player, captain of the Swiss national team, number one individual player in the world since September 13, 2021, six-time world champion, nine-time North American champion, ten-time European champion and one-time South American champion. He is also an organizer of tournaments, including the Monaco Cavendish since 2023 and the transnational European winter team championships since 2016, the last in 2024 at Alpe d'Huez.

Pierre Zimmermann is founder and CEO of Zimmermann Immobilier, a real estate company in French-speaking Switzerland (Geneva, Vaud, Valais, Fribourg). He is also co-owner of two French groups, GCK (hydrogen, electricity, motors, batteries, etc.) and Les Étincelles, the largest hotel group in the French Alps.

== Biography ==
Pierre Zimmermann was born in Lausanne, Switzerland on 26 May 1955. He studied mathematics at the École Polytechnique Fédérale de Lausanne from 1973 to 1978 and, at the same time, business administration at HEC Lausanne from 1975 to 1979.

He has five children, including fashion and travel blogger, Tiffany Lea and Yann he had with ex-wife, artist Christine Zimmermann.

=== Professional career ===
In 1979, Pierre Zimmermann joined IBM in Zurich where he worked for five years. He then worked for Hill+Knowlton Strategies as an assistant corporate controller for Europe until 1985. From 1986 to 1988, he worked for Finagrain as a financial analyst, and then joined BBHQ (a venture capital firm) in 1988 again as a financial analyst.

In 1990, Pierre Zimmermann left BBHQ to create the Régie Zimmermann (today known as Zimmermann Immobilier), a real estate company in Geneva. In 2006, he opened a subsidiary in Lausanne.

=== Bridge career ===
Pierre Zimmermann started playing bridge occasionally in 1975 during his studies, but only started to play seriously in 1998. He obtained his first World Champion's title in 2007 in Shanghai his second in 2009 in São Paulo. and his third one in Chennai in 2015.

For several years, Zimmermann partnered with the professional player Franck Multon. Together they formed teams with top professional pairs, most recently Geir Helgemo–Tor Helness of Norway and Fulvio Fantoni–Claudio Nunes of Italy. In 2010 these six players all moved to Monaco in order to establish residency and thus obtain eligibility to compete as a national team in international teams-of-four. They have represented Monaco in European Bridge League (EBL) and world championship tournaments and finished second in the Bermuda Bowl in Bali in 2013. Following controversies over cheating, the Zimmermann team withdrew just prior to competing in the 2015 Bermuda Bowl and after hearings by the EBL, and the CAS judgment Fantoni and Nunes were acquitted because the proofs were inconsistent.

For several years, Zimmermann partnered with the professional player Franck Multon. Together they formed teams with top professional pairs, most recently Sebastiaan Drijver, Sjoert Brink, Michal Tomasz Klukowski and Piotr Stanislaw Gawrys, who form the Swiss team that won the 2022 World Championship. In 2019, these players all moved to Geneva to take up residence and become eligible for international competitions as part of the national team. They represented Switzerland and won one World Championship, two European Championships, one North American Championship and finished second in three European Championships.

Pierre Zimmermann will take second place in the Champions Cup in November 2021 and November 2022. He also finished second at the Madeira 2022 European Nations Championship.

Pierre Zimmermann sponsors the Cavendish (won twice) and Wintergames European Transnational Championships (WG) bridge events in Monaco from 2016 to 2020 and in Tignes from 21 to 27 April 2023. Pierre Zimmermann's ambition is to create a transnational senior championship.

He is a nine-time champion of the North American tournament, a ten-time European champion, a one-time champion of the South American tournament and a six-time world champion.

== Bridge accomplishments ==
=== Gold medals ===
==== World Championships ====
- Bermuda Bowl (World Bridge Teams Championships) 2022, 2023
- Rosenblum Cup (Transnational), 2018
- World Transnational Open Teams Championship 2007, 2009, 2015

==== North America Championships ====
- Vanderbilt 2010
- Reisinger 2012, 2013, 2022
- Spingold 2011, 2012, 2018, 2022
- Soloway Cup 2023

==== South American Championships ====
- South American Bridge Championship, Buenos Aires, 2023

==== European Championships ====
- European Bridge League
  - European Open Championships, mixed teams, 2011
  - European Team Championships, open, 2012, 2021, 2025
  - Wintergames 2016, 2020
  - Champions' Cup, 2016, 2024
  - Winter Transnational 2024, 2025

Divers

- World SportAccord, 2013, Pékin
- Cavendish, 2010 (Las Vegas), 2012 (Monaco)
