= Alcatraz coup =

Illegal game method

The Alcatraz coup is an illegal method of learning about the opponents' cards in contract bridge. It is not a true coup, and the phrase itself is a reference to its supposed provenance: the defunct Alcatraz penitentiary. The "coup" consists of a deliberate revoke by declarer, causing the next player to reveal whether he holds the key card whose location is sought. The declarer then corrects the revoke (which is allowed without penalty if done soon enough) and the defender may change his play, but declarer now knows about the key card and can choose how to finesse accordingly.

== Example ==
Consider this layout of the club suit:

♣ A J 10

♣ K 8

South wants three tricks from clubs but the opponents have been successful in concealing the location of the ♣Q. South calls for the ♣J from dummy, and East follows suit with the ♣3. South now perpetrates the Alcatraz Coup by discarding from a different suit, thus committing a revoke. Then:

- If West follows suit with a small card, South corrects his revoke by replacing his discard with the ♣8. Having scored the ♣J, South now cashes the ♣K and later the ♣A.
- If West plays the ♣Q on dummy's ♣J, South corrects his revoke by replacing his discard with the ♣K. West can now take back his ♣Q, of course, but with the position exposed South confidently finesses West for the ♣Q.

== History of the term ==
Presumably, the idea behind the name is that any bridge player attempting the "coup" should be locked up in a maximum security facility. According to a 1961 article by Albert Morehead:

The classic hand for the Alcatraz Coup, which was not then so called, was the following one adduced in 1947 by Oswald Jacoby of Dallas, who was trying to persuade the laws committees to change the revoke law...

Thus, the name originates some time between 1947 and 1961. In a 1973 article in The Bridge World, Kit Woolsey, describes a fictitious visit by a bridge expert to a bridge tournament at Alcatraz, where he was subject to various tricks by the inmates by means of "gaming the system." Apparently, the coup's name inspired Woolsey to write the article.

== Legal implications ==
According to Morehead's article, "The laws committees have considered the Alcatraz Coup too unusual a case to be dealt with specifically, but it is no less typical of rare irregularities that committees must consider when a new code of laws is being prepared." However, since 1973 when that article was published, there have been changes in the Laws, so that now a remedy is available for use of the Alcatraz coup.

The most relevant change is Law 16C2 (Law 16D2 in the 2007 Laws Of Duplicate Bridge), which defines information gained from either side's legal withdrawal of a card as unauthorized for the offending side. (Note: although the revoking side may correct its revoke, a revoke has nevertheless occurred and therefore there is an "offending side.") It also states that "A player of the offending side may not choose from among logical alternative actions one that could demonstrably have been suggested over another by the unauthorized information." In other words, even if the coup is executed inadvertently, the declarer may not take advantage of knowing the position of the queen; if he does so, the tournament director may adjust the result accordingly.

Also, a deliberate infraction of the Laws is normally viewed as a serious violation of the Proprieties; that exposes deliberate attempters of the Coup to further sanctions.

== See also ==
- Bridge ethics
- Cheating in bridge
