= Fantunes =

Bridge (cards) tactic

In the game of contract bridge Fantunes is a natural bidding system initially developed Carlos Mosca and popularized by Fulvio Fantoni and Claudio Nunes - two players that were later found to be cheating and were banned from play by many bridge federations

The Fantunes system differs in approach from other bidding systems used by world class bridge players. Opening bids of one and two of a suit are stronger than in most systems, with one level suit openings natural and forcing one round, and constructive two-level openings. The one notrump opening denotes a balanced or semi-balanced hand with 12-14 HCP which can include a singleton or a five-card major suit.

Opening one of a suit is natural but forcing, unlimited in strength that contains at least 14 high-card points (HCP). An exception is made for opening 1♠ or 1♥ with as little as 11 HCP when holding five cards in the bid suit and four cards in the other major. For an example of such a "light" opening bid, holding ♠ AJ853 ♥ J10852 ♦ 9 ♣ KQ, second seat with both vulnerable, Nunes opened 1♠ and alerted it as 14+ HCP or 11+ with 4+♥ (along with the 5+♠ promised by the opening bid). The 14-HCP minimum for an opening one bid is only a guideline; a hand with much "playing strength" (for example, a hand rich in aces and kings, long suits or a solid pattern of sequential cards) can be opened one of suit with fewer HCP. Here are three examples where they opened one of a suit without 14 HCP.

♠ 8 ♥ AQJ1082 ♦ AJ72 ♣ 64 was opened 1♥
♠ Q10982 ♥ 64 ♦ AKQJ107 ♣ — was opened 1♦
♠ A1076 ♥ 7 ♦ AKQ532 ♣ 103 was opened 1♦

Opening one notrump (1NT) means 12–14 HCP and a balanced or semi-balanced hand, possibly a singleton with three four-cards suits and can include a five-card major.

Opening two in a suit is natural, showing a hand with unbalanced distribution and limited strength. In the first and second seat, two level opening bids denote a two-suited hand that includes at least a five-card suit, or a six-card or longer suit (if that hand is not adequate for a 1NT opening). Such 2-bids occur with a high frequency, and put much pressure on the opponents. Unlike other two-level openings in modern systems, which are usually limited to 6-10 HCP in strength, the 2-level opener can act more than once in a competitive auction either by bidding his other suit(s) or with a takeout double. In third seat the two level opening bids, particularly in the majors, have a much wider range, and can be as few as six HCP. On Bridge Base Online they are alerting such 3rd seat opening bids as 6-13 HCP.

Other features of the system are Gambling 3NT, Negative 3NT, TURBO 4NT/5NT and RKCB for slam bidding.
