= Claudio Nunes =

Italian professional bridge player (born 1968)

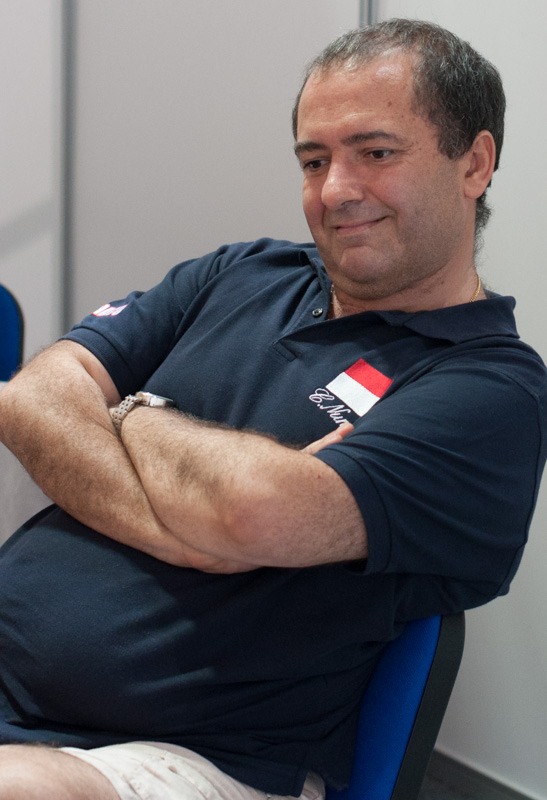
Claudio Nunes (2014)

Claudio Nunes (born 23 March 1968) is an Italian professional bridge player.

He is a five-time world champion, a World Grand Master of the World Bridge Federation (WBF), and the WBF second-ranked player as of April 2011. He is one of 10 players who have won the Triple Crown of Bridge.

Nunes was born in Rome. His regular partner for many years is Fulvio Fantoni, the first-ranked World Grand Master (April 2011). Fantoni-Nunes are generally regarded as one of the top pairs worldwide. They play "Fantunes", for their surnames, an innovative bidding system characterised by natural but forcing one-level opening bids in all four suits. The pair was implicated in a cheating scandal in 2015 resulting in sanctions against them.

== Emigration to Monaco ==
Starting in 2011, Fantoni and Nunes were full-time members of a team led and paid by the Swiss real-estate tycoon Pierre Zimmermann, under contract expiring 2016. From 2012 all six members would be citizens of Monaco and the team would represent Monaco internationally. The team finished third in the 2010 world championship, not yet full-time, and competed in the 2011 European Bridge League open championship (neither is a national teams event).

== Cheating scandal ==
In September 2015, Fantoni and Nunes were publicly accused of cheating by orienting a played card to show a missing high honour (Ace, King, Queen) in the led suit at the European Bridge Championship in 2014.

- On March 19, 2016, the FIGB banned the pair for three years.
- On July 18, 2016, the European Bridge League (EBL) banned each from play for five years and as a partnership for life.
- On July 26, 2016, the American Contract Bridge League (ACBL) expelled them from their league and stripped them of all related masterpoints, titles, ranks and privileges.

The players' appeal to the Court of Arbitration for Sport resulted in a judgment in their favor in January 2018.

Only the ACBL sanction remains in place; all others have been overturned or expired.

== Major tournament wins ==
=== Awards ===
- Mott-Smith Trophy (1) 2004

=== Wins ===
- Bermuda Bowl (1) 2005
- World Transnational Open Teams Championship (1) 2007
- World Open Pairs Championship (1) 2002
- World Olympiad Teams Championship (2) 2004, 2008
- European Teams Championship for Open Teams: 2004, 2006, 2012
- European Champions' Cup for Open Teams: 2003, 2004, 2005, 2007, 2008, 2009
- North American Bridge Championships (10)
  - Wernher Open Pairs (1) 2004
  - Blue Ribbon Pairs (1) 2006
  - Jacoby Open Swiss Teams (1) 2003
  - Mitchell Board-a-Match Teams (1) 2004
  - Reisinger (3) 2007, 2012, 2013
  - Roth Open Swiss Teams (1) 2005
  - Spingold (2) 2011, 2012

=== Runners-up ===
- Bermuda Bowl (3) 2003, 2009, 2013
- Cavendish Invitational Pairs (1) 2004
- Buffett Cup (2) 2010, 2012
- North American Bridge Championships (6)
  - Jacoby Open Swiss Teams (1) 2004
  - Vanderbilt (1) 2014
  - Reisinger (1) 2011
  - Spingold (3) 2006, 2010, 2014

== Bridge accomplishments ==
=== Awards ===
- Mott-Smith Trophy (1) 2004

=== Wins ===
- Bermuda Bowl (1) 2005
- World Transnational Open Teams Championship (1) 2007
- World Open Pairs Championship (1) 2002
- World Olympiad Teams Championship (2) 2004, 2008
- North American Bridge Championships (10)
  - Wernher Open Pairs (1) 2004
  - Blue Ribbon Pairs (1) 2006
  - Jacoby Open Swiss Teams (1) 2003
  - Mitchell Board-a-Match Teams (1) 2004
  - Reisinger (3) 2007, 2012, 2013
  - Roth Open Swiss Teams (1) 2005
  - Spingold (2) 2011, 2012

=== Runners-up ===
- Bermuda Bowl (3) 2003, 2009, 2013
- Cavendish Invitational Pairs (1) 2004
- Buffett Cup (2) 2010, 2012
- North American Bridge Championships (6)
  - Jacoby Open Swiss Teams (1) 2004
  - Vanderbilt (1) 2014
  - Reisinger (1) 2011
  - Spingold (3) 2006, 2010, 2014
