= Bidding box =

Device used in contract bridge

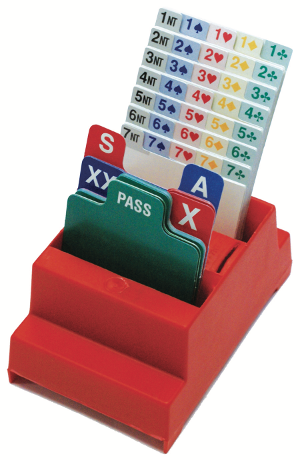
Bidding box for contract bridge

A bidding box is a device used for bidding in bridge, usually in duplicate bridge competitions. Made in various configurations and sizes, it is typically a plastic box with two holding slots, each containing a set of bidding cards: one with 35 cards with symbols of bids, and the other with cards for other calls (pass, double, etc.).

Invented in Sweden in 1962, they were first used at a World Bridge Championships game in 1970. Their usage eventually spread in Europe, United States and around the world, and today they present a virtually indispensable piece of equipment even for home-played games.

Use of bidding boxes has several advantages over oral bidding: it reduces noise in the room, prevents bidding being overheard at neighboring tables, allows easier review of the auction, and reduces the opportunity to pass unauthorized information to one's partner (intentionally or not) by the manner and intonation in which one makes one's bid.

== Construction ==
A bidding box is typically a plastic box with two slots, each containing a set of bidding cards. One slot contains 35 cards with symbols of bids (5 denominations—clubs (♣), diamonds (♦), hearts (♥), spades (♠), and notrump (NT)—in seven levels of bidding, numbered 1–7). The 35 bid cards are cut with tabs (as in a rolodex) and arranged in a staggered fashion so that any desired bid can be easily removed and placed on the table. On the backside of each bidding card are written up all possible results of the corresponding contract: if made exactly or with extra tricks; if doubled or redoubled; both non-vulnerable and vulnerable.

In the other slot are a supply of Pass cards (usually 6-10 cards, commonly colored green), a few Double (red, usually marked X) and Redouble (blue, XX) cards, an Alert card (light or dark blue), a Stop card (red), and, optionally, a Tournament Director card (orange). There is one bidding box for each of the four players, usually placed at the corner of the table to the player's right; in duplicate tournaments, boxes remain stationary on the tables. (Left-handed bidding cards overlap in the opposite direction from right-handed ones, and a left-handed player may take their own bidding box while moving through the room.)

There are two main types of bidding boxes: the more common ones are free-standing, placed in the corners on the tabletop. The hanging variant is smaller, with two holders closer together, and attached to the side of the table using C-clamps. The latter has the advantage that it does not occupy space on the table, but it can hamper the players' passage to and from their seats, so it gets damaged more easily. In some tournaments an L-shaped metal bracket is slid under the tabletop corners, leaving its other end standing up. This is inserted into a slit in a free-standing bidding box, which then functions like a clamped one. Another alternative is to use side tables, so that bidding boxes as well as refreshments and other belongings can be kept off the playing table. For storage purposes, the boxes usually have either a covered compartment at the bottom to store the bidding cards or a cover which is placed over the bidding cards attaching to the box base.

== History ==
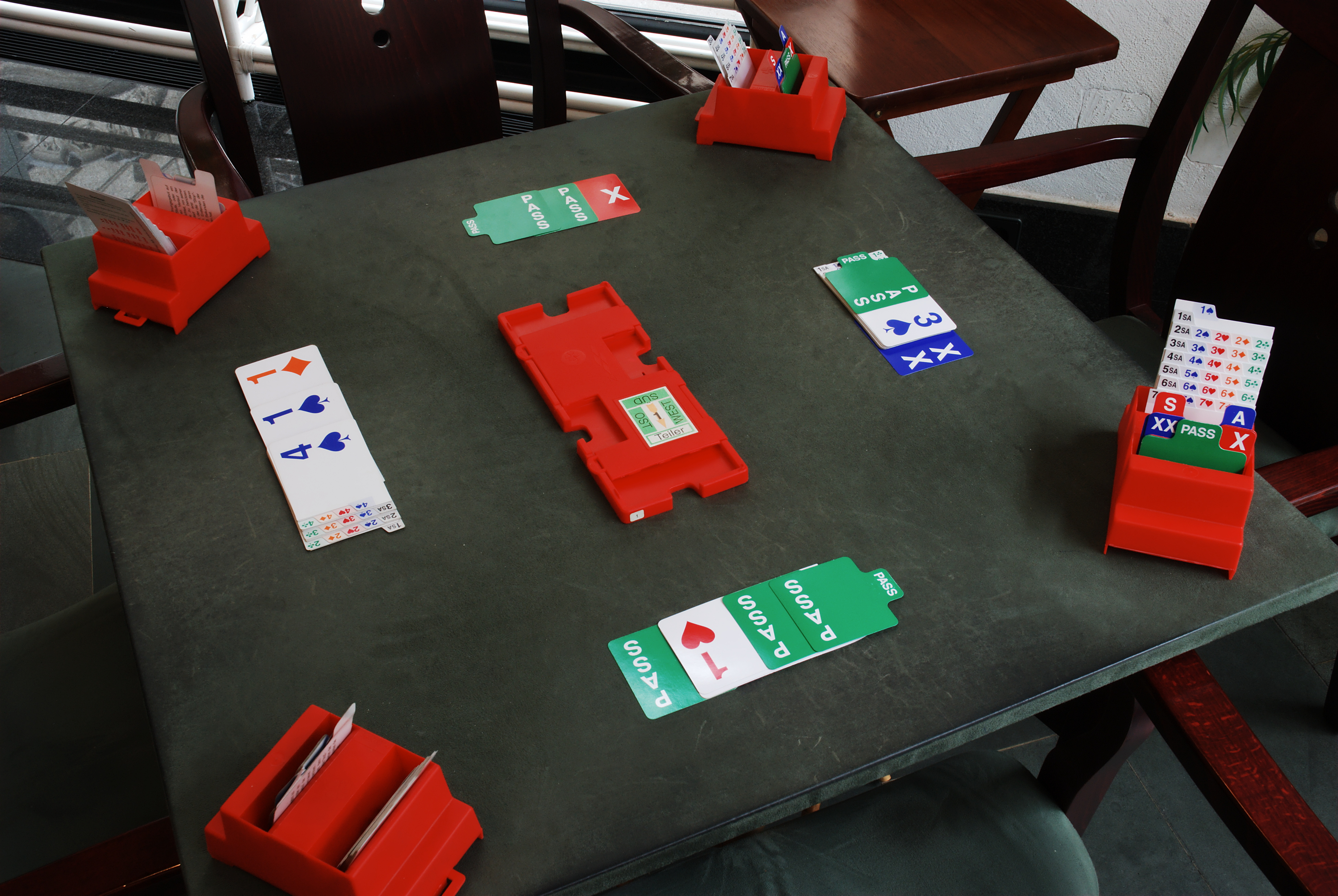
Completed auction using bidding cards

A bridge auction consists of a sequence of calls (a bid, pass, double, or redouble) made by each player in turn, until it is concluded by a sequence of three consecutive passes. With the transition from auction bridge to modern contract bridge, the bidding has become more complex, and conventional auctions often last through several rounds of bidding. Such long auctions are hard to memorize and review. In addition, oral bidding causes noise in tournament halls, and auctions can be easily overheard at the other tables.

Bidding boxes were invented in 1962 in Sweden by Gösta Nordenson and first used at a World Bridge Championships game in Stockholm in 1970. Eric Jannersten, a Swedish expert bridge player, author and founder of the largest European bridge equipment manufacturer, Jannersten Förlag AB bought the patent in 1970 being attributed by some as the inventor. However, the patent is disputed by the Swedish Bridge Federation.

They quickly became popular in Europe, and after some resistance were accepted in American bridge clubs. As of 2006, they are practically an indispensable part of the game, and even many rubber bridge players use them at home.

== Procedure ==
Use of bidding boxes has several advantages over oral bidding:

- It reduces noise in the room, which may contain a large number of tables.
- Bidding cannot be overheard at neighboring tables.
- Calls cannot be misheard; it assists players with hearing impairments.
- Because bidding cards remain on the table, players can review the auction as it progresses.
- Passing of unauthorized information by the manner of making a verbal call is eliminated.
- It is language-neutral, unlike verbal bidding which uses a natural language, e.g. English. The only non-language neutral elements are STOP, ALERT, and the way in which No Trumps are shown: usually either NT or SA (sans atout)

Each player selects a card from the bidding box at their turn to make a call, and places it in front of him. To make a bid, the entire remaining stack below and including the desired bid card should be pulled out, e.g. when bidding 1♥, the 1♦, and 1♣ cards are taken out at the same time in one bundle (unless they have already been used in that auction), but this bundle of cards is kept together so that the topmost one (the desired bid) covers the others. Pass, Double, and Redouble cards are used one by one as needed. The cards should be placed on the table with the symbols facing away from the bidder, giving the other players a better view of them. (Some designs are symmetrical, with two copies of the bid so that orientation is not an issue.)

Calls by the same player in successive rounds of the auction are placed on the table overlapping one another, so that the previous calls remain visible. For example, if the 1♥ bidder's next call is a bid of 3♥, they will take a packet of ten cards (1♠ through 3♥) and lay them down partially overlapping the packet of three cards of the 1♥ bid. With standard, "right-handed" boxes (see laterality below), the calls are placed left to right on the table as seen by the bidder.

When the auction is over, each player first returns to his bidding box any Pass, Double, and Redouble cards used. After that, all the bid cards from the table are simply swept up into a single stack and placed into the bidding box at the back; in this way, the box is returned to its original state and is ready for the following deal.

The additional (non-call) cards are used as follows:

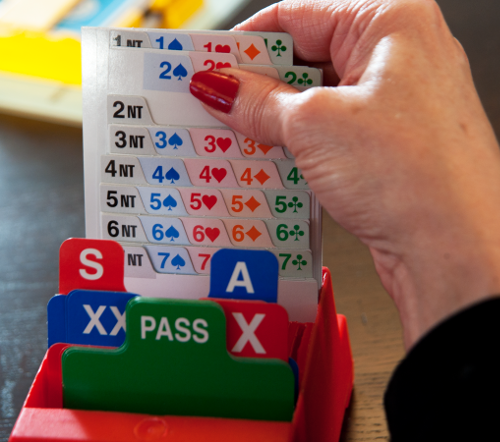
Using a bidding box

- The Alert card signals to the opponents that the partner's call has an artificial or unusual meaning (see bridge convention); the organizations sponsoring a tournament regulate which types of calls are to be alerted. As soon as a player makes the alertable call, his partner is supposed to pull out the alert card and display it briefly, ensuring that both opponents see it (with screens in use, players also alert their own calls, but only to their screen-mate). Instead of an alert card, some bidding boxes have an alert tab that protrudes vertically from a slit, and players alert by tapping it.
- Use of the Stop card is optional with most sponsoring organizations (the ACBL abandoned its use in January 2018), but if players use it, they must do so consistently for all skip (jump) bids so as not to remind their partner about the meaning of the bid. Prior to his own skip bid, a player displays the stop card and makes the bid, and then puts the stop card back into the box. The next player is then expected to wait about 10 seconds before making any call. Depending on the sponsoring organization, the player using the stop card may be responsible for leaving the card out for the 10 seconds so that the next player need not think about the timing. The rationale for the procedure is that jump bids, especially preempts, often pose a bidding problem for the opponents, and the left-hand opponent's fast or slow reaction after the bid can reveal information about his hand. In order to prevent such passing of unauthorized information, the skip-bid warning requires the next player to wait for a while with his bid, regardless whether they have a bidding decision problem or not.
- The Tournament Director card is held high in the hand when a player summons the director (referee) after an irregularity happens at the table, so that the director can spot it more easily.

The exact regulations for the use of bidding boxes vary according to the sponsoring authority. In tournaments sanctioned by the ACBL, for example:

1. Players must choose a call before touching any card in the box. A call is considered made when a bidding card has been taken out of the bidding box with intent.
2. A call may be changed without penalty (under the provisions of other bridge laws) only if a player has inadvertently taken out the wrong bidding card, and the player corrects, or attempts to correct, without pause for thought, and the player's partner has not made a call.
3. Use of the Stop card has been discontinued. No verbal or visual skip-bid warning should be used. Following a jump in the bidding, left-hand opponent is obligated to wait approximately 10 seconds (while giving the appearance of studying his hand and not in excess time to determine a choice of bids) before making a call.

== Accessibility considerations ==
Use of bidding boxes greatly improves the game for people with hearing impairment. For tournaments where bidding boxes are not available, sponsoring organizations will allow their use for the tables where they play. In the case of limited availability of the boxes, people with hearing problems will have precedence. Conversely, players with certain physical impairments (blindness, arthritis) may be unable to use bidding boxes and are exempted from their use.

=== Laterality ===
Most bidding boxes (more precisely, bidding cards) on the market are suited for right-handed people: the tabs of the bid cards grow up from right to left side of the stack, and the printed symbols are right side up when the card is held with the right hand at the tab. That makes it somewhat difficult for left-handed people, who naturally bid with their left hand: they would normally hold the box at the left side of the table, and the card symbols on standard boxes turn upside down unless rotated in an awkward manner. Also, the natural order of placing the cards would be from right to left. Some manufacturers offer bidding boxes for left-handed people, which are constructed (except for the placement of suit symbols on the tabs) and used as mirror images of right-handed boxes. Tournament organizers generally permit the players to carry their own left-handed bidding boxes.

=== Color perception ===
The card symbols are orange for the diamond pips and green for the club pips, whereas the spade and heart pips are the customary black ( or blue ) and red. No trumps are grey.

== See also ==
- Screen (bridge)
- Board (bridge)
