= Lotan Fisher =

Israeli bridge player

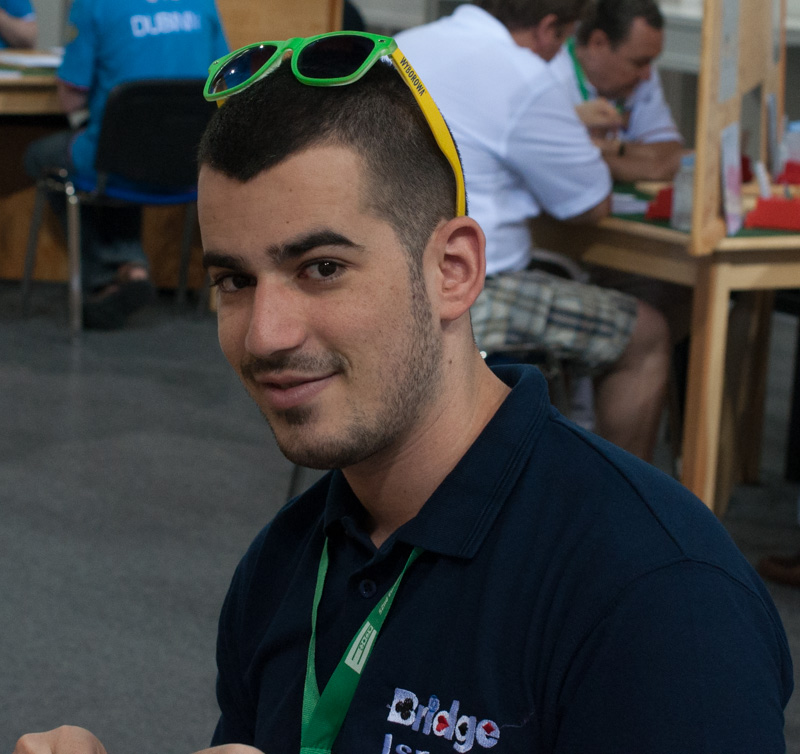
Lotan Fisher in 2014

Lotan Fisher (Hebrew: לוטן פישר) is an Israeli bridge player ranked as a World Life Master by the World Bridge Federation. He first appeared in international competition at the 18th European Youth Team Championships in Torquay in 2002 where his schools division team placed first. He competed primarily in pairs and individual junior events until 2008.

In 2008, Fisher began a partnership with Ron Schwartz which brought them progressive prominence in junior teams and junior pairs world competitions through to 2011, including several first-place finishes. In 2011, Fisher and Schwartz won the World Transnational Open Team Championship. Subsequently, they entered European based open team competitions with continued success as members of the Israeli team, including six top ten finishes. Fisher won several World and European medals together with different partners at the youth events from 2009 to 2013.

In May 2016, the European Bridge League imposed bans on both players for cheating. In July 2016, the American Contract Bridge League expelled both players for cheating and stripped their previously-won titles. In August 2016, the Israel Bridge Federation banned both players for cheating.

== Bridge accomplishments ==
=== Wins ===
- European Youth Team Championships - Schools Teams (1) 2002
- World Series Championships - Junior Teams (1) 2010
- European Youth Team Championships - Junior Teams (1) 2011
- World Team Championships - Transnational Teams (1) 2011
- Cavendish Invitational Pairs (1) 2012
- European Team Championships - Open Teams (1) 2014
- North American Bridge Championships (1)
  - Spingold (1) 2014; (note: title stripped by ACBL)

=== Runners-up ===
- World Bridge Games - Junior Pairs (1) 2008
- European Youth Team Championships - Youngsters Teams (1) 2009
- World Youth Team Championships - Junior Teams (1) 2012
