= Screen (bridge) =

Anti-cheating device in bridge

Placement of screen and accompanying equipment on a bridge table

A screen is a device used in some tournaments in duplicate bridge that visually separates partners at the table from each other, in order to reduce the exchange of unauthorized information and prevent some forms of cheating. It is a panel made of plywood, spanned canvas or similar material, which is placed vertically, diagonally across the playing table, with a small door in the center and a slit beneath it. The door is closed during the bidding stage, and the players place their calls using bidding cards on a movable tray, which slides under the door. After the opening lead, the door is opened, but its size allows the players only to see the hands and cards played from the opposite side of the screen, not their partner's face.

Screens are normally used on high-level competitions, such as World Bridge Olympiads, national teams championships and similar. They are always accompanied with bidding boxes and a tray for moving the bids across. Screens were first introduced in Bermuda Bowl competition in 1975, at the home venue in Bermuda; however, they didn't prevent the foot-tapping scandal involving two Italian players. Following that event, screens used in high-level events extend under the table to the floor forming a barrier running diagonally between two table legs.

== Rationale ==
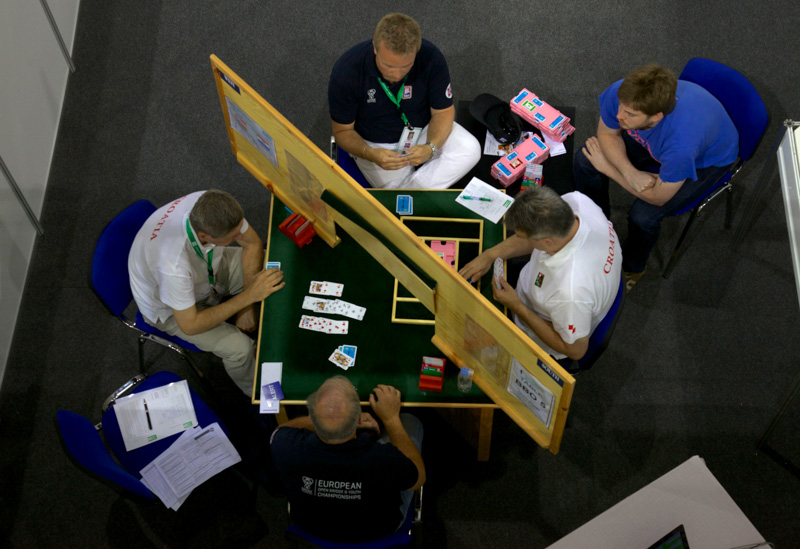
The screen separates partners view of each other

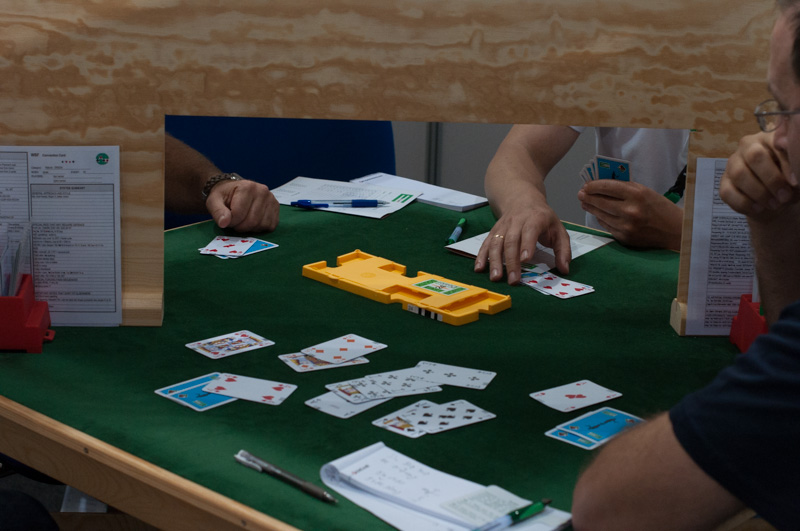
Screen door in the open position

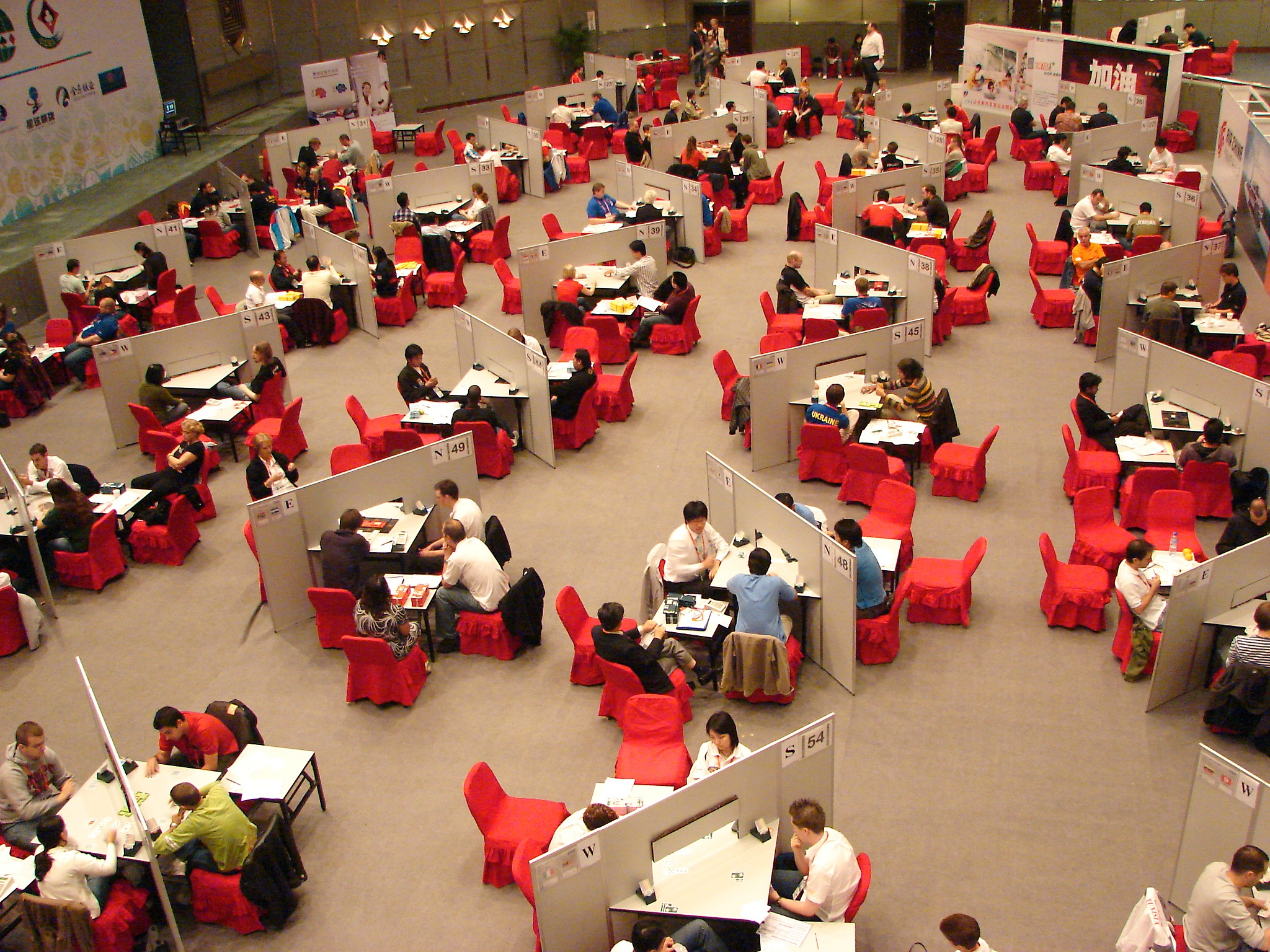
Full height screens in use at a tournament

Laws of Duplicate Contract Bridge state that "Players are authorized to base their calls and plays on information from legal calls and plays and from mannerisms of opponents. To base a call or play on other extraneous information may be an infraction of law.". Also, "After a player makes available to his partner extraneous information that may suggest a call or play, as by means of a remark, a question, a reply to a question, or by unmistakable hesitation, unwonted speed, special emphasis, tone, gesture, movement, mannerism or the like, the partner may not choose from among logical alternative actions one that could demonstrably have been suggested over another by the extraneous information." In other words, if a player receives such an unauthorized information from the partner (hesitation being the most frequent source), he may not act according to its (perceived) consequences (provided it is not an obvious thing to do, but "obvious" has rather high standard according to the laws).

The most frequent means for transmitting the unauthorized information are:

- Hesitation (break in tempo) during bidding and play. Players are supposed to make their bids and plays in a tempo as even as possible; an experienced player will often make a slight pause even when there is no problem at all, in order to maintain the same tempo if a problem occurs. However, when a player has a bidding or play problem, his hesitation often tells much about his holding. For example, a long contemplation over a double of opponents' contract indicates uncertainty whether the contract would be beaten, and "invites" the partner to bid on ("pull the double") without defensive values; a hesitation which card to play when the declarer plays towards dummy's king suggests possession of an ace, etc.
- Questions asked by the partner to the opponents. The players are entitled to know the meanings of opponents' bids, and they may ask them whenever it's their turn to bid or play. However, if a player has a habit to skip the question with a worthless hand and pass, and asks with some values (and passes if he doesn't like opponents' reply), his partner can draw conclusions about his holding.
- Questions asked by the opponents to the partner. If opponents ask the partner about the meaning of a bid or play, his answer may reveal a previous misunderstanding in the partnership. Also, the partner's alert of a bid he shouldn't have alerted, and vice versa, may indicate that someone has forgotten the agreement.
- Partner's gestures and facial expressions can be telling, even if inadvertent.

Outright cheating by transmitting information by gestures, finger play, pencil play and similar methods agreed in advance is strictly prohibited, and violators can be banned from duplicate play for several years or forever.

Screens are supposed to remove all issues except changes in tempo altogether: partners don't see each other, and since the screenmates are required to communicate only by writing, the partner cannot hear the (mis)explanation. Also, each player alerts both his own and his partner's bids and explains the meaning only to his screenmate, so even if a misunderstanding occurs, the partners will not become aware of it.

As for the hesitation, the players supposedly cannot tell who of the players from the opposite screen side hesitated (or whether the time was spent in writing the explanation), even if the tempo break occurs. In practice, it is not a panacea—for example, after two players produce a long constructive slam-seeking auction with opponents passing throughout, a break in tempo likely indicates partner's problem and not his screenmate's. However, players are encouraged to vary the tempo in which the tray is passed across (e.g. to withhold it for a while even without reason) in order to reduce the effects of hesitation.

In addition, the presence of the screen affects some of the rules of other irregularities. Namely, an illegal, inadmissible or inadvertent (the last subject to Director's appraisal) call may be replaced without penalty as long as the tray wasn't passed to the opposite side. Also, a call out of turn can be withdrawn without penalty if the tray did not change sides.

== Procedure ==
The screen is placed diagonally across the table in such fashion that North and East, South and West are screenmates. The board is placed in the middle of a movable tray. The screen is closed so that the bidding tray can just pass under it. It is North's responsibility to place the board on, and to remove the board from the bidding tray. It is West's responsibility to adjust the screen aperture; it is closed (and remains so during the whole of the auction period) so that the bidding tray can just pass under it. The players remove the cards from the board.

During bidding, calls are made with the cards from the bidding box. The player places the selected call in the bidding tray, which will be visible only on the player's side of the screen. After two players on the same side of the screen have made their calls, North or South (as the case may be) slides the bidding tray under the centre of the screen so as to be visible only to the players on the other side. They in turn make their calls in like manner and the bidding tray is slid back again. This procedure is continued until the auction is completed.

After a legal opening lead is faced, the screen aperture is opened sufficiently so that all players may see the dummy and the cards played to each trick.

A player may at any time during the auction, by written question only, ask for an explanation of an opponent's call; the screen-mate must respond in writing. Any questions during the play period must be made with the screen aperture closed; again, both question and answer must be in writing. The screen aperture is opened after the response has been made. Failure to observe the requirements for written questions and responses constitutes an offence subject to penalty. The Directors have been instructed to apply this condition strictly.

All communication through the screen as to meanings and explanations is expressly forbidden until the end of the play.

== Drawbacks ==
- One of major complaints of players to the screen procedure is that it reduces the social dimension of the game, reducing all communication to the card play. However, that is their very purpose.
- Screen procedure slows down the game. The standard tempo under screens is 8.5 minutes per hand, instead of standard 7.5 minutes.
- They are difficult to set up, and can be expensive to obtain for a large number of tables. They are usually reserved for team and trial events, and even on World Bridge Olympiads on pairs championships they are used only in final rounds.
