= Fulvio Fantoni =

Italian international bridge player

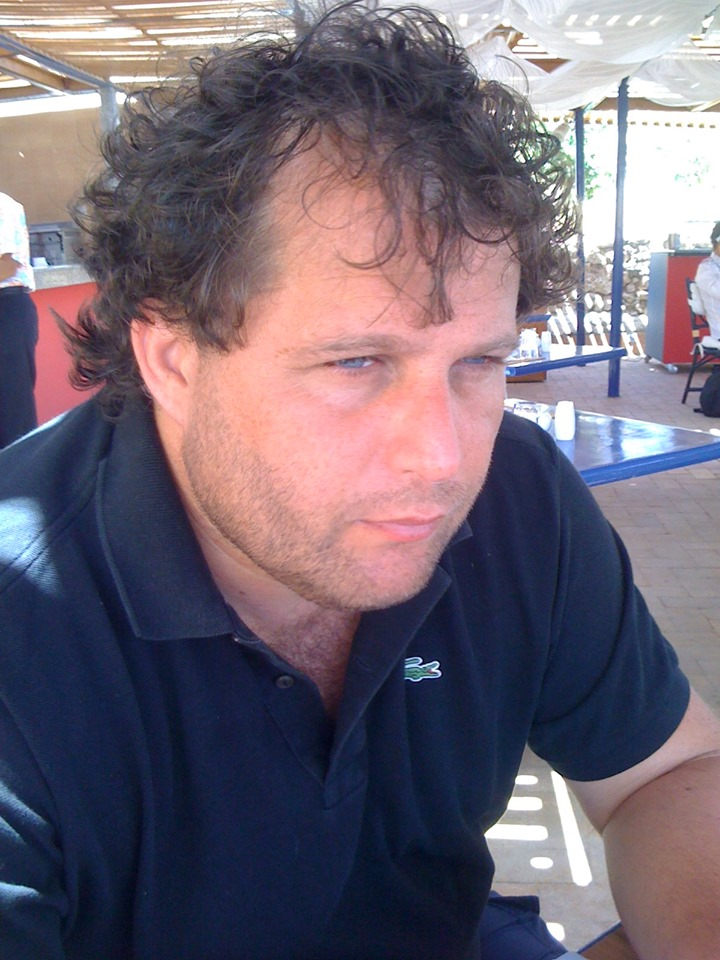

Fulvio Fantoni (born 9 November 1963) is an Italian international bridge player. He is a six-time world champion, a World Grand Master of the World Bridge Federation (WBF), and was the WBF's first-ranked player for much of his period of success. He is one of 10 players who have won the Triple Crown of Bridge.

Fantoni was born in Grosseto. November 1963, Fantoni says that he has lived "practically since I was born" in Ostia, in the coastal district of Rome. His regular partner for many years is Claudio Nunes, formerly the second-ranked World Grand Master. Nunes also lives in Ostia, and they see each other socially.

They play "Fantunes", for their surnames, an innovative bidding system characterised by natural but forcing one-level opening bids in all four suits. The pair was implicated in a cheating scandal in 2015, resulting in sanctions against them, only some of which were negated by appeals.

== Emigration to Monaco ==
Since 2011, Fantoni and Nunes have been full-time members of a team led and paid by the Swiss real-estate tycoon Pierre Zimmermann, under contract expiring in 2016. From 2012, all six members would be residents of Monaco and the team would represent Monaco internationally. The team finished third in the 2010 world championship, not yet full-time, and competed in the 2011 European Bridge League open championship (neither is a national teams event). In 2012, the team won the European Team Championship and got the second place in 2014. They were also runner up in the Bermuda Bowl 2013 in Bali.

== Cheating scandal ==
In September 2015, Fantoni and Nunes were publicly accused of cheating by orienting a played card to show a missing high honour (Ace, King, Queen) in the led suit at the European Bridge Championship in 2014. Three separate investigations were conducted, and they were found guilty.

- On 19 March 2016, the FIGB banned the pair for three years.
- On 18 July 2016, the European Bridge League (EBL) banned each from play for five years and as a partnership for life.
- On 26 July 2016, the American Contract Bridge League (ACBL) expelled them from their league and stripped them of all related masterpoints, titles, ranks and privileges.
- On 10 January 2018, the players' appeal to the Court of Arbitration for Sport resulted in a judgement in their favour. It found that:

"the majority of the Panel concludes that the exchange of information through the Code has not been proven to its comfortable satisfaction and rules that the appeal filed by the Players shall be upheld. Such a conclusion does not mean that the players are innocent of any wrongdoing; it only means that the EBL did not manage to prove to the comfortable satisfaction of the majority of the Panel that the Players committed an infraction of the EBL Rules."

- On 15 July 2018, the FIGB's Federal Appellate Court reversed its own decision and all sanctions were cancelled.

Only the ACBL sanction remains in place; all others have been overturned.

=== Subsequent controversy ===
In the 2021 European championships, Italy included Fantoni on its team. In protest, the remaining national teams refused to play against the Italians and subsequently forfeited their games. Several national bridge associations indicated support for the forfeitures.

== Major tournament wins ==
- Bermuda Bowl: 2005
- World Team Olympiad: 2004
- World Mind Sports Games: Open Teams 2008 — successor to the quadrennial Olympiad
- World Transnational Open Teams Championship: 2007
- World Open Pairs: 2002
- World Mixed Pairs: 2010
- European Teams Championships: 2004, 2006, 2012
- European Champions' Cup for Open Teams: 2003, 2004, 2005, 2007, 2008, 2009
- North American Bridge Championships (11)
  - Wernher Open Pairs (1) 2004
  - Blue Ribbon Pairs (1) 2006
  - Jacoby Open Swiss Teams (1) 2003
  - Mitchell Board-a-Match Teams (1) 2004
  - Chicago Mixed Board-a-Match (1) 2003
  - Reisinger (3) 2007, 2012, 2013
  - Roth Open Swiss Teams (1) 2005
  - Spingold (2) 2011, 2012

=== Runners-up ===
- Bermuda Bowl (3) 2003, 2009, 2013
- Cavendish Invitational Pairs (1) 2004
- Buffett Cup (2) 2010, 2012
- North American Bridge Championships (6)
  - Jacoby Open Swiss Teams (1) 2004
  - Vanderbilt (1) 2014
  - Reisinger (1) 2011
  - Spingold (3) 2006, 2010, 2014
