= Cheating in bridge =

Deliberate violation of bridge rules

Cheating in bridge refers to a deliberate violation of the rules of the game of bridge or other unethical behaviour that is intended to give an unfair advantage to a player or team. Cheating can occur in many forms and can take place before, during, or after a board or game.

Commonly cited methods of cheating include: conveying information to a partner by means of a pre-arranged illegal signal, viewing other players' cards in a board prior to their arrival at the table, or altering the records as to the results of a board; in certain games, it may include illicit shuffling to deal favourable cards to oneself or one's partner or marking cards.

== Definition ==
Unlike games such as chess which provide perfect information to the competitors, bridge is a game of imperfect information, and the exact contents of partner's and opponents' hands remain unknown until later in the play. Players are only entitled to act upon information conveyed by calls made and cards played, the visible contents of their own hand (and dummy's hand when exposed), and the opponents' demeanour. Unauthorized information (UI) (Law 16) is any information that a player obtains by means of:

- Partner's remarks, questions, mannerisms, hesitation and similar,
- Information from calls and plays which were legally withdrawn and/or substituted as a consequence of that side's infraction (the non-offending side may use this information),
- Overhearing remarks at other tables or seeing a wrong card.

Law 16 of the Laws of Duplicate Bridge states that Players are authorized to base their calls and plays on information from legal calls and plays and from mannerisms of opponents. To base a call or play on other extraneous information may be an infraction of law.

Bridge ethics require that the players take extra steps neither to convey nor to act on any unauthorized information. However, as the stakes are often high the temptation to cheat may prove irresistible. For example, players might pre-arrange code words, hesitations, or the way they play or hold their cards as a ploy to share details of their hand.

In the 1960s and 70s a notable innovation to reduce unauthorised communication (inadvertent or deliberate) was the use of bidding boxes that contain cards with the various calls players are entitled to make. When making a call, a player displays the appropriate card from their box instead of announcing the call orally. This allows players to indicate their calls without imparting any vocal inflection.

Law 73 states:

The gravest possible offence is for a partnership to exchange information through pre-arranged methods of communication other than those sanctioned in these laws.

— Law 73.B.2

and any deliberate act or behavior which conveys or obtains information other than by those means prescribed by the rules of the game constitutes cheating and is subject to sanctions by the governing bodies.

Apart from unlawful exchange of information, other forms of cheating include: viewing the opponents' cards in a board prior to their arrival at the table, altering the records as to the results of a board; in certain games, it may include illicit shuffling to deal favourable cards to oneself or one's partner, marking cards so as to make their denomination and or rank apparent only to the perpetrator, etc.

Certain errors or omissions by players which are inadvertent or purely procedural in nature, known as irregularities, are subject to correction by the tournament director in a manner prescribed by the Laws and the governing bodies; this may include a procedural penalty. Similarly, the tournament director may impose a procedural penalty for any one or any repeated violation of the code of conduct for ethical behaviour (rudeness, coffee housing, etc.).

=== Related terms ===
Alcatraz coup – An illegal deliberate maneuver designed to gain information from the opponents by failing to follow suit during play. Suppose the dummy and declarer hold A J x and K 10 9 respectively, needing all tricks. The Jack is called from dummy and declarer revokes, pitching a card of another suit. If the Left Hand Opponent produces the Queen, declarer immediately announces the "careless error" and instead plays the King, then finessing the opponent out of the Queen. But if the Left Hand Opponent plays low, the declarer again quickly corrects the revoke playing low, since the finesse is assured.

Chicago Convention – An illegal (tongue-in-cheek) convention used against one's opponents to claim a fouled hand. For instance while playing rubber bridge, one dishonest player picks up a hand without values and through prior secret agreement, recites a phrase such as, "How is your aunt in Chicago?" Partner may reply with a coded negative phrase such as, "She died last week." (meaning both players have bad hands). One conspirator will then say, "I only have 12 cards," to which the other conspirator will say, "and I have 14 cards!" The players then quickly throw their cards together on the table so their opponents' are unaware of the treachery. Also known as the 12-14 Convention.

Coffeehousing – A player may not perform extraneous or overt actions with the express purpose of frustrating or distracting a player. Some unscrupulous players use various emotional hooks, snapping cards, drumming fingers on table, inducing FUD: Fear-Uncertainty-Doubt, false flattery, sarcasm, embarrassment, greed, etc. Also known as "coffee housing", such misdeeds include making improper remarks, gestures, hesitations or the like, with the intention to confuse or mislead opponents (Law 73). After numerous deliberate opponent hesitations, Charles Goren advised a perpetrator, "Madam, that second hesitation certainly was an overbid!" Similarly, George Kaufman once retorted to his opponents, "Let's have a review of the bidding again, with all the inflections."

Irregularities – A breach of procedure, as described in the Laws and Proprieties, in bidding or play. If one is available, a director should be called to the table to make a ruling.

== Procedures ==
Bridge governing bodies have established procedures for the reporting of cheating allegation and their investigation.

=== World Bridge Federation anti-doping regulations ===
The WBF is recognised as an International Sports Federation by the International Olympic Committee (IOC) and has incorporated the IOC anti-doping regulations into its constitution and by-laws. The anti-doping regulations as published in the General Conditions of Contest are mandatory and refusal to take a drug test is subject to penalties. The regulations allow for participants to take prescription medication if prior notice is given to the laboratories.

== Notable incidents ==
=== Willard S. Karn, 1933: Accusation, withdrawal from bridge and vindication ===
Willard S. Karn (1898 – 28 April 1945) was ranked the number one American bridge player in 1932 by Shepard Barclay, a bridge writer for The New York Herald Tribune. He was a member of the famous Four Horsemen, a team formed a year earlier, headed by his playing partner and captain P. Hal Sims and with Oswald Jacoby and David Burnstine as the other team members. Karn also played for high stakes in New York rubber bridge clubs, including the Crockford Club which was owned by Ely Culbertson.

The growing popularity of contract bridge in the early 1930s gave rise to intense rivalry among many of the competing and self-anointed bridge authorities, formerly of Whist and Auction Bridge renown, including the emergence of Ely Culbertson as the brash interloper. The Four Horsemen dominated the US national tournament scene in 1931 and 1932 thereby providing considerable support and sway to Hal Sims' methods and public profile to Culbertson's chagrin.

Early in 1933, the Crockford Club (Ely Culbertson) hired card detective Mickey MacDougall to watch Karn for cheating. Posing as a waiter, MacDougall claimed that Karn would interleave high and low cards when gathering a trick before his turn to deal. When shuffling, Karn would use a false pull-through shuffle, crimp the deck before offering the cut and restore the deck with a hidden return cut before dealing favorable cards to his side in their rubber games. Karn denied the accusation but nevertheless resigned from the club and withdrew from competitive and social play.

In 1938, Karn brought a one million dollar defamation suit against Culbertson, six others and Crockford Inc. (the Crockford Club of New York), accusing them of spreading rumors and conspiring to remove him from the bridge world. In an eventual 1941 decision, the judge ruled against any monetary awards but found Karn has been wrongly accused and required the defendants to write apologies to Karn.

=== Incidents involving Karl Schneider, 1937–1957 ===
==== Playing with Hans Jellinek, 1937: Strong suspicion ====
In 1937, an international tournament in Budapest had eighteen teams entered; the American team, composed of Ely Culbertson, Josephine Culbertson, Charles Vogelhofer and Helen Sobel, met the Austrian team of Karl Schneider, Hans Jellinek, Walter Herbert and Carl von Bluhdorn in the finals. Austria won to become World Champions, but post-mortem analysis suggested that Schneider–Jellinek had exchanged illegal signals.

In his 1945 book, Why You Lose at Bridge S. J. Simon referenced the Austrian team playing the British team the following year and noted the "devastating leads" made by the Austrians, alluding to their cheating on the choice of opening leads.

Players who cheat are regularly more successful in opening leads than are their opponents. Sixty-five years later, the verdict of history must be that the Austrians should be disqualified and the Americans were entitled to reign as world champions.

— Alan Truscott

==== Request that Jean Besse refused, 1954 ====
The French were to play the Americans at the 1954 international contest but since it was a European-based championship, France was entitled to add two non-French players to their team; they chose Karl Schneider of Austria and Jean Besse of Switzerland.

Before the match, Schneider told Besse, "You know, we've got to help each other." Besse knew exactly what that meant and refused indignantly.

— Alan Truscott

==== Playing with Max Reithoffer, 1957: Accusation and end of partnership ====
In 1957, Austrian pair Karl Schneider and Max Reithoffer were found by the Swiss team member Jaime Ortiz-Patiño to hold their cards in peculiar positions. Ortiz-Patiño made notes of their activities and later deduced that the pair were exchanging information about the number of aces they held. Ortiz-Patiño recruited Alan Truscott as an additional witness to the code being used so as to corroborate his findings. Reithoffer was the President of the Austrian Federation hosting the tournament and Truscott much later recounted that in order to avoid embarrassment, the accusation was discreetly presented without a formal inquiry and no public finding of guilt; the pair agreed never to play again, except for a minor event in London for which they were already entered.

Victor Mollo alluded to the 1957 incident in his 1958 book, Bridge Psychology, but without acknowledging that there was no public finding of guilt. He and his publisher were sued by Schneider and Reithoffer but settled out-of-court. While no official reasons were disclosed, it was later speculated by Truscott that although evidential testimony by him was available, the publisher and insurance company "wanted a cheap way out".

=== Adam Meredith, 1950s: Refusal to play ===
Adam Meredith was a British bridge professional known for his honesty. He played rubber bridge for stakes and tournament bridge as a member of the British international team. In his 1968 book The Bridge Immortals, Victor Mollo wrote:

Some years ago, Adam Meredith created a precedent by declining to play for Britain at an international tournament, because he was convinced that two of the participants from the Continent were cheats. Other players, British and Continental, thought as he did and applauded him for his stand, but all played—except Meredith.

— Victor Mollo

=== Franck Bodier and Pierre Figeac, 1954: Accusation and withdrawal from bridge ===
In the 1950s, Frenchmen Franck Bodier and Pierre Figeac were winning virtually every major competition they entered. Under observation at the 1954 European Championships in Montreux, Switzerland and after too perfect a performance in making opening leads, they were summoned before a tournament committee. They resigned from the French Federation and "disappeared from the game".

=== Accusation by Tobias Stone, 1958 ===
The 1958 Bermuda Bowl was held in Como, Italy. The Italian team was leading and, as was usual at the time, were holding their hands over their heads so that kibitzers could see them and follow the action. However, Tobias Stone claimed that the Italians were holding their hands aloft only when they were strong but lower when weak. The officials asked the Italians, who felt insulted by the insinuation, to keep their hands low at all times.

Back in the US after having lost by a large margin, Stone continued to accuse the Italians of cheating and the Italians threatened a lawsuit. The American Contract Bridge League (ACBL) censured Stone and barred him from international play for one year owing to his "conduct unbecoming a representative of the American Contract Bridge League." Stone sued the ACBL for $25,000 in damages for defamation and asked the court to set aside the one-year ban. A petition by one hundred prominent players moved the ACBL to drop the ban and Stone dropped the lawsuit.

Analysis of the boards played at the match was undertaken by Charles Goren and also by Edgar Kaplan together with Alfred Sheinwold. Kaplan and Sheinwold concluded that it was impossible to prove either side of the issue. Goren was unconvinced that the Italians cheated and felt that the Americans did not do well because they were distracted by the thoughts of being cheated; Goren publicly apologised to the Italians.

=== Accusation against Claude Delmouly and Gerard Bourchtoff, 1960 ===
Claude Delmouly and Gerard Bourchtoff were members of the French national team that won the World Team Olympiad in Turin, Italy in 1960. Months later they were accused by Simone Albarran, widow of Pierre Albarran, of using signals at another event prior to Turin to show hand strength. Specifically, it was alleged that they used an illegal signal known as ‘l’ascenseur’ in French (‘the lift’ in British English and ‘the elevator’ in North American English) in which the user holds his cards opposite his chest with maximum values, opposite his belt with minimum values and in between when in between.

A committee of the French Federation found the trail too cold to reach any conclusion but suspended both the accused and the accuser for failing to report the incident in a timely manner. The suspension was appealed by Mme Albarran and she won a nominal one sou in damages.

=== Problem at the 1963 Bermuda Bowl ===
The 1963 Bermuda Bowl was held in St. Vincent, Italy with the Americans and Italians in the finals. An anonymous letter written in Italian was delivered to the American coach John Gerber. He secured a translator to read it aloud but asked the translator to stop after the first paragraph, to deliver the letter to Italian captain Carl'Alberto Perroux, and to explain that Gerber had heard only the first paragraph. The writer had accused the Blue Team of cheating by signaling with the positioning of their cigarettes. After reading the letter to his team, Perroux suggested that the match be played with screens running across the tables (12 years before modern screens were introduced), but Gerber would have none of it. The goodwill engendered by this exchange inspired Perroux and his team to present their championship trophies to Gerber and the American team in what was described as the greatest act of sportsmanship in bridge history.

The winning Italian team members were Massimo D'Alelio, Giorgio Belladonna, Eugenio Chiaradia, Pietro Forquet, Benito Garozzo, Camillo Pabis Ticci.

The string of Blue Team victories was also followed by some cheating allegations—mainly against "lesser" team members and none against Belladonna–Avarelli, Garozzo–Forquet, or Garozzo–Belladonna.

=== Accusations against Terence Reese and Boris Schapiro, 1949-1965 ===
Terrence Reese and Boris Schapiro were among the world's best partnerships between 1948 and 1965.

==== Early incidents ====
Having been on the team in 1948 when Britain won the European Teams title, Reese and Schapiro were invited in late 1949 to play on the next British team but were disinvited four months later without explanation.

According to Alan Truscott, during the trials for the 1950 British team, Reese and Schapiro were in the lead when Maurice Harrison-Gray withdrew, asking for an inquiry into Reese and Schapiro's performance; his request was refused and he was reprimanded and barred for one year from international play. However, Gray led the British team to victory in the 1950 European Championship, and captained it in the 1950 Bermuda Bowl. Other sources suggest that Gray withdrew from international play because of disagreements with the British Bridge League over the running of the game.

Rumors about the British pair resulted in Edgar Kaplan being designated to keep an eye on Reese and Schapiro during the 1955 Bermuda Bowl in New York; Kaplan found nothing.

At the 1960 championship held in Turin, Eric Murray told Reese "your opponents are quite convinced they were being cheated". Don Oakie of the USA also identified suspicious mannerisms but was asked to keep quiet to avoid embarrassment. Harold Franklin was asked to pass the information to the British Bridge League; he did not do this but did tell Reese that there were suspicions. Truscott wrote that Reese and Schapiro did not participate on British teams again until 1964 in New York when they lost a semi-final to Italy, but in fact they were on the team which won the European Championships in Baden-Baden in 1963.

==== Bermuda Bowl, 1965 ====
At the Buenos Aires Bermuda Bowl, Reese and Schapiro were accused of signaling information about their heart holdings and were found guilty by the World Bridge Federation appointed committee. The WBF did not announce a penalty, deferring to the British Bridge League. Instead, the BBL established a formal inquiry into the matter and ultimately found that the case against Reese and Schapiro was not proven to the required standard of proof.

=== Henry Itkin and Kenny Rhodes, 1970: Accusation and confession ===
When confronted, Henry Itkin and Kenny Rhodes confessed to illegally exchanging information about suit holdings at a Washington sectional. They were expelled from the ACBL, with an opportunity to apply for readmission available after five years.

=== Conviction of Manoppo brothers, 1974 ===
Suspicions about Indonesian brothers M. F. Manoppo and F. E. Manoppo were raised by the Australians after the brothers won three consecutive Far East Championships. An investigation of their "astonishing" performance and "incredible" leads in 600 deals by a WBF committee found 75 cases of suspect leads. The brothers were barred from playing together for life and were suspended for a "long period".

=== Incidents involving Facchini–Zucchelli 1974 and 1975 ===
==== Monte Carlo 1974 ====
The final standings of Monte Carlo contest in June 1974 were reported in Le Bridgeur as follows:

1. Facchini–Zuchelli (Italy), 253.45%
2. Cohen–Katz (USA), 251.94%
3. Belladonna–Garozzo (Italy), 248.13%
4. Teverini–Vives (France), 241.02%
5. Mr et Me Gandini (Italy), 239.28%
6. Russel–Sontag (USA), 239.33%
7. Chagas–Assumpçao (Brasil), 239.12%

In his 1977 book The Bridge Bum Alan Sontag writes as follows:

The Garozzo–Belladonna partnership was rumored, through 1973, never to have lost a pairs event (when they were finally defeated in Monte Carlo in 1974 there was evidence that the victors were cheating)

— Alan Sontag

==== Bermuda Bowl 1975 ====
At the 1975 Bermuda Bowl, Facchini and Zucchelli were accused of communicating by means of foot tapping under the table. A committee was unable to find specific correlation between the foot movements observed and the bidding or play of the hands, a factor usually considered essential to conclusive proof of cheating.

The event was subsequently won by the Italian team of Giorgio Belladonna, Benito Bianchi, Pietro Forquet, Benito Garozzo, Dano De Falco, Arturo Franco.

In the aftermath of their mischief, boards now run beneath the table.

An editorial by Eric Milnes in Bridge Magazine complimented the Italian team on their success in the 1975 Bermuda Bowl, but continued:

What a pity it is that these happenings should have been soured by yet another accusation of cheating, this time against the Italian pair Facchini and Zucchelli. Bidding screens were of course being used, so the accusation now was that the pair were communicating by playing "footsy-footsy" under the table. The matter was reported to the World Bridge Federation authorities, who, in an almost unanimous vote, threw out the accusation. They rather spoilt the effect of this, however, by reprimanding the two Italians for "improper conduct with respect to actions of Mr. Zucchini moving his feet unnaturally and touching his partner's feet during the auction and before the opening lead". Well, now, what does this mean? Either the Italians cheated or they didn't. Very well, then. For what are they being reprimanded?

Two points arise. The first is a well-known fact: that eye-witnesses, as every police force in the world will tell you, are unreliable, and when they are told in advance what to look for they are doubly unreliable. The second point is that players have mannerisms. They are not automatons. One of the best and most respected players in America taps his foot in moments of stress. Others cross and uncross their legs. Others again fiddle with their pencils. The Italian – and this is a matter of record; he was under observation for it in England last year – shuffles his feet about. Is this a cause for reprimand?

These events might perhaps have not assumed so much importance had it not been for the prologue to the Championship. The villain of the piece is one Alfred (Freddie) Sheinwold, a man hitherto regarded with respect and indeed affection everywhere, who wrote articles in the Californian publication 'Popular Bridge' in which he attacked the ethics and behaviour of the Italians in a series of astonishing innuendos which have proved to be without foundation. Then – wait for it – the Americans actually selected this man as non-playing captain of the American team. The Italians were outraged. The European Bridge Federation requested the Americans to reconsider. The Americans refused. The wind was sown, but fortunately the whirlwind turned out to be no more than a tiny tornado, through which the Italian ship was able to sail not, perhaps, without hurt, but with its flag still flying.

It is time that all this nonsense was stopped, for, unless it is, there is bound to be a schism sooner or later in the World Bridge Federation.

— Eric Miles, Bridge Magazine

=== Accusation by Leandro Burgay, 1976 ===
Also known as "the Burgay tapes" and "the Burgay-Bianchi affair"

In the February prior to the May 1976 Bermuda Bowl in Monte Carlo, Leandro Burgay, a leading Italian expert in the '70s, claimed that he had had a telephone conversation with Benito Bianchi, Pietro Forquet's partner in both the 1973 and 1974 Italian World Championship victories, during which Bianchi had discussed illegal signaling methods, using placement of cigarettes in the ashtray or in the mouth, which he had used with Forquet and that Giorgio Belladonna had used with Renato Mondolfo.

The next day, Burgay gave a tape of the conversation to Luigi Firpo, president of the Federazione Italiana Gioco Bridge (FIGB) - the Italian Bridge Federation. The tape contained unusual sounds - “odd clicks as if it had been spliced” and after listening to it, Bianchi acknowledged that while it was he speaking, the tape had been doctored. Burgay then produced a second tape, this time without the unusual sounds. He had deliberately added the sounds to a copy of the tape to get Bianchi's admission that the conversation had taken place. Bianchi claimed that the discussion only concerned how a cheating method would be possible, not that it had actually occurred.

The FIGB suspended Burgay for six years and Bianchi for six months. After Burgay threatened civil action, his suspension was reduced to eighteen months and Bianchi's suspension was rescinded. Until that point, the matter had been dealt with internally by the FIGB, but it became a public scandal days before the start of the 1976 Bermuda Bowl when the incident hit the newspapers.

Even though Burgay was not a member of the current Italian team, Forquet was and the World Bridge Federation decided it was necessary to take some action but there was little they could do before the tournament and simply requested that the FIGB conduct an investigation. The FIGB claimed to have already conducted an investigation, but the WBF wanted a written report. A year later at the 1977 Bermuda Bowl in Manila, there was no evidence of the promised FIGB investigation and the WBF considered suspending the FIGB from membership in the world organization, but instead gave the FIGB another year to address the matter.

Before the 1978 Olympiad in New Orleans, a new slate of officials was elected by the FIGB who were able to satisfy the WBF that the required investigation had been performed. The threat of suspension was lifted. Alan Truscott later characterized the FIGB actions as "defensive stonewalling by his [Burgay's] national organization".

The first entry on the matter in The Official Encyclopedia of Bridge was made under CHEATING ACCUSATIONS in its fourth edition (1984) and remained throughout to the seventh and latest edition (2011) stating that "The case came to the attention of the WBF, but nothing ever came of it because it was never proved that the tapes were authentic."

=== Richard Katz and Larry T. Cohen, 1977: Accusation, legal proceedings, end of partnership ===
Also known as 'The Houston Affair'

During the January 1977 North American Team Trials, an allegation of improper communication between partners Richard H. Katz and Larry T. Cohen, (Note: This is not Larry Cohen who authored the Law of Total Tricks.) two members of the John Gerber team, was made. Tournament officials investigated and resulted in ACBL President Louis Gurvich announcing that Katz and Cohen had resigned from their team and from the ACBL. Reduced to three members, the Gerber team was forced to forfeit.

When newspaper articles quoted "reliable sources" as saying that the pair had been guilty of serious infractions against the proprieties of bridge, Katz and Cohen filed a $44 million lawsuit alleging defamation of character, interference with business interests, false accusations of cheating, coerced withdrawal from the trials and forced resignation from the ACBL. They demanded that they be reinstated as ACBL members and that the trials resume. Katz and Cohen later filed another suit accusing the ACBL of violation of federal antitrust actions.

An out-of-court settlement was reached on 23 February 1982 where it was agreed as follows:

1. Katz and Cohen would be readmitted to the ACBL except that they would not play as a partnership.
2. Katz and Cohen could make application to play together again on or after 1 March 1984.
3. Commercial Union Assurance Company, insurer of the ACBL, would pay for costs and attorneys' fees incurred with respect to the lawsuit: Katz and Cohen to receive $75,000.
4. The lawsuit was dismissed with mutual release of all claims.

The ACBL defended the decision in its monthly magazine with the following statement:

This case was unique in that Katz–Cohen resigned from membership in the ACBL rather than face charges of improper communication and certain ejection from the ACBL should these charges be sustained. No matter how one may feel as to whether there was or was not improper communication, the fact remains that because of their resignations no evidentiary presentation of this charge was ever made.

Those who were of the opinion that Katz and Cohen were guilty of exchanging information improperly have retained that opinion. I doubt that a resolution by a trial would have changed it, especially since that question would not have been the most relevant issue in the trial. Those who were on the other side were also vehement on behalf of Katz and Cohen – it is equally likely that their opinion would not have been changed by a trial.

This matter has been before the ACBL Board of Directors for five years. Management has been continually required to furnish information to all lawyers. Katz and Cohen, by their resignations, have not been members of the ACBL nor have they played in ACBL-sanctioned events for five years. Estimates were that the trial would take five to eight weeks. A judge in Los Angeles County, therefore, made a most strenuous effort to dispose of this case without a trial.

The basic position of the ACBL through all negotiations was that Katz and Cohen should not play together as a pair. Katz and Cohen would not accept this restriction. When there was movement by Katz and Cohen toward acceptance of restriction, this basic concession made it possible to find a ground whereby they could be considered for readmission. On Feb. 23, 1982, Katz and Cohen were re-admitted, but they agreed not to play together. The Katz-Cohen lawsuit alleged a number of causes of action, all of which were terminated by this settlement. Payment of the plaintiffs’ legal fees was made by the insurance company alone, a result of negotiations between the insurance company and the plaintiffs. No payments to the plaintiffs were made by the ACBL. (The amount of remuneration to the ACBL for legal fees is in litigation at this writing.)

Is this settlement a precedent-setting case for any future lawsuit? Absolutely not! Each case will be dealt with individually.

— James Zimmerman, ACBL President, Bridge Bulletin, April 1982

=== Steve Sion and Alan Cokin, 1979: Accusation and confession, end of partnership ===
Steve Sion and Alan Cokin had come under suspicion because of unusual bids and leads and were under observation at the 1979 spring NABC in Norfolk and at the Grand National Finals in Atlanta the same summer. It was concluded that they were using improper pre-arranged communication, a contravention of Law 73.b.2, by signaling their distribution, especially about short suits, by the way they placed their pencils on the table after writing down the contract. Both confessed and the ACBL barred the pair from ACBL play for five years and vacated their share of the team win in the Mitchell Board-a-Match Teams at Norfolk.

After five years, both players applied for and were granted reinstatement, with certain stipulations, the most important of which was that they would not be allowed to play as a partnership. Since then, Cokin devoted himself to removing the blemish on his record by promoting bridge youth programs while Sion became involved in another serious proprieties case in 1997 and was again expelled this time for life.

It remains a point of contention as to whether or not the title won by the remaining Sternberg team members at Norfolk should be vacated by the ACBL. Despite a timely request by the second-place finishers (the Hann team) for a Committee, none was held. The Bridge World July 1984 editorial raised the matter again in connection with an issue of Sion–Cokin being on a team with potential to represent the US in an upcoming Bermuda Bowl.

=== Suspension of Moses Ma et al., 1984 ===
Five players, all students from the area of Cambridge, Massachusetts, and active in the bridge club at the Massachusetts Institute of Technology were suspended by the ACBL for cheating by passing illegal signals at the July 1984 NABC in Washington, DC. Captain Moses Ma was from Cambridge, as was Rajan Batta and Fadi Farah; other members were Philips Santosa of Boston and Bhaskaram Jayant Ishwar of Somerville, Massachusetts.

=== Soren Godtfredsen and Sorin Lupan, 1990: Strong suspicion ===
The 88-per cent instant matchpoint scoring by Soren Godtfredsen and Sorin Lupan was so remarkable, far exceeding any previous score in this or any other comparable event, that it was deemed necessary to verify it before confirming it in the official standings.

=== Tony Haworth, 1999: Conviction and confession ===
In 1999, Tony Haworth, a Welsh international player, was found to have introduced prepared decks of cards into a duplicate bridge competition. There was no suggestion that anyone else had been involved in or knew of it.

On 23 November 1999, the Welsh Bridge Union (WBU) released a statement reporting findings made by the WBU Laws & Ethics Committee on 12 November 1999:

1. "That on four separate occasions during the 1999 Welsh Foursomes, Mr A Haworth substituted for the cards provided by the organisers a pack of cards prepared by himself and dealt from such prepared pack, contrary to Law 6 of the Laws of Duplicate Contract Bridge; and that on each occasion the resulting deal was played in the match."
2. "That such conduct by Mr Haworth amounted to unfair play, and as such constituted an offence under clause VIIIB(1)(a) of the Constitution of the Welsh Bridge Union."
3. "That Mr Haworth had admitted the offence, and in answer to questioning had indicated that nobody else had had knowledge of his actions."

The Committee imposed a suspension from membership of the WBU for ten years starting 23 November 1999. They also made provision for publication of their findings and for notification of relevant bridge organisations.

One of the hands introduced into the Welsh Foursomes on 11 September 1999 proved to be identical to a hand played by Haworth in the Welsh Cup Final on 25 May 1998. The bidding and play too were identical on the two occasions.

Since expiry of the suspension, Haworth has resumed involvement in duplicate bridge.

=== John Blubaugh, 2000: Suspension, denial, and legal proceedings ===
The American Contract Bridge League made a brief announcement about a conduct matter during the recent Spring Nationals in Kansas City, Mo. It said that John Blubaugh, a bridge teacher and professional player from Bowling Green, Ind., had been suspended for 18 months and placed on probation for five years after that.

— Truscott, Alan

The league said it had evidence that Blubaugh had given his partner a specific card when he was the dealer at several tournaments. League officials had taken videotapes that were used by the Ethical Oversight Committee and the league's board in deciding the matter. He denied the charges and said that his shuffling appeared clumsy because of an accident years ago that damaged the nerves in the hand.

He sued the league for $3 million in damages, claiming that the suspension was wrongful and had effectively ended a career in which he hired himself to weaker players for tournament play. The Court granted summary judgment against him; this was upheld by the Circuit Court of Appeals, and Blubaugh was not granted certiorari by the US Supreme Court.

=== Disa Eythorsdottir, 2002: Medal stripped due to alleged IOC drug violation ===
Eythorsdottir was stripped of a silver medal at the 2002 world championships in Montreal for refusing to take a drug test covering substances banned by the IOC.

Eythorsdottir claims she was on a prescription diet drug connected with a back condition. She had asked the authorities if the drug was banned. She did not have a certificate to cover the prescription.

=== Andrea Buratti and Massimo Lanzarotti, 2005: Accusation, disqualification, and expulsion ===
In 2005, Italian professional players Andrea Buratti and Massimo Lanzarotti were playing the Israeli team in the Swiss-system qualifying section of the European Transnational Teams Championship in Tenerife and their team needed a convincing win into the knockouts. Early in the match, Ilan Bareket, 35, of the Israeli team, summoned an official and claimed that Lanzarotti as dummy had looked at Bareket's hand and had secretly conveyed information about the cards to Buratti with a finger signal. The incident is also known as "The Tenerife Affair".

The crucial piece of information — that Bareket had three of the remaining four trumps — was allegedly given by Lanzarotti placing three fingers of his right hand over his left wrist as he rested his arms on the table. Buratti subsequently played "against the odds" — a risky course of action without knowing opponents' hands — and won, helping to provide his team with a 25-2 victory.

Before an appeals committee, Lanzarotti denied looking into Bareket's hand and said the sight in his left eye was so poor that he would not have been able to distinguish the red honors anyway. Buratti stated that the Israelis had asked a lot of questions, which made declarer think that the trumps were breaking badly. He continued that the first two boards had been bad and they needed a big victory, so he had intentionally played against the percentage. The appeals committee found declarer's explanations unconvincing and that his line of play had been influenced by dummy's behaviour. The committee ruled that Buratti and Lanzarotti were disqualified from the team event, and the match score was adjusted to 18-0 victory points in favor of the Israeli team.

In November 2005, Buratti and Lanzarotti were expelled by the American Contract Bridge League (ACBL). In March 2011, the two applied to the ACBL for readmission but were denied.

=== Ken Gee, 2007: Accusation, denial, suspension and probation ===
Canadian Ken Gee, a professional playing with clients and other professionals, was suspended for repeatedly looking at the opponents' hands in boards yet to be played before the opponents arrived at the table. Testimony of such conduct spanned the period from about August 2006 through to the Fall NABC in San Francisco November 2007.

In July 2008, ACBL's Ethical Oversight Committee gave Gee:

- a 13-month suspension to the end of December 2009, allowing for some 'time served' after his removal from the Fall NABC, 27 November 2007.
- five years probation
- loss of all masterpoints received from 31 July 2007 to 31 December 2007

Under automatic appeal in November 2008, the Appeals and Charges Committee:

- increased the suspension period to 18 months to the end of May 2009 notwithstanding that the ACBL disciplinary guidelines recommend a suspension period of two years up to including expulsion for actively seeking information about a board before it is played.
- lifetime probation
- loss of all masterpoints, titles and awards received from 31 July 2006 to December 2007

Gee claimed he suffered from a medical condition related to distress over recent deaths of two family members.

=== Geir Helgemo, Terje Aa, and others, 2008: Reporting a false score, suspension ===
Geir Helgemo's team and his opponent's team reported a false score (claiming a match was played when it was not to the benefit of both teams) in a match in Norway. All players involved were suspended by the Norwegian Bridge Federation. Three of the players involved, Terje Aa (ACBL # 9027661), Geir Helgemo (ACBL # 4036808) and Jørgen Molberg (ACBL # 8896631) were members of the American Contract Bridge League (ACBL) and were suspended by the ACBL.

=== Michael Elinescu and Entscho Wladow, 2013: Accusation, conviction, legal proceedings ===
The 7th d'Orsi Senior Bowl, named for WBF Past President Ernesto d'Orsi, was held in Bali, Indonesia, 16–29 September 2013.

In the early rounds, non-playing captain Donna Compton anticipated that her USA team might end up playing against the Germans and was scouting their playing sessions in order to better coach her team about them. Intrigued by reports that the Germans were renowned for their eccentric bidding and their ability to find unique winning opening leads, Compton asked that the Germans be monitored; she was denied for lack of proof that anything was amiss. Team member Eddie Wold played against the Germans in the Finals and determined that they coughed at the beginning of the auction and at the beginning of play. He made a record of the coughing timing and frequency, suspecting some kind of coded information was being exchanged and wrote down the times and frequency of the coughs and passed the information to Donna Compton.

Presented with Wold's record, officials wanted more information. Team USA were to play the Germans. Overnight, Compton analysed the cough record against the hands that had been played and broke the code. At the same time, and without wanting to know Compton's keys to the coughing code, the officials had reconsidered and advised her that they would place a monitor with the Germans and video tape them but on condition that the decision to do so be withheld from Compton's team. After the penultimate set, the monitor concluded that the Germans were cheating by means of their cough signals but due process obliged that they would continue to play so that more hands would solidify the proof. The Germans 'won' and Compton was assured that the matter would be resolved after the tournament close.

Compton submitted a Formal Letter Requesting Inquiry and Formal Complaint with the Exhibits to the WBF on 4 October 2013. Meanwhile, the WBF wanted more evidence and knew the Doctors would be playing in the Cavendish a couple of weeks after the Championships. They asked officials to track their coughs and compare them with the hand records. 19 out of 19 hands recorded matched the coughing code providing corroborating evidence from a separate tournament.

Ultimately a formal committee hearing in Dallas in January 2014 found Elinescu and Wladow guilty of reprehensible conduct. The Disciplinary Commission imposed the following sanctions upon them:

1. Michael Elinescu and Entscho Wladow shall be banned from playing together in any WBF organised championship or competition for life;
2. Michael Elinescu and Entscho Wladow shall be each individually banned from playing in a WBF organised championship or competition for a period of 10 years;

Under appeal, a decision on 16 July 2014 of the WBF Appeal Tribunal ruled as follows:

1. Germany results to be disqualified from the 2013 d'Orsi Seniors Trophy;
2. Germany is stripped from any placement in the 2013 d'Orsi Seniors Trophy;
3. The Gold Medals are revoked from Germany and all the members of the German Seniors Team and have to be returned to the WBF together with the d'Orsi Trophy and its Replicas;
4. The title of World Champion is revoked from Germany and all the members of the German Seniors Team;
5. The WBF Master Points awarded to any member of the German Seniors Team are removed,
6. The final ranking of the 2013 d'Orsi Seniors Trophy is modified, elevating the teams which finished second (USA2), third (Poland) and fourth (France) to respectively first, second and third, awarding them the relevant Medals, Titles, Trophies, Replicas and WBF Master Points

The doctors refused to return the gold medals and replacement ones were made by the WBF and awarded to USA2.

=== Mike Passell, 2015: Accusation, finding of ethical violations ===
In February 2015, Mike Passell played in a bracketed Swiss at the Palmetto Regional. Sitting North, he had tossed a board on the floor after a poor result and sometime during the next hand he claimed to have noticed a card sitting face down next to a pocket and inserted it. He stated that thinking it prudent to make sure the board was correct before the opponents took the boards to the other table, he counted the cards and found 14 in one hand and 12 in another, so he moved the extra card, which he thought was the one that had fallen out and had replaced. When results were compared, the opponents discussed the hand and there was a discrepancy with which hand held the jack of spades and a low diamond. The opponents went to Passell where he stated what had occurred; subsequently, the matter was reported to the tournament director. The opponents had won 2 IMPs on the board, but thought that more were possible had the board not been fouled.

Passell was requested to attend a meeting in Chicago during the summer Nationals of the ACBL Ethical Oversight Committee (EOC). While there were differences in the recollection of some details of the event by the players involved, Passell was found guilty of, among other things, (Note: Passell was found guilty of violating CDR 3.1 (Laws of Duplicate Bridge), 3.7 (Actions unbecoming a Member participating in an ACBL event), 3.20 (Ethical Violations) and E13 (Prearrange a deal or part thereof.) of "prearranging a deal or part thereof", which carries with it a mandatory penalty of 13 months probation and 25% of total masterpoints. He was found not guilty of cheating, but believed the public statement by the ACBL read like he was found guilty of cheating and given a lenient sentence; he appealed.

In November 2015, the ACBL Appeals and Charges committee upheld the finding of the Ethical Oversight Committee that Passell had violated sections 3.1, 3.7, and 3.20 of the ACBL's Code of Disciplinary Regulations. According to a joint statement by the ACBL and Passell,

the EOC listed only an ethical violation (but not cheating). These findings were affirmed by the Appeals and Charges Committee

— Daily Bulletin, 27 November 2016.

Passell admitted to fouling the board and failing to call the tournament director immediately. However, the Appeals and Charges Committee amended the section under which the sentencing guidelines applied. The Ethical Oversight Committee applied section E13 of the Code of Disciplinary Regulations, and the Appeals and Charges Committee applied section E18. They replaced the previous sentencing decision with a 14-day suspension starting 20 December 2015 and forfeiture of the 15.40 masterpoints earned at the event.

=== Boye Brogeland campaign against cheating, 2015 ===
In August 2015 at the Chicago NABC, Norwegian player Boye Brogeland lost a match on appeal against the Israeli players Lotan Fisher and Ron Schwartz, his former teammates at previous North American Bridge Championships. Brogeland reviewed the BBO records for the match and became convinced that they were using illegal methods to exchange information about their hands. He went on to publicly accuse Schwartz and Fisher via a website posting.

The initiative garnered support from others and Brogeland received tips that other top players were also cheating. Brogeland and others investigated further and posted their analysis and conclusions on internet websites. Ultimately, this caused teams from Israel, Monaco, and Germany to withdraw from the upcoming 2015 Bermuda Bowl and a pair from the Polish team had their credentials for that event withdrawn at the last minute. The following four partnerships were ultimately sanctioned by their respective governing bodies.

=== Fulvio Fantoni and Claudio Nunes, 2015 ===
Fantoni and Nunes were accused of exchanging information illegally. The following bridge associations concluded that they were guilty: the ACBL (North America), EBL (Europe), WBF and the Italian Bridge League. They have been barred by the foregoing for various amounts of time (ACBL for life).

Fantoni and Nunes appealed to the Court of Arbitration for Sport, which in January 2018 found in their favour, arguing that the statistical evidence was not conclusive enough. Nevertheless, the EBL publicly stated that they still would be barred from all EBL events until at least April 2019.

In the European Championship tournament 2021, Italy have included Fantoni in their team. Consequently, all other teams have boycotted the games against the Italian team. Multiple national bridge authorities issued statements of support for this boycott by their players. A petition by top US players also supported the boycott.

=== Alex Smirnov and Josef Piekarek, 2015: Confession and end of partnership ===
In September 2015, Brogeland received an anonymous tip about cheating by a top German pair Josef Piekarek-Alexander Smirnov. Faced with the evidence, Piekarek and Smirnov decided to come forward and confess with the following statement:

Josef Piekarek and I are aware of the "whispers" circulating about our ethical conduct, and we are sorry to say there is some truth to them. We regret that in the past as a partnership we committed some ethical violations. This morning we informed our Federation and our teammates, and we have all agreed that the German team should withdraw from the Bermuda Bowl.

Josef and I have voluntarily agreed never again to play competitive bridge together and to take two years off from playing competitive bridge. We hope that after such a time has elapsed, that we might be welcomed back into the competitive bridge playing community.

— Alex Smirnov, member of the German Open Team, Bridge Winners website, September 19, 2015

On 22 September 2015, Germany withdrew from the Bermuda Bowl and were replaced by France.

In June 2016, Smirnov and Piekarek were banned from all European Bridge League events by its Disciplinary Commission for a period of four years, and banned from playing as a partnership for life.

=== Cezary Balicki and Adam Żmudziński, 2015 ===
In September 2015, Brogeland also received an anonymous tip about the Polish pair Cezary Balicki–Adam Żmudziński relating to the placement of bidding cards during the auction.

On 26 September 2015, one day before play was due to start, the World Bridge Federation Credentials Committee withdrew the invitation to Balicki and Żmudziński to play in the 2015 Bermuda Bowl in Chennai, India, without giving a reason. In several articles titled "The Videos Shout: Balicki-Zmudzinski", posted in October and November 2015, Kit Woolsey presented analysis, cross-checked by a panel of experts, of video recordings of Balicki-Zmudzinski playing in the 2014 EBL European Championships in Opatija, Croatia and concluded that they used narrow or wide placement of cards from the bidding box to communicate the relative strength of their hand.

==== Hearings ====
The EBL appointed an Investigation Committee which reached the conclusion that disciplinary proceedings should be initiated against Balicki and Żmudziński for using illicit prearranged methods of communication. On 30 May 2016, a Disciplinary Commission was appointed to hear and determine the cheating allegations. After an exchange of written submissions, a hearing was held on 2 February 2017, at EBL headquarters in Lausanne, Switzerland.

The Commission concluded that the EBL had not established to the standard of comfortable satisfaction that Balicki and Żmudziński had breached Article 3 of the EBL Disciplinary Code through the use of the exchange of information by a prearranged method of communication. The Commission was of the opinion...

"that the EBL has failed to demonstrate any correlation between the – unusual – call placements and the strength of the Players’ hands. In this regard, the Commission first notes that two of the experts refused to give evidence. The Disciplinary Commission did not give any weight to the disputed evidence of an expert witness who did not give evidence at the hearing. Furthermore, in the course of the hearing it appeared that at least three of the bridge experts called by the EBL were not top class specialists of the Polish Club system, which necessarily raised questions about the accuracy of their opinions. Therefore, the EBL position on the strength of the hands, which was based on an average of all seven bridge experts’ assessment, cannot be taken into consideration."

The Disciplinary Commission ruled on 10 February 2017 that:

1. Messrs Cezary Balicki and Adam Zmudzinski have infringed Rule 3 of the Regulations during the 2014 EBL European Championships in Opatija, Croatia.
2. The evidence does not sustain a conviction of Messrs Cezary Balicki and Adam Zmudzinski for illicit exchange of information through prearranged methods of communication during the Competition.
3. No sanction shall be imposed on the Messrs Cezary Balicki and Adam Zmudzinski.
4. There shall be no order as to costs.
5. All other motions or prayers for relief are dismissed.

==== Further allegations ====
After EBL Disciplinary Commission ruling was published, further allegations regarding Balicki-Żmudziński's fair play resurfaced, in form of an anonymously edited video titled "People and their strange mannerisms". The video implied the pair used a set of hand and body gestures to enquire and show specific information about suits and key card values held by the players during defensive play of the boards, along with attempts to transmit the same information about defenders' hands from dummy to the declarer, during the Opatija championships and in a Polish Premier League match. Parts of the alleged code (finger gestures on the table surface regarding card counts in specific suits) had already been observed during the initial crowd-sourced investigation, but were discarded in favour of the bidding cards placement hypothesis.

Following these revelations, Polish Bridge Union and EBL have taken a series of decisions aiming at addressing newly resurfaced allegations:

1. On 9 March 2017, PBU President Witold Stachnik announced that a new disciplinary investigation shall be opened by PBU's Disciplinary Committee in the light of the evidence from the video.
2. On 13 March 2017, Executive Board of PBU amends PBU's Conditions of Contest to allow the Board and event organizers to refuse participants their entry to the events they organize.
3. On 16 March 2017, Executive Board of PBU uses the abovementioned amendment to refuse Balicki and Żmudziński entry to any event held under PBU supervision.
4. On 20 March 2017, PBU's Disciplinary Committee announced that in relation to the newly opened investigation, a temporary suspension has been imposed on Balicki and Żmudziński.
5. On 2 April 2017, EBL released a statement acknowledging the domestic investigation of Balicki-Żmudziński and refraining from taking further action before the investigation concludes.
6. On 31 May 2017, faced with several procedural obstacles, PBU President published a statement explaining the ongoing investigation was being conducted under a procedure which allowed for extraordinary resumption of previously closed disciplinary case (the EBL 2016-2017 proceedings with its decision adopted by PBU) and not as a new investigation, that evidence was now being analysed by the Disciplinary Committee and was subject to a ruling on merit, but imposing any sanctions on Balicki and Żmudziński was by then impossible due to the statute of limitations.

PBU's Disciplinary Committee reached its decision on 25 June 2017, ruling:

1. After analysing the collected material, to acknowledge the undisputed fact of the illegal transmission of information during the play by pair Cezary Balicki – Adam Żmudziński;
2. To refrain from punishing the accused due to expiry of the limitation of the offences referred to in § 11 sec. 2 Disciplinary Rules;
3. To leave the case without further consequences.

==== Aftermath ====
Balicki and Żmudziński never faced formal disciplinary sanctions regarding their alleged collusive transmission of illicit information. As of October 2022, the resolution refusing them entry to any PBU-regulated event is still in force.

Subsequent to the conclusion of all disciplinary investigations regarding pairs involved in the 2014 EBL European Championships, EBL revised the final standings of the event. Germany and Israel, having fielded pairs which received bans for cheating, were disqualified from the results. This moved Poland to a bronze medal position. In response, PBU, along with the Monaco team (for whom Fantoni and Nunes played in Opatija) refused to accept the place inherited through these disqualifications.

=== Online cheating admissions ===
The following admitted to cheating while playing.

Michal Nowosadzki
In July 2020, Nowosadzki admitted to cheating online by looking at all four hands "self-kibitzing".
Sylvia Shi
In July 2020, Shi admitted to cheating online by looking at all four hands "self-kibitzing".
Cédric Lorenzini
In November 2020, Lorenzini admitted to online cheating in a team event by using a side connection “...to check the scores or to follow the play as dummy...it was ethically wrong as not knowing the score of our match is part of the game...I didn't use this side connection for the purpose of influencing my plays…”
Curtis Cheek
In March 2021, Cheek admitted to cheating online by looking at all four hands ("self-kibitzing") during the United States Bridge Federation (USBF) Invitational Tournament in June 2020. Accordingly, in a negotiated resolution, the USBF imposed the following discipline:

1. Cheek is not eligible to compete in any United States Bridge Championship or to represent the USBF in any World Bridge Championship until 1 January 2024.
2. Cheek is not eligible to compete in the Open United States Bridge Championship until 1 January 2025.
3. Cheek is suspended by the USBF from 1 July 2020 through 30 June 2022, and is not eligible to compete in any other online or in-person USBF events during this time.
4. Cheek is on probation with the USBF from 1 July 2022 through 30 June 2025.
5. Cheek is not eligible to serve as a non-playing captain of any USBF Bridge team until 1 January 2025.

Cheek voluntarily relinquished the 2019 Lazard Sportsmanship Award.

== Fictional ==
Fictional instances of cheating in bridge include:

- Hugo Drax, and – by way of revenge – James Bond, in the Bond novel Moonraker by Ian Fleming
- The bridge novel Tickets to the Devil (1968) by Richard P. Powell portrays several intersecting bridge stories, one of which revolves around a major cheating accusation.
- A chapter in the bridge novel Trick 13 (1979) by Terence Reese and Jeremy Flint is devoted to the detection and proving of a case of cheating in a major tournament.
- In a scene in the Marx Brothers film Animal Crackers, the characters played by Chico and Harpo Marx blatantly cheat in a game of rubber bridge, with the opposing pair somehow remaining oblivious to this.

== See also ==
- Cheating in chess
- Cheating in poker

== Bibliography ==
=== Books ===
- Cameron, Judson J. (1933). Cheating at Bridge. Rubber bridge.
- Chua, Cathy (1998). Fair Play or Foul? Cheating Scandals in Bridge. Pioneer Books. ISBN 978-0-908065-45-5.
- Culbertson, Ely (1937). Contract Bridge Complete - The Gold Book of Bidding and Play. Philadelphia: The John C. Winston.
- Foster, R. F. Foster's Complete Hoyle. (c1897-1926)
- Hamman, Bob; Brent, Manley (1994). At the Table. Memphis, Tennessee: DBM Publications. ISBN 0-9642584-0-4. LCCN 94-67897.
- Hammond, Nicolas (2019). Detecting Cheating in Bridge (1st ed.). The author. ISBN 978-0-9822355-5-3.
- Kleinman, Danny (2005). Bridge Scandal in Houston (4th ed.). Danny Kleinman. 146 pages.
- Kleinman, Danny (2005). Bridge Internationals, Famous and Infamous (2nd ed.). Danny Kleinman.
- Manley, Brent; Horton, Mark; Greenberg-Yarbro, Tracey; Rigal, Barry, eds. (2011). The Official Encyclopedia of Bridge (7th ed.). Horn Lake, MS: American Contract Bridge League. ISBN 978-0-939460-99-1.
- Mollo, Victor (1947). Streamlined Bridge or Bidding without Tears. Illustrated by Anton (1st ed.). London: David Marlowe Ltd. Mollo ends the book with an entire chapter titled "Do you cheat?. Mollo was a rubber bridge player for money in the London clubs and describes several cheating experiences.
- Olsen, Jack (1960). The Mad World of Bridge. New York: Holt, Rinehart and Winston. LCCN 60-9675.
- Reese, Terence (1966). Story of an Accusation. New York: Simon & Schuster. LCCN 67-17872.
- Romm, Dan (2006). Things Your Bridge Teacher Won't Tell You. 158 pages.
- Scarne, John (1974). Scarne on Cards. Constable & Co. Ltd.
- Truscott, Alan (2004). The Great Bridge Scandal (2nd ed.). Toronto: Master Point Press. ISBN 1-894154-67-3.
- Vanderbilt (Contract Bridge, 1929, Charles Scribner's Sons, pp. 234–235) did not mention collusion in his list of unpardonable sins; he may have thought that it was inconceivable (WP:OR).
- The various Laws editions: the 1963 Laws (Thomas de la Rue, paperback, pp. 43–46; hardback, pp. 48–51). The hardback edition admonishes (p. 48) that "Communication between players during the auction and play periods should be effected only by means of the calls and plays themselves, not by the manner in which they are made". The 1975 Laws (Waddingtons, p. 51) went further, AFAIK for the first time: "The gravest possible offense against propriety is for a partnership to exchange information by prearranged methods other than those sanctioned by these Laws".

=== Magazines ===
The Bridge World

- Articles by Edgar Kaplan, regarded as among the most ethical players and authors in the game
  - Editorial: "Huddle Muddle", February 1970
  - Editorial: "Huddle Muddle II", March 1972
  - Editorial: "Tell-tale Rattle", May 1973. Johnny Crawford addresses the ACBL Board of Governors on the subject of cheating.
  - That Old Black Magic (title ?), an article or series of articles by Edgar Kaplan in The Bridge World during the 50s or 60s condemning what is sometimes called "hesitation relay".
- March 1975:
  - Editorial on the 'Foot Soldiers' incident in the January 1975 Bermuda Bowl.
  - Also contains an article (page 33) titled "Challenge the Champs" wherein the challengers are Zucchelli and Facchini; they win the competition against Sion-Merrill and are declared the champions.
- July 1984: editorial question regarding Sion and Cokin representing the US in the Bermuda Bowl. Also raises question as to why the ACBL did not conduct a score-adjustment hearing requested by Hann's team regarding the Goren Trophy win by Sion/Cokin/Sternberg/Weichsel/Sontag team at the 1979 National Men's Team.
- November 1984: Hooks and Crooks - the '84 Spingold. The article recounts events related to Moses Ma team withdrawal.
- November 2003: "High-tech Cheating" by Richard Aronson, pages 23–25.
- August 2015: "Another Sad Episode". Editorial, pages 2–4. The coughing German doctors.
- September 2015: "Eerily Similar". Editorial, pages 2–3. Commentary on the Italian Team Championship of 2015. Accusations made against Fantoni-Nunes; they were acquitted in a court case heard by a Sports Judge. Discussion on doing "something highly erratic that is remarkably fortunate."
- October 2015: "Stop Press", page 5. Report that Brogeland, Graves, Lindqvist and Schwartz renounce three national titles owing to "a cheating pair".
- November 2015: "The Horror Show Continues" - Editorial.
- December 2015: "An Obstinate Problem" - Editorial.

English Bridge Union Quarterly
Australian Bridge
Bridge Magazine
The New Yorker

- Owen, David (7 March 2016). "Dirty Hands". The New Yorker.

Newsweek

- Walters, John (23 August 2015). "Big, Rich Cheaters? Bridge World Rocked as Top Players Challenged". newsweek.com. about Boye Brogeland outing cheaters
