= Ron Schwartz =

Israeli bridge player

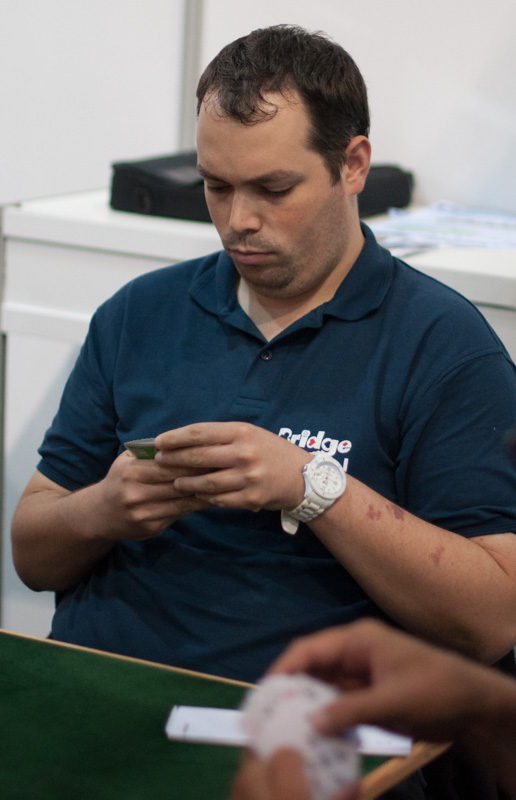
Ron Schwartz in 2014

Ron Schwartz (Hebrew: רון שוורץ) is an Israeli bridge player ranked as a World Life Master by the World Bridge Federation. First appearing in international competition at the 1st World Junior Individual Championships in New York in 2004 where he placed 61st, Schwartz' bridge career progressed at the 20th European Youth Team Championships held in Riccione, Italy in 2005 where, as a member of the Israeli junior team in the Schools division, he placed second.

In 2008, Schwartz began a partnership with Lotan Fisher which brought them progressive prominence in junior teams and junior pairs world competitions through to 2011, including several first-place finishes. In 2011, Schwartz and Fisher won the World Transnational Open Team Championship. Subsequently, they entered European-based open team competitions with continued success as members of the Israeli team, including six top ten finishes.

In May 2016, the European Bridge League imposed bans on both players for cheating; this was followed by additional sanctions by the American Contract Bridge League (ACBL) and the Israeli Bridge Federation (IBF).

== Bridge accomplishments ==
=== Wins ===
- World Series Championships – Junior Teams (1) 2010
- European Youth Team Championships – Junior Teams (1) 2011
- World Team Championships – Transnational Teams (1) 2011
- Cavendish Invitational Pairs (1) 2012
- European Team Championships – Open Teams (1) 2014
- North American Bridge Championships (1)
  - Spingold (1) 2014 (note: title stripped by ACBL)

=== Runners-up ===
- European Youth Team Championships – Schools Teams (1) 2005
- European Youth Team Championships – Junior Teams (1) 2009
- World Bridge Games – Junior Pairs (1) 2008

== Cheating scandal ==
After accusations of cheating in the 2015 Spingold team event, Schwartz and his teammate Lotan Fisher were banned from all European Bridge League events in May 2016 by its Disciplinary Commission for a period of five years, and banned from playing as a partnership for life. In 2017, Schwartz and Fisher were permanently banned from the Israeli Bridge Federation. In July 2018, Schwartz and Fisher were expelled from the American Contract Bridge League.
