= Laws of Duplicate Bridge =

Official rule book of duplicate bridge promulgated by the World Bridge Federation

The Laws of Duplicate Bridge (also known as the Laws of Duplicate Contract Bridge and the Laws of Contract Bridge) is the official rule book of duplicate bridge promulgated by the World Bridge Federation (WBF). The first Laws of Duplicate Contract Bridge were published in 1928. They were revised in 1933, 1935, 1943, 1949, 1963, 1975, 1987, 1997, 2007 and 2017. The Laws are effective worldwide for all duplicate bridge tournaments sponsored by WBF, zonal, national and subordinate organizations (which includes most bridge clubs).

== History ==
The laws were greatly influenced by Harold S. Vanderbilt in 1925 when inter alia he introduced the current concept of scoring, the use of boards to hold the cards, and the Tournament Director. The main responsibilities of the tournament director are to adjudicate on disputes and irregularities that occur during the tournament and to control the movement.

Through the 1930s, the Laws were promulgated by the Portland Club of London and the Whist Club of New York. From the 1940s onwards, their roles were supplemented by British Bridge League and European Bridge League on the European side, and American Contract Bridge League Laws Commission from the American side. From 1975 onwards, Laws were also promulgated by the World Bridge Federation Laws Commission, which claims the sole responsibility both for their content and their interpretation. In the latest edition, published in June 2017, the WBF acknowledged the historic cooperation of the Portland Club, the European Bridge League, and the American Contract Bridge League.

The American Contract Bridge League (ACBL) Laws Commission updated its own version of the Laws in September 2017. Note that, other than ACBL elections and using American spelling, the ACBL version incorporates all the changes approved by the WBF earlier that year.

== Contents ==
There are 93 articles (Laws), covering all aspects of duplicate bridge.

Due to growing popularity of online bridge, a version more suited for Electronic Bridge was issued by WBF in 2001.

== Irregularities ==
Apart from definitions of basic rules and procedures, a large part of the Laws deals with handling of irregularities that may occur at the table. As such, the Laws are primarily used as a reference book for tournament directors rather than by ordinary players (although they are expected to get acquainted with basic procedures and principles). After attention is drawn to an irregularity (which may be done by any player except by the dummy during play) the tournament director should be summoned immediately by any player and the director may impose one or more of the following rectifications in order to restore equity to a side that has been damaged by the irregularity:

- Transfer of trick(s) to the opponents,
- Force the offender or his partner to pass for one round or to the end of the auction,
- Assign penalty card status to a card inappropriately displayed, i.e. a card that must be played at first legal opportunity,
- Impose lead restrictions if the offending side becomes the defense.
- Award an artificial score, i.e. assign so-called average-plus (typically 60% of matchpoints or +3 IMPs on the board) to the non-offending side, average (50%/0 IMPs) for the partially responsible side, or average-minus (40% MPs/-3 IMPs) to the responsible side
- Award an assigned score, i.e. assign the final contract and result of the deal to the one most likely to occur had the infraction not been committed, but which favors the non-offending side.

The director's decision may be appealed to the appeals committee, whose ruling is considered final. A further appeal to the National Authority (English Bridge Union) is possible in England.

Handling of the most frequent irregularities is summarized below, without entering into fine details:

=== Revoke ===
A revoke, failure to follow suit when a player is able to, is handled by Laws 61-64. A revoke may be corrected (correct card substituted) without trick penalty before any player of the offending side plays to the next trick; otherwise, it becomes established. If a revoke is corrected, the exposed card becomes a penalty card and the opponents may change their played cards as they see fit (however, the revoking side may not take advantage of those seen cards—see Alcatraz coup).

When a revoke is established, in general, if the revoking player wins the trick, that trick, plus one of any of the tricks won by the offending side subsequent to the revoke, are transferred. Otherwise, if the offending side wins the revoke trick or a subsequent trick, one of those tricks is transferred to the opponents. (If the offending side did not win the revoke trick or any subsequent tricks, no penalty is assessed.) Additional tricks can be transferred if the revoke has caused more damage to the opponents than was redressed by those penalties. A revoke on trick 12 must be corrected, without rectification, if discovered before all four hands are returned to the board.

=== Call out of turn ===
When a player makes a call when it is not his turn to bid, the laws 30-32 specify various penalties depending on whose turn it was, and whether the call out of turn was a pass, bid, or a double/redouble. Briefly, after a call out of turn, the offender must make a call with the same or similar meaning, or their partner must pass for the remainder of the auction. The partner, rather than the offender, is prevented from bidding because it is the partner whose bid might be affected by unauthorised information.

In addition, the offending side may be subject to restrictions in the opening lead. As a special case, no penalty is assessed when it is the right-hand opponent's (RHO) turn to bid and he elects to pass. Finally, an adjusted score can be awarded if the redress was not adequate for the inflicted damage.

=== Insufficient or inadmissible call ===
After a player makes an insufficient bid (Law 27) (of lesser rank than or equal rank to the last bid at the table), the LHO first receives the option to accept it, in which case no penalty is assessed. An insufficient bid is deemed accepted if LHO has called. If rejected, the offender without penalty may replace the bid with a higher legal call that conveys the same information (but the information remains unauthorized to his partner). If the election is not to do this, or if no suitable call exists, the offender's partner must pass to the end of the auction.

An inadmissible double or redouble is canceled (as is any immediate call by LHO) and must be substituted by a legal call. The offender's partner must pass to the end of auction.

=== Exposed card ===
When a card is exposed by one of defenders (law 50), by means of holding it in such a position that it can be plausibly seen by the offender's partner, in general, it becomes a penalty card. If exposed inadvertently, depending on its rank, it may be a minor (2-9) or a major (10-A) penalty card; however, any card may become a major penalty card if played out of turn. In any case, the penalty card must be played at first legal opportunity, which allows the declarer to organize his play to take advantage of the situation. However, the offender may play an honor of the same suit instead of the minor penalty card. There is no penalty whatsoever for the exposition of declarer's cards, provided it was played inadvertently (a card apparently played advertently may not be retracted except for the purpose of revoke correction).

If a card is exposed during the auction (law 24), it may become a penalty card, and offender's partner may be forced to pass to the end of auction.

=== Play out of turn ===
In general, only the defenders are subject to penalties for opening lead or other play out of rotation (law 53-59). The offender's LHO may accept the lead. If not, the lead reverts to the correct player, and the card led out of turn becomes a major penalty card.

An opening lead out of turn (law 54) is perhaps the most frequent infraction. If the wrong defender makes the opening lead, the to-be-declarer has the following options:

- Accept the lead, spread his hand and become the dummy, and his partner declarer
- Accept the lead, spread partner's hand as dummy and play second from declarer's hand
- Refuse the lead. The illegally led card becomes a major penalty card

=== Unauthorized information ===
Unauthorized information (UI) (law 16) is any information that a player obtains by means of:

- Partner's remarks, questions, mannerisms, hesitations and similar,
- Information from calls and plays which were legally withdrawn and/or substituted as a consequence of that side's infraction (the non-offending side may use this information),
- Overhearing remarks at other tables or seeing a wrong card.

Reception of unauthorized information is not an infraction per se. However, the player who (might have) received it has severe limitation that (s)he may not act on the basis of it (even if the action is reasonable), but must select a logical alternative instead. The definition of logical alternative is fairly strict, and includes all but practically inadmissible alternative actions. However, in the (fairly unlikely) event that the logical alternative becomes a successful one rather than the action suggested by the UI, no further redress is given to the non-offending side.

The exception is when the player receives a UI inadvertently, such as by overhearing remarks at other tables. In that case, the director may adjust positions, appoint substitutes, or award an adjusted score.

=== Mistaken bid or explanation ===
It may happen that when a player is asked to explain a partnership understanding, the explanation they give is either incorrect, or that their partner gains unauthorized information (that they have bid incorrectly). Law 75 covers the proper procedure to address such a situation.

== History of the Laws of Contract Bridge ==
=== Scoring of tricks in no trump contracts ===
In the 1932 Laws of Contract Bridge, no trump tricks bid and made, and undoubled no trump tricks made but not bid, score 30, 40, 30, 40, 30, 40, 30.

In 1935 this became 40, 30, 30, 30, 30, 30, 30.

=== Scoring of undertricks ===
	before 1935	1935-1987	after 1987
not vulnerable, not doubled	50 each	50 each	50 each
not vulnerable, doubled	100, 150, 200, 250, 300, 350 etc.	100, 200, 200, 200, 200, 200 etc.	100, 200, 200, 300, 300, 300 etc.
vulnerable, not doubled	100, 150, 200, 250, 300, 350 etc.	100 each	100 each
vulnerable, doubled	200, 300, 400, 500, 600, 700 etc.	200, 300, 300, 300, 300, 300 etc.	200, 300, 300, 300, 300, 300 etc.

Redoubled undertricks have always scored twice as much as the same doubled undertricks.

The 1987 change, to the scoring of the fourth and subsequent non-vulnerable undertricks, was made after a hand in the finals of the 1981 Bermuda Bowl. Munir and Fazli, playing for Pakistan, bid skilfully to reach a vulnerable 7 hearts, which would have scored them 2210. But their non-vulnerable opponent Meckstroth then sacrificed in 7 spades on a weak hand with five spades to the jack. This went nine off doubled for a score of -1700, a profitable sacrifice. The change of scoring increased the penalty from -1700 to -2300.

Also, the "insult bonus" for making a redoubled contract used to be only 50. This was changed to 100, so that playing 5 of a minor, redoubled, making an overtrick, is always worth more than an undoubled small slam.

=== 8-Level bids ===
It has always been the intention of every official set of Laws of Contract Bridge to forbid contracts for more than seven tricks. Some versions have stated this more clearly than others, but this intention of the Laws has never changed.

=== International Match Points ===
When International Match Points were first introduced in Europe, they were as in this table.

IMP table, 1949
Point difference		IMPs	Point difference		IMPs
from	to	IMPs	from	to	IMPs
0	10	0	1000	1240	8
20	40	1	1250	1490	9
70	130	2	1500	1990	10
140	210	3	2000	2490	11
220	340	4	2500	2990	12
350	490	5	3000	3490	13
500	740	6	3500	3990	14
750	990	7	4000 or more		15

On September 1, 1962, they were changed to the table below.

IMP table, 1962
Point difference		IMPs	Point difference		IMPs	Point difference		IMPs
from	to	IMPs	from	to	IMPs	from	to	IMPs
0	10	0	370	420	9	1750	1990	18
20	40	1	430	490	10	2000	2240	19
50	80	2	500	590	11	2250	2490	20
90	120	3	600	740	12	2500	2990	21
130	160	4	750	890	13	3000	3490	22
170	210	5	900	1090	14	3500	3990	23
220	260	6	1100	1290	15	4000 or more		24
270	310	7	1300	1490	16			
320	360	8	1500	1740	17			

(after 1972, before 2002) they were changed again (FBDis, p. 22, p. 74)

== Bibliographical curiosity ==
The 1948 English edition of The International Laws of Contract Bridge has it pages numbered with odd numbers on the left-hand pages and even numbers on the right.

== See also ==
- Cheating in bridge
