= European Bridge League =

National bridge federation

The European Bridge League is a confederation of National Bridge Federations (NBFs) that organize the card game of contract bridge in European nations. In turn the EBL organizes bridge competition at the European level. It is a member of the European Olympic Committee and of the World Bridge Federation, where it constitutes one of eight "Zones" in world bridge.

Beside the administration of bridge competition (European level and European participation at the world level), the EBL provides online services for players, such as a calendar of tournaments across Europe, a list of bridge books with some reviews, and a record of major achievements by players.

The European Bridge League was established in 1947 by eight NBFs meeting in Denmark. It is incorporated in Switzerland with headquarters in Lausanne, administrative center and secretariat in Milan, Italy. From June 2010 the EBL President is Yves Aubry.

European bridge players are members of the national federations. As of 2010 there are 49 EBL member countries (NBFs) with nearly 400,000 member players. In turn that is nearly 40% of the countries and 60% of the players under the auspices of the World Bridge Federation.

Contestants from EBL member countries have achieved great success at the world level. They won 22 of 27 medals in bridge at the first World Mind Sports Games, 2008 in Beijing. There were six EBL members in the field of 22 for the last national teams world championship, the 2009 Bermuda Bowl, and all six advanced to the 8-team knockout stage.

== Members ==
European Bridge League members are National Bridge Federations and registered European bridge players are members of their national federations. As of 2010 there are 49 EBL member countries (NBFs) with nearly 400,000 member players. In turn the Europeans are nearly 40% of the countries and 60% of the players under the auspices of the World Bridge Federation.

Geographically the EBL members range from Iceland to Malta to Israel to Armenia, who are all members of the European Olympic Committee too. Both "bridge Europe" and "Olympic Europe" have 49 members but only 44 match. England, Scotland, and Wales compete as three nations in bridge, Denmark and Faroe Islands compete as two, but they jointly constitute Great Britain and Denmark Olympic teams. Otherwise Andorra, Azerbaijan, Macedonia, and Moldova are in Olympic Europe but do not compete in world bridge. Lebanon is in bridge Europe and Olympic Asia.

The European "Small Federations" competition, established 2007, is restricted to national teams from federations with no more than 500 members. Twelve to sixteen teams have participated in the first three renditions. Nineteen of the 49 EBL nations appear to be eligible.

At the other extreme, France and Netherlands account for half of the 384,000 players. Five other nations constitute another 30%: Italy, Germany, England, Denmark, and Sweden. Thus the seven largest bridge nations have 80% of Europe's registered bridge players. (Note: Presumably the role of membership differs across NBFs. The big federations field strong national teams but they do not dominate competition in the open category. In the 2009 Bermuda Bowl, Bulgaria (500 players) placed third in the world and Russia (1000) placed 5th–8th. For the 2011 Bermuda Bowl, Bulgaria and Iceland (1000 players) are two of seven EBL teams in the field. Poland (6500 players) is a "bridge power" in all categories.)

Forty of the 49 EBL nations entered at least one national team in the 2010 European Team Championships: 38 in the Open category, 28 Women, and 23 Senior teams.

== Championships ==
Perhaps the primary EBL responsibility is to conduct those championships which accord the title European champion.

=== National teams ===
The marquee championships for national teams are now biennial in even years. The 2012 rendition was officially the 51st, which recognizes some that predate the EBL.

The European Bridge League (est. 1947) has conducted the event from 1948 when competition was resumed after World War II. Previously and first in 1932 it was organized by the International Bridge League, predecessor of the World Bridge Federation (est. 1958).

The Open flight was first contested in 1932, the Women in 1935, and the Senior in 1995.

=== Other ===
The European Open Bridge Championships are biennial in odd years since 2003.

The European Champions' Cup annually since 2002.

The EBL organizes youth events annually in July, for youth teams and pairs that represent EBL member countries.

The European Small Federations Trophy is contested by teams representing bridge nations with up to 500 members.

== Controversy ==
In the 2021 European championships, Italy included Fulvio Fantoni on its team, a player previously sanctioned for cheating. In protest, the remaining national teams refused to play against the Italians and subsequently forfeited their games.

Several national bridge associations indicated support for the forfeitures. The Italian Bridge Federation vigorously protested the actions of the forfeiting players and their National Bridge Organizations (NBO) urging that the European Bridge League expel them from the tournament.

== See also ==
- American Contract Bridge League
- List of bridge governing bodies
