= Senior Bowl (bridge) =

Bridge tournament for players 60 and older

The d'Orsi Senior Bowl, or Senior Bowl or d'Orsi Bowl, is a biennial world championship contract bridge tournament for national teams of "Seniors", players age 60 and older. (Note: Seniors in world bridge are people who turn age 60 or greater during the calendar year: for 2011, people born 1951 or earlier. Through 2005 the minimum age was 55. It was increased to age 60 by holding the defining year at 1950 for six years; thus all Seniors remained eligible during the transition. Senior Bridge. WBF. Retrieved 2011-12-04.) It is contested every odd-number year under the auspices of the World Bridge Federation (WBF), alongside the Bermuda Bowl (Open), Venice Cup (Women) and Wuhan Cup (Mixed). Entries formally represent WBF Zones as well as nations so it is also known as the "World Zonal Senior Team Championship", one of three "World Zonal Team Championships". It became an official world championship event in 2001 following a successful exhibition in 2000.

The d'Orsi Senior Bowl is also the trophy awarded to the winning team. It was donated at the 2009 tournament in Brazil by former WBF President Ernesto d'Orsi, (Note: At the time, the Brazilian d'Orsi had been Chairman of both the WBF Competition & Tournament Committee and its Rules & Regulations Committee since 1995; Chairman of the WBF Master Points Committee since 2002; and President of CSB (Zone 3, South America) since 2008. • "International record for Ernesto D'ORSI". World Bridge Federation.. Retrieved 2011-12-08.) and the tournament was renamed at that time.

The most recent event took place in 2023 in Marrakesh, Morocco.

== Structure ==
The zonal quotas and structures are now identical for the Open, Women, and Seniors flights of Zonal Teams, and the three tournaments are concurrent. There are 22 teams —1 from the host country, 6 from Europe, and so on— each four to six players and a captain who may be one of the players. (Note: There may be others in the party, including some listed in the WBF database, such as a coach (for example, "International record for Eric Kokish". World Bridge Federation.). They are not official team members.) They compete as teams-of-four with scoring by International Match Points (IMP).

For one week everyone plays round-robin matches of 16 deals, three daily matches (21 in all) with IMP margins converted to Victory Points (VP). Teams who draw get 15 points each, up to 25 for the winner and down to 0 for the loser.

The eight round-robin leaders continue in long knockout matches, 96 deals in two days (except 128 in three days for the Open final), with carryover as much as 16 IMP from the short matches between the same teams. The World Transnational Open Teams Championship begins after most teams are eliminated from the three major events; players on all but the four semifinalist teams in each flight are welcome to enter the Transnational.

== 2000 exhibition ==
For the 50th anniversary of the Bermuda Bowl in January 2000, the World Teams returned to Bermuda for Bermuda Bowl and Venice Cup tournaments completing the 1998–1999 cycle. A short exhibition for Seniors was added to the program, as was the (third) World Computer Bridge Championships. (Note: The first and second computer bridge championships were conducted at the 1997 and 1998 Summer North American Bridge Championships. 2000 World Teams, Event: World Computer Bridge Championships.)

Six invited teams contested the exhibition for Seniors: four national teams, one from North America, and "World Champions" comprising one pair each from Austria, Bulgaria, and Israel. The two Austrians and two Israelis had played on both winners of the (transnational) World Senior Teams Championship, 1994 and 1998, with one of the two Bulgarians as a teammate in 1998.

The six played a double round-robin, ten matches of 20 deals, during the first five days of the main events, followed by two days of playoff matches. Thus all participants were able to enter the Transnational Open Teams contested during the second week of the main events.

Poland defeated France in the 60-deal final by 229 to 73 IMP. France scored slightly better in the first of three sessions but the second and third were routs by Poland.

Year, Site, Entries		Medalists
2000 (exhibition) January 8–14 Southampton, Bermuda 6 teams	1.	Poland; Aleksander Jezioro, Julian Klukowski, Janusz Nowak, Stefan Szenberg, Andrzej Wilkosz
2000 (exhibition) January 8–14 Southampton, Bermuda 6 teams	2.	France; Pierre Adad, Maurice Aujaleu, Claude Delmouly, Jean-Marc Roudinesco
2000 (exhibition) January 8–14 Southampton, Bermuda 6 teams	3.	China; Gu XUEHAI, Li Jin, Lu YULIN, Tang HOUZU, Lu ZHENTING

Standings in the round-robin stage were identical to the final standings. Only Poland and France scored better than average (150 Victory Points, equivalent to ten ties) followed by China, North America, World Champions, and Australia.

In two one-day semifinals Poland beat North America 190–74 and France beat China 145–83, while World Champions won a fifth-place match against Australia 130–53. On the final day Poland beat France in 60 deals and China won third place in 40 deals against North America, 133 to 80.

Official world championship flights for Seniors were added to both the quadrennial World Team Olympiad beginning 2000 (ten months later) and to the biennial World Team Championships beginning 2001 (twenty months later).

== Results ==
The first Senior Bowl trophy debuted in 2001 and the eponymous tournament for senior teams joined the official "World Team Championships" program beside the Bermuda Bowl and Venice Cup for open and women teams. From eight teams in 2001 the field quickly expanded to match the other flights in size with 22 teams each by 2005.

United States teams won the first four Senior Bowls while the other United States team twice finished third. Three Americans in different combinations won three apiece: Roger Bates, Grant Baze, and Garey Hayden. Indonesia has won three medals and European teams have won eight, with England and France winning the last two Bowls.

Year, Site, Entries		Medalists
2001 Oct 21–Nov 3 Paris, France 8 teams	1.	(United States) USA 2 (Note: Annual rankings published by the WBF show double representation for the US in all Senior Bowl tournaments. Select "Venue" links at "World Team Championships to Date". Retrieved 2011-08-17.); Grant Baze, Gene Freed, Garey Hayden, Joe Kivel, Chris Larsen, John Onstott
2001 Oct 21–Nov 3 Paris, France 8 teams	2.	(Poland) Poland; Wit Klapper, Jerzy Russyan, Stefan Szenberg, Włodzimierz Wala, Andrzej Wilkosz
2001 Oct 21–Nov 3 Paris, France 8 teams	3.	(France) France; Pierre Adad, Maurice Aujaleu, Claude Delmouly, François Leenhardt, Christian Mari, Marc Schneider
2003 November 2–15 Monte Carlo, Monaco 15 teams	1.	(United States) USA 1 Roger Bates, Grant Baze, Garey Hayden, Gaylor Kasle, Steve Robinson, Kit Woolsey
2003 November 2–15 Monte Carlo, Monaco 15 teams	2.	(France) France; Pierre Adad, Maurice Aujaleu, Guy Lasserre, François Leenhardt, Christian Mari, Philippe Poizat
2003 November 2–15 Monte Carlo, Monaco 15 teams	3.	(United States) USA 2 Dennis Dawson, Arnold Fisher, Zeke Jabbour, Clement Jackson, John Mohan, John Sutherlin
2005 Oct 22–Nov 5 Estoril, Portugal 22 teams	1.	(United States) USA 1 Roger Bates, Garey Hayden, Rose Meltzer, Alan Sontag, Lew Stansby, Peter Weichsel
2005 Oct 22–Nov 5 Estoril, Portugal 22 teams	2.	(Indonesia) Indonesia; Arwin Budirahardja, Henky Lasut, Eddy Manoppo, Denny Sacul, Munawar Sawiruddin, Amiruddin Yusuf
2005 Oct 22–Nov 5 Estoril, Portugal 22 teams	3.	(Denmark) Denmark; Jens Auken, Flemming Dahl, Peter Lund, Kirsten Steen Møller, Steen Møller, Georg Norris
2007 Sep 29–Oct 13 Shanghai, China 22 teams	1.	(United States) USA 2 Roger Bates, Grant Baze, Bart Bramley, Rose Meltzer, Alan Sontag, Lew Stansby
2007 Sep 29–Oct 13 Shanghai, China 22 teams	2.	(Indonesia) Indonesia; Henky Lasut, Anindara Lubis, Eddy Manoppo, Denny Sacul, Munawar Sawiruddin, Ferdinand Robert Waluyan
2007 Sep 29–Oct 13 Shanghai, China 22 teams	3.	(United States) USA 1 Dan Gerstman, Gaylor Kasle, Dan Morse, Ron Smith, John Sutherlin, Bobby Wolff
2009 Aug 29–Sep 12 São Paulo, Brazil 22 teams	1.	(England) England; Paul D Hackett, Gunnar Hallberg, Ross Harper, John Holland, David Price, Colin Simpson
2009 Aug 29–Sep 12 São Paulo, Brazil 22 teams	2.	(Poland) Poland; Julian Klukowski, Apolinary Kowalski, Krzysztof Lasocki, Victor Markowicz, Jacek Romanski, Jerzy Russyan
2009 Aug 29–Sep 12 São Paulo, Brazil 22 teams	3.	(Indonesia) Indonesia; Arianto Karna Djajanegara, Michael Bambang Hartono, Henky Lasut, Eddy Manoppo, Denny Sacul, Munawar Sawiruddin
2011 October 15–29 Veldhoven, Netherlands 22 teams	1.	France; Patrick Grenthe, Guy Lasserre, François Leenhardt, Patrice Piganeau, Philippe Poizat, Philippe Vanhoutte
2011 October 15–29 Veldhoven, Netherlands 22 teams	2.	(United States) USA 2 Peter Boyd, Neil Chambers, Gaylor Kasle, Larry Kozlove, Steve Robinson, John Schermer
2011 October 15–29 Veldhoven, Netherlands 22 teams	3.	Poland; Julian Klukowski, Apolinary Kowalski, Krzysztof Lasocki, Victor Markowicz, Jacek Romanski, Jerzy Russyan

France won the 2011 d'Orsi Bowl by 165 to 160 IMP in a two-day final match against USA 2, the second of two qualifiers from the United States.

USA 2	_{6+}	8	11	20	_{45+}	79	17	19	160+
France	^{0}	45	21	23	^{89}	13	30	33	165

The Americans started with 6.33 IMP carryover from the 16-deal round-robin match, meaning France must score at least 7 IMP better on the 96 deals of the final. France yielded almost nothing during the first three segments, to lead overnight by 89 to 45+ including carryover. The Americans posted a huge fourth set, 79 IMP on 16 deals to regain the lead, but France again yielded almost nothing in the last two segments, and only 75 IMP on 80 deals in the five good segments.

The final lead change occurred on the 87th deal (#23) where France played 5♦ and made it while USA played at a 4♦ opening bid. France never led by so much as 11 IMP, which is attainable at once, and the final margin less than 5 IMP commonly scored at once. So the outcome "went to the end", even for spectators (who know the score, as players don't). (Note: Players at the table know the score precisely only at the beginning of a segment, when lineups may be changed too. Neither communication with active players nor their replacement is permitted during a segment and inactive players are likely to be among the spectators at the end of a close match.)

There were 22 national teams in the field, who represented the eight WBF zones as follows. The regular quota for Europe is six teams, seven at Veldhoven because the host country qualifies automatically.

Europe: Poland, Denmark, Italy, France, Germany, Bulgaria, Netherlands —ranks 1 to 6 and 12 in the European championship
North America: Canada, USA 1, USA 2
South America: Argentina, Brazil
Asia & Middle East: India, Pakistan
C. America & Carib.: Guadeloupe
Pacific Asia: China Hong Kong, Indonesia, Japan
South Pacific: Australia, New Zealand
Africa: Egypt, Réunion

The first stage was a full round-robin scheduled in advance. (Note: Schedule of Play / d'Orsi Seniors Bowl. 2011. WBF. Given the single round-robin structure, the particular schedule should make little difference to the outcome of the first stage.) Every team played 21 short matches of 16(?) deals at three per day.

2013 October 16–29 Nusa Dua, Bali 22 teams	1.	(United States) USA 2 Roger Bates, Garey Hayden, Marc Jacobus, Carolyn Lynch, Mike Passell, Eddie Wold
2013 October 16–29 Nusa Dua, Bali 22 teams	2.	Poland; Julian Klukowski, Apolinary Kowalski, Krzysztof Lasocki, Victor Markowicz, Jacek Romanski, Jerzy Russyan
2013 October 16–29 Nusa Dua, Bali 22 teams	3.	France; Patrick Grenthe, Guy Lasserre, Francois Leenhardt, Alain Levy, Philippe Poizat, Philippe Vanhoutte

There was a cheating scandal at the 2013 event. The original winners, Germany, were disqualified, and the WBF moved USA 2 to first place, Poland to second and France to third.

The 2015 championship, held in Chennai, India, was won by USA1 ahead of Sweden, with Poland third ahead of USA2.

2015 September 26 - October 10 Chennai, India 22 teams	1.	(United States) USA 1 Bob Hamman, Mark Lair, Hemant Lall, Zia Mahmood, Reese Milner, Michael Rosenberg, Petra Hamman (npc), Jacek Pszczola (coach)
2015 September 26 - October 10 Chennai, India 22 teams	2.	(Sweden) Sweden; Sven-Ake Bjerregard, Per Gunnar Eliasson, Anders Morath, Johnny Ostberg, Goran Sellden, Bjorn Wenneberg, Tommy Gullberg (npc), Carina Wademark (coach)
2015 September 26 - October 10 Chennai, India 22 teams	3.	(Poland) Poland; Julian Klukowski, Apolinary Kowalski, Krzysztof Lasocki, Victor Markowicz, Jacek Romanski, Jerzy Russyan, Wlodzimierz Wala (npc), Andrzej Biernacki (coach)
2017 August 12-26 Lyon, France 22 teams	1.	(United States) USA 2 Michael Becker, David Berkowitz, Allan Graves, Neil Silverman, Alan Sontag, Jeff Wolfson, Steve Garner (npc)
2017 August 12-26 Lyon, France 22 teams	2.	(Italy) Italy; Andrea Buratti, Amedeo Comella, Giuseppe Failla, Aldo Mina, Ruggero Pulga, Stefano Sabbatini, Pierfrancesco Parolaro (npc)
2017 August 12-26 Lyon, France 22 teams	3.	(Sweden) Sweden; Mats Axdorph, Christer Bjaring, Sven-Ake Bjerregard, Bengt-Erik Efraimsson, Anders Morath, Johnny Ostberg, Tommy Gullberg (npc), Carina Wademark (coach)
2019 September 14-28 Wuhan, China 24 teams	1.	Denmark; Knud Aaage Boesgaard, Soren Christiansen, Henrik Norman Hansen, Jorgen Cilleborg Hansen, Hans Christian Nielsen, Steen Schou, Bo Loenberg Bilde (npc), Jan Nielsen (coach)
2019 September 14-28 Wuhan, China 24 teams	2.	England; John Holland, David Kendrick, Alan Mould, David Muller, Malcolm Pryor, Trevor Ward, David S Jones (npc)
2019 September 14-28 Wuhan, China 24 teams	3.	India; Sukamal Das, Subhash Dhakras, Dipak Poddar, Subrata Sabha, Jitendra Solani, Ramamurthy Sridharan, Vinay Desai (npc), Anal Shah (coach)
2022 March 27 - April 9 Salsomaggiore Terme, Italy 24 teams	1.	Poland; Apolinary Kowalski, Michal Kwiecien, Victor Markowicz, Krzysztof Moszczynski, Jacek Romanski, Wlodzimierz Starkowski, Wlodzimierz Wala (npc)
2022 March 27 - April 9 Salsomaggiore Terme, Italy 24 teams	2.	India; Rajesh Dalal, Sukamal Das, Ashok Kumar Goel, Anil Padhye, Krishnan Ramaratnam, Subrata Sabha
2022 March 27 - April 9 Salsomaggiore Terme, Italy 24 teams	3.	Denmark; Klaus Adamsen, Jorgen Cilleborg Hansen, Dennis Koch-Palmund, Dorthe Schaltz, Peter Schaltz, Steen Schou, Peter Magnussen (npc), Bo Loenberg Bilde (coach)
2022 March 27 - April 9 Salsomaggiore Terme, Italy 24 teams	3.	France; Michel Abecassis, Marc Bompis, Alain Levy, Philippe Marill, Dominique Pilon, Philippe Soulet, Guy Lasserre (npc), Solange d'Elbee (coach)
2023 August 20 - September 2 Marrakesh, Morocco 24 teams	1.	Denmark; Klaus Adamsen, Jorgen Cilleborg Hansen, Dennis Koch-Palmund, Dorthe Schaltz, Peter Schaltz, Steen Schou, Peter Magnussen (npc), Morten Bilde (coach)
2023 August 20 - September 2 Marrakesh, Morocco 24 teams	2.	Poland; Piotr Bizon, Marek Blat, Michal Kwiecien, Victor Markowicz, Krzysztof Moszczynski, Wlodzimierz Starkowski, Jacek Pszczola (npc), Miroslaw Cichocki (coach)
2023 August 20 - September 2 Marrakesh, Morocco 24 teams	3.	(United States) USA 1 Drew Casen, Andy Goodman, Venkatrao Koneru, Jim Krekorian, Mike Passell, Pratap Rajadhyaksha, Alex Kolesnik (npc)

== Zones and nations ==
There are eight geographic zones and eight associated zonal bridge federations, all permitted to enter at least one team in the Bermuda Bowl since 199? (Africa). The members of zonal bridge federations are national federations (NBOs) where "nations" are defined by NBO admission to membership in a WBF zonal federation and thus in the WBF. Wales, China Hong Kong, and French Polynesia are bridge nations in Europe, Pacific Asia, and South Pacific, for current examples. Zonal membership defines nominal geography: bridge Europe includes Lebanon and Israel, and previously included Egypt. Venezuela has represented South America (twice, 1966 and 1967) and Central American and the Caribbean (five or six of seven times, 1985 to 1997). Zones may be represented only by teams that comprise players from one nation, or national teams in one sense. Further, there may be only one entry from one nation, except that North America is permitted two from the United States in its quota of three. Some zones select representatives by international tournaments which permit only one team from any bridge nation; that is, by competition among national teams in a second sense. The European Team Championships are the oldest and largest example, where ranks 1 to 6 subsequently represent Europe in the World Teams. North America does routinely pass on the nominations of two United States teams (selected by the USBF) and selects its third by a two-team "tournament" if Canada and Mexico both choose to enter a national team.

=== Exceptions ===
- North America, formerly represented by North America teams that were sometimes transnational in composition.
- Central America & Caribbean, formerly represented by transnational teams such as Guadeloupe/Martinique.
Before the Senior Bowl grew to match the size of the Open and Women fields, 22 teams, there were transnational entries from Egypt and South Africa in 2001, Argentina and Brazil in 2003.

== Medals (2001-2023) ==
Rank	Nation	Gold	Silver	Bronze	Total
1	United States (USA)	7	1	3	11
2	Denmark (DEN)	2	0	2	4
3	Poland (POL)	1	4	2	7
4	France (FRA)	1	1	3	5
5	England (ENG)	1	1	0	2
6	Indonesia (INA)	0	2	1	3
7	India (IND)	0	1	1	2
7	Sweden (SWE)	0	1	1	2
9	Italy (ITA)	0	1	0	1
Totals (9 entries)		12	12	13	37

== See also ==
- World Team Olympiad
- 2021 World Bridge Team Championships
