= Keohane North American Swiss Teams =

North American bridge championship

The Keohane North American Swiss Teams bridge championship is held at the fall American Contract Bridge League (ACBL) North American Bridge Championship (NABC).

The Keohane North American Swiss Teams is a six session Swiss Teams event, two qualifying sessions, two semi-final sessions and two final sessions that takes place over three days. The event typically starts on the second Friday of the NABC. The event is open.

== History ==
The event was introduced in 1977. The trophy was donated by Ethel Keohane in memory of her husband, William H. Keohane (1896–1972).

The Keohane Trophy was presented for the Open Individual Championship until it was re-designated in 1995 by the ACBL Board of Directors for the North American Swiss Teams.

== Winners ==
Winners of Keohane North American Swiss Teams
Year	Winners	Runners-up
1977	Neil Chambers, Jim Donaldson, Bruce Ferguson, Clarence Goppert, John Schermer	Dennis Clerkin, Jerry Clerkin, John Herrmann, Ken Schutze
1978	Barry Crane, Bob Kehoe, Mike Smolen, Charles Weed, Billy Cohen	Ira Chorush, Thomas Peters, Ely Solomon, John Zilic, Virginia Zilic
1979	Hermine Baron, R. Jay Becker, Paul Ivaska, Jim Robison	Gerald Caravelli, Mark Cohen, Ralph Katz, Harvey Miller, Ken Schutze, Russell Shoup
1980	1-2. Steve Becker, Philip Cowan, Richard DeMartino, Judy Rich; 1-2. Dale Beers, William Epperson, Dave Furman, Dave Treitel	
1981	Ron Beall, Bob Etter, Ann Jacobson, Bob Thomson	Lea Dupont, Benito Garozzo, Glenn Lublin, Claire Tornay
1982	Gaylor Kasle, Garey Hayden, Garnet Snyder, Martha Beecher, David Ashley, Dave Treadwell	Andy Bernstein, Jim Foster, Tommy Sanders, John Sutherlin
1983	Sylvia Summers, Harve Waken, Robert Radwin, Gene Simpson, Steve Sturm	2-3. Philip Cowan, Michael Kopera, Alan Miller, John Heller, George Berger; 2-3. Richard Capps, John Onstott, Dan Requard, Syd Levey
1984	Grant Baze, Rhoda Walsh, Lea Dupont, Benito Garozzo	William Laubenheimer, Stephen Kanzee, Marc Renson, Hamish Bennett
1985	Jack Coleman, Rhoda Walsh, Jim Jacoby, Gaylor Kasle, Garey Hayden	Nadine Wood, Jonathan Steinberg, Eric Hochman, Mike Cappelletti
1986	Marc Jacobus, Joey Silver, Jim McDonough, George Mittelman, Allan Graves	Jack Coleman, Rhoda Walsh, Mark Itabashi, Gaylor Kasle, Garey Hayden
1987	Henry Bethe, Kitty Bethe, Alan Truscott, Dorothy Hayden Truscott	Jill Meyers, Beverly Rosenberg, Stelios Touchtidis, Steve Cohen, Pam Wittes, Carol Pincus
1988	John Zilic, David Siebert, Allan Siebert, Sylvia Summers, Paul Munafo	Rita Rand, Gerald Caravelli, Joel Friedberg, Ethan Stein, Jerry Goldfein
1989	Eugene Gardner, Kenneth Meyer, Ed Shapiro, Bruce Silverstein	Joel Friedberg, Rita Rand, Ethan Stein, Gerald Caravelli, Jerry Goldfein
1990	1-2. Larry Mori, Kitty Bethe, Juanita Chambers, Jim Robison; 1-2. George Rosenkranz, Miguel Reygadas, Gaylor Kasle, Garey Hayden, Roger Bates, John Grantham	
1991	Keith Wilson, Gary Peterson, Dennis Hesthaven, Ralph Letizia, Benton Wheeler	Jack Coleman, Judi Radin, Fred Hamilton, Dennis Sorensen, Mike Shuman
1992	Lewis Kaplan, Boris Baran, Geoff Hampson, Mark Molson, Mark Stein	Jack Coleman, Mike Shuman, Larry T. Cohen, Dan Rotman, Fred Hamilton
1993	Alan Lebendig, Tom Clarke, Joe Quinn, Shawn Womack	Lynn Blumenthal, Steve Bruno, Loren Hawkins, Darrell Keel, Sue Lyski
1994	Jack Coleman, Drew Cannell, Mark Molson, Boris Baran, Mark Stein	Barry Rigal, JoAnn Manfield, Alan Truscott, Dorothy Truscott
1995	Jack Coleman, Drew Cannell, Mark Molson, Boris Baran, Mark Stein	Irina Levitina, Judy Tucker, Benito Garozzo, Lea Dupont, Karen Allison, Mike Ledeen
1996	Rita Rand, Gerald Caravelli, Arnie Fisher, Steve Garner, Richard Colker	John Begley, Mike Lawrence, John Sutherlin, Dan Morse, Hugh Ross
1997	John Malley, Dan Colatosti, Bill Hunter, Shome Mukherjee	Jacob Podbilevich, Gonzalo Herrera, Jim Looby, Cameron Doner
1998	Steve Beatty, John Onstott, Bobby Goldman, Mark Lair	Jack Coleman, Chris Compton, Boris Baran, Mike Shuman, Mark Molson
1999	David Berkowitz, Larry N. Cohen, Jeff Wolfson, Neil Silverman	Billy Miller, Curtis Cheek, Brian Gunnell, Kyle Larsen
2000	Steven Cooper, Kitty Munson Cooper, Mel Colchamiro, Janet Colchamiro, Betty Bloom, Steve Bloom	Benito Garozzo, Lea Dupont, Steve Levinson, Barnet Shenkin
2001	Richard Coren, Billy Eisenberg, Larry T. Cohen, Drew Casen	Richard Haplerin, Colin Revell, Leonard Ernst, Paul Erb, George Pisk
2002	Mark Gordon, Richard Zucker, Winthrop Allegaert, Jaggy Shivdasani, Mark Molson, Boris Baran	Robert Hollman, Marc Jacobus, Gaylor Kasle, Eric Greco, Geoff Hampson
2003	David Siebert, Allan Siebert, Greg Hinze, Nagy Kamel	Ron Feldman, B. Wayne Stuart, Steve Cohen, Drew Casen, Larry T. Cohen, Wafik Abdou
2004	Larry Mori, Venkatrao Koneru, Marty Fleisher, Vincent Demuy, Barnet Shenkin, Gavin Wolpert	Piotr Tuszyński, Jaroslaw Piasecki, Farid Assemi, Eduard Wojewoda, Waldemar Frukacz, Apolinary Kowalski
2005	Barry Rigal, Pam Granovetter, Joe Quinn, Shawn Quinn, Becky Rogers, Renee Mancuso	Dan Morse, Ira Hessel, Nagy Kamel, Greg Hinze
2006	Tony Kasday, Disa Eythorsdottir, Jón Baldursson, Thorlakur Jonsson, Bjarni Einarsson, Sigurbjorn Haraldsson	Carolyn Lynch, Dennis Dawson, Eddie Wold, Mike Passell, Larry N. Cohen, David Berkowitz
2007	Larry Mori, Rick Kaye, Kazuo Furuta, Hiroki Yokoi, Kelley Hwang, Leonard Melander	William Watson, Ed Barlow, Bill Harker, Ronald Powell, Yul Inn, Rob Stevens
2008	Carolyn Lynch, Mike Passell, Joe Grue, Curtis Cheek, Bart Bramley, Eddie Wold	Waldemar Frukacz, Ron Zambonini, Krzysztof Kotorowicz, Jacek Kalita
2009	Cezary Balicki, Alexander Dubinin, Andrey Gromov, Carolyn Lynch, Mike Passell, Adam Żmudziński	Winthrop Allegaert, Judy Bianco, Lapt Chan, Justin Lall, Hemant Lall, Jaggy Shivdasani
2010	Dennis Clerkin, Jerry Clerkin, Mike Levine, Dennis McGarry, David Siebert	Josef Blass, Rafał Jagniewski, Krzysztof Jassem, Michał Kwiecień, Krzysztof Martens
2011	Les Bart, Gloria Bart, Nader Hanna, Piotr Klimowicz	Justine Cushing, Jiang Gu, Melih Ozdil, Xiaodong Shi, Jian-Jian Wang
2012	Dennis Bilde, Lars Blakset, Anders Hagen, Apolinary Kowalski, Reese Milner, Jacek Romański	Vincent Demuy, John Kranyak, Paul Fireman, Gavin Wolpert, Krzysztof Buras, Grzegorz Narkiewicz
2013	Rose Meltzer, John Mohan, Diego Brenner, Carlos Pellegrini, Steve Robinson, Peter Boyd	Shan Huang, Jan Jansma, Michael Polowan, Darren Wolpert, John Valliant, Ron Zambonini
2014	Carolyn Lynch, Mike Passell, Garey Hayden, Cezary Balicki, Adam Zmudzinski	Bartosz Chmurski, Josef Blass, Marcin Lesniewski, Piotr Tuszynski, Jacek Kalita, Michal Nowosadzki
2015	Stan Tulin, Jacek Kalita, Michal Nowosadzki, Dror Padon, Alon Birman, Kevin Dwyer	Mike Passell, Marc Jacobus, Piotr Tuczynski, Marcin Lesniewski, Bartosz Chmurski, Josef Blass
2016	Eddie Wold, Cornelis Van Prooijen, Louk Verhees Jr. Mike Levine, Dennis Clerkin, Jerry Clerkin	Stan Tulin, Jacek Kalita, Michal Nowosadzki, Dror Padon, Alon Birman, Kevin Dwyer
2017	Agnes Snellers, Berend Van Den Bos, Joris van Lankveld, Wubbo De Boer	Patricia Cayne, Bob Drijver, Bart Nab, Dano De Falco, Danny Molenaar, Tim Verbeek
2018	Junjie Hu, Yichao Chen, Yanhui Sun, Jun Shang, Bo Fu	Justin Lall, Shan Huang, Kevin Bathurst, Kevin Dwyer, Joyce Hill
2019	Andrzej Knap, Arthur Wasik, Nikolay Demirev, Rose Meltzer, Piotr Nawrocki, Piotr Wiankowski	Veri Kiljan, Luc Tijssen, Thibo Sprinkhuizen, Guy Mendes De Leon, Alison Wilson
2020	Canceled due to COVID-19	Canceled due to COVID-19
2021	Piotr Pawel Zatorski, Massimiliano Di Franco, Ron Pachtmann, Andrea Manno, Nicolas L'Ecuyer, Paul Street	Gary Donner, Marion Michielsen, Cecilia Dwyer Rimstedt, Joe Grue, Brad Moss, Per-Ola Cullin
2022	Franck Multon, Vasileios Vroustis, Kiki Ward-Platt, Giacomo percario, Giovanni Donati, Nikolaos Delimpaltadakis	Mike Levine, Jeff Meckstroth, David Berkowitz, Geir Helgemo, Fredrik Nystrom, Eddie Wold
2023	Franck Multon, Leonardo Cima, Giorgio Duboin, Marc Bompis, Francisco Bernal, Miguel Villas-Boas	Fredrik Nystrom, Johan Upmark, Simon Hult, Leif Bremark, Antonio Palma, Frederic Wrang
2024	Sun Xudong, Fu Zhong, Xinli Gan, Jike Jin, Lidang Dong,	Barry Rigal, Jeff Aker, John Lusky, Eric Stoltz, Glenn Milgrim, Ron Rubin
2025	Douglas Simson, Eric Rodwell, Joel Wooldridge, David Grainger, Bar Tarnovski, Asaf Yekutieli	Ming Sheng, Edward Xu, Yan Wang, Alex Hong

== Sources ==
"ACBL - NABC Winners". acbl.com. ACBL. Archived from the original on 4 February 2012.

List of previous winners, Page 7 Daily Bulletin (PDF), vol. 81–8, November 28, 2008, archived from the original (PDF) on December 16, 2014

2008 winners, Page 1 Daily Bulletin (PDF), vol. 81–11, December 1, 2008
