= Frank Merblum =

American bridge player

Franklin "Frank" Merblum is an American bridge player. He lives in Bloomfield, Connecticut.

Merblum and regular partner Doug Doub have two firsts and two seconds in the annual grass-roots North American Pairs championship (Flight A), spanning from 2001 to 2014. They have won the New England (District 25) stage eight times.

In 2018 Merblum reached the semi-finals of the US Bridge Championships playing with Jeffrey Juster on a team with Adam Grossack, Zachary Grossack, Howard Weinstein, and Adam Wildavsky.

== Bridge accomplishments ==
=== Wins ===
- North American Bridge Championships (4)
  - Grand National Teams (1) 2016
  - Von Zedtwitz Life Master Pairs (1) 2014
  - North American Pairs (2) 2001, 2010

=== Runners-up ===
- North American Bridge Championships (3)
  - North American Pairs (2) 2003, 2014
  - Grand National Teams (1) 2008
