= Doug Doub =

American bridge player (born 1955)

Douglas D. Doub (born May 28, 1955) is an American bridge player. He lives in West Hartford, Connecticut (2014).

Doub and Frank Merblum have two firsts and two seconds in the annual grass-roots North American Pairs championship (Flight A), spanning from 2001 to 2014. They have won the New England (District 25) stage eight times.

Doub won a World Bridge Federation (WBF) bronze medal in the 2003 Bermuda Bowl playing with Adam Wildavsky on a team that was the surprise winner in the United States Bridge Championships - Open Teams earlier that year. They became the "USA2" team, USA1 having been determined in the 2002 USBC. (Beginning 1991 the biennial world teams championships fields include two U.S. teams called "USA1" and "USA2".) From the 22-team round-robin they advanced to the 8-team knockout by a one-point margin, beat Poland and lost to USA1 in two-day quarterfinal and semifinal matches, and beat Norway in the bronze medal playoff. As one of three pairs on the 2009 open team led by Steve Robinson, Doub–Wildavsky won the U.S. open teams championship and participated in the Bermuda Bowl as USA1.

== Bridge accomplishments ==
=== Wins ===
- North American Bridge Championships (9)
  - Mixed Board-a-Match Teams (1) 2018
  - Grand National Teams (1) 2016
  - Von Zedtwitz Life Master Pairs (1) 2014
  - North American Pairs (2) 2001, 2010
  - Lebhar IMP Pairs (1) 2008
  - Fast Open Pairs (1) 2008
  - Reisinger (1) 2002
  - Mitchell Board-a-Match Teams (1) 1997

=== Runners-up ===
- North American Bridge Championships
  - Fast Open Pairs (2) 2004, 2006
  - Nail Life Master Open Pairs (1) 2011
  - North American Pairs (2) 2003, 2014
  - Grand National Teams (1) 2008
  - Mitchell Board-a-Match Teams (1) 2009
