= Jan Martel (bridge) =

American bridge player (born 1943)

Janet Friedman Martel (born February 26, 1943) is an American bridge player from Davis, California. A graduate of University of California, Berkeley, she is a retired attorney and a past president of the United States Bridge Federation (USBF). She is married to Chip Martel, a world champion bridge player. She was previously married to Lew Stansby, another world champion player. Her parents, Milton and Rose Friedman, were both free market economists. Her brother, David D. Friedman, is an anarcho-capitalist theorist.

Martel has won seven national championships, or national-rated events at North American Bridge Championships meets. Playing under the name Jan Stansby with Pat Leary in 1974, she won the Whitehead Women's Pairs, the premier ACBL annual championship for women pairs. (Note: The ACBL Hall of Fame provides only a citation, or short bridge biography, without information about Jan Martel's birth or marriages. But the organization's online database "NABC Winners" provides for Jan Stansby her entire record of wins and runners-up in national-rated events.)

She was inducted into the ACBL Hall of Fame in 2012.

== Bridge accomplishments ==
=== Honors ===
- ACBL Hall of Fame, Blackwood Award, 2012
- ACBL Honorary Member, 2018

=== Wins ===
- North American Bridge Championships (7)
  - Whitehead Women's Pairs (1) 1974
  - Grand National Teams (1) 2009
  - Machlin Women's Swiss Teams (1) 1986
  - Wagar Women's Knockout Teams (1) 1994
  - Sternberg Women's Board-a-Match Teams (1) 1986
  - Chicago Mixed Board-a-Match (1) 2001
  - North American Pairs Flight A (1) 1988

=== Runners-up ===
- North American Bridge Championships (7)
  - Whitehead Women's Pairs (1) 1988
  - Grand National Teams (1) 2006
  - Machlin Women's Swiss Teams (1) 1996
  - Wagar Women's Knockout Teams (3) 1980, 1985, 1987
  - Chicago Mixed Board-a-Match (1) 2004
