= Mark Molson =

Canadian bridge player (1949–2006)

John Markland "Mark" Molson (28 April 1949 – 19 January 2006) was a Canadian professional bridge player from Montreal and Fenton, Michigan.

He was a member of the Molson family and attended Selwyn House School. He also attended Bishop’s College School (BCS) in Lennoxville, QC graduating in 1966.

Most frequently partnered with Boris Baran, he won the Canada national bridge team Championships seven times, seven North American Bridge Championships, and came in second as a member of the Canada open team in the 1995 Bermuda Bowl.

On September 5, 1998, his daughter, Jennifer Rose Molson, was born. He married fellow bridge world champion Janice Seamon-Molson, Jennifer's mother, on March 16, 1999. Janice is still a highly ranked Bridge player and Jennifer attended the New York Film Academy for musical theatre.

Molson died suddenly of complications during an operation for a dissected aortic aneurism. This medical issue first surfaced while Mark was playing golf.

He and Baran were inducted into the Canadian Bridge Federation Hall of Fame in 2013.

== Bridge accomplishments ==
=== Awards ===
- Herman Trophy (1) 1989
- Richmond Trophy (5)
- Canadian Bridge Federation Hall of Fame, 2013

=== Wins ===
- North American Bridge Championships (7)
  - Blue Ribbon Pairs (1) 1989
  - Grand National Teams (1) 2002
  - Keohane North American Swiss Teams (4) 1992, 1994, 1995, 2002
  - Reisinger (1) 1989

=== Runners-up ===
- North American Bridge Championships
  - Wernher Open Pairs (1) 1992
  - Keohane North American Swiss Teams (1) 1998
  - Reisinger (1) 1982
  - Spingold (1) 1982
