= Gillian Miniter =

American bridge player

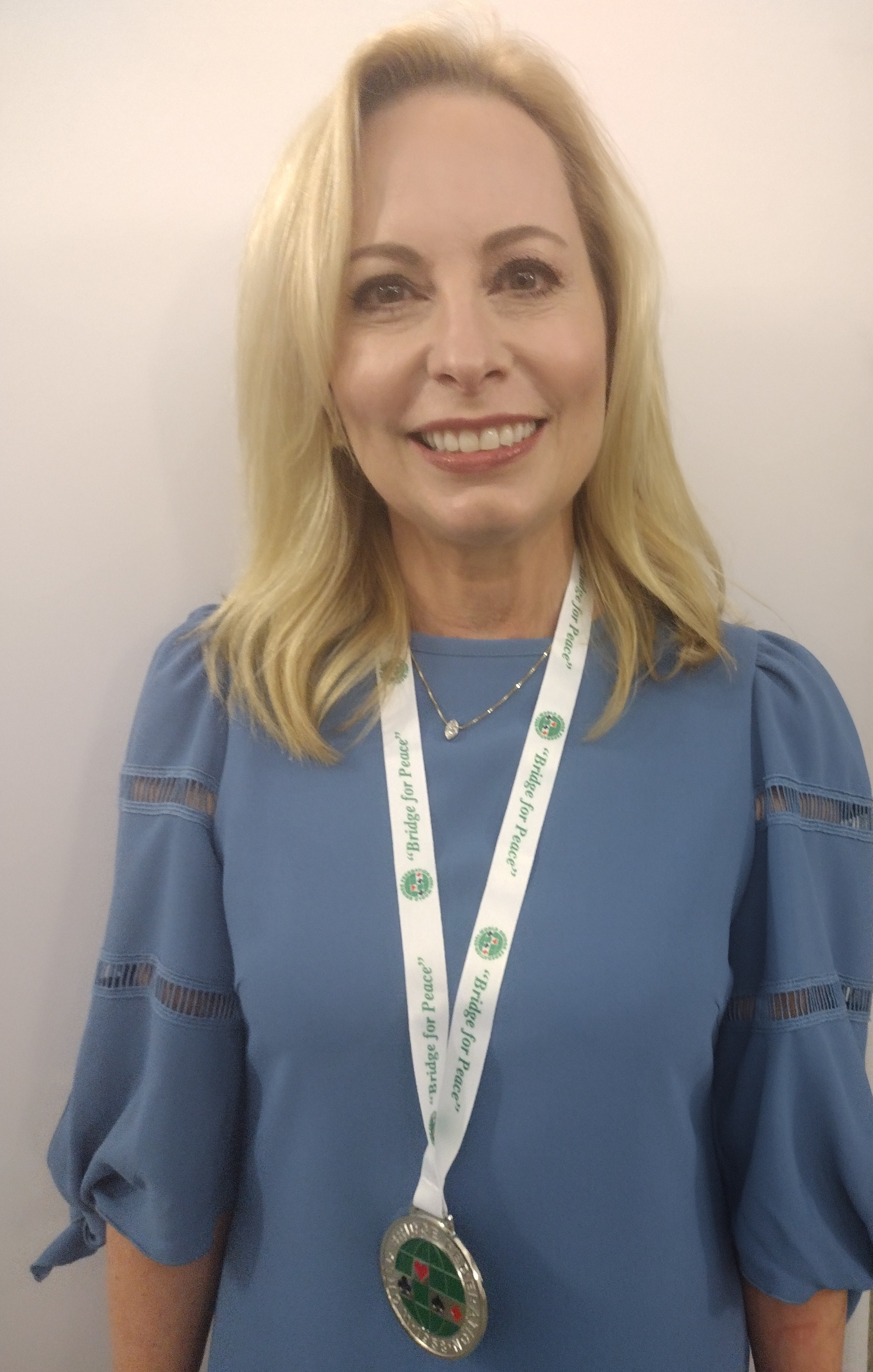
- Gillian Miniter
- Born: Gillian Miniter

Gillian Miniter is an American silver-medallist World Champion bridge player. She came second in the Mixed Teams event in Wrocław in 2022.

== Bridge accomplishments ==
=== Winner ===
- South American Bridge Championships Transnational Teams (1) 2024

=== Runners-up ===
- World Bridge Series Mixed Teams (1) 2022
- North American Bridge Championships (1)
  - Grand National Teams (1) 2019
