= Dan Rotman =

American bridge player

Daniel "Danny" Rotman (born 1932) is a professional American bridge player from Aventura, Florida.

Rotman is a retired businessman and graduated from Bradley University.

== Bridge accomplishments ==
=== Wins ===
- North American Bridge Championships (6)
  - von Zedtwitz Life Master Pairs (1) 1959
  - Grand National Teams (1) 1978
  - Mitchell Board-a-Match Teams (1) 1985
  - Chicago Mixed Board-a-Match (2) 1969, 1988
  - Spingold (1) 1987

=== Runners-up ===
- North American Bridge Championships
  - Silodor Open Pairs (2) 1963, 1973
  - Vanderbilt (1) 1989
  - Keohane North American Swiss Teams (1) 1992
  - Mitchell Board-a-Match Teams (1) 1965
  - Reisinger (1) 1967
