= Grand National Teams =

North American bridge championship

The Grand National Teams (GNT) North American bridge championship is held at the summer American Contract Bridge League (ACBL) North American Bridge Championship (NABC).

The Grand National Teams is a team knockout event. The event is broken into four flights (Championship, A, B, C). The event is restricted to those who have qualified in their local ACBL district. No player on a flight A team can have more than 6,000 masterpoints. No player on a flight B team can have more than 2,500 masterpoints. No player on a flight C team can have more than 500 masterpoints, or be a Life Master.

All flights typically begin play on Wednesday, two days before the main NABC events.

The 2011 host district won Flights B and C in Toronto and thereby won the unofficial GNT Cup.

== History ==
The United States Bridge Association, established by Ely Culbertson and his staff, conducted a Grand National Team-of-Four championship from 1934 to 1937 (the lifetime of the organization before merger created the ACBL).

The extended, grass-roots tournament was re-established in 1973, when about 1500 teams participated. Initial stages were contested in the 25 geographically defined ACBL Districts. Champions of eight Zones were determined in a semifinal stage, who qualified for the final stage at one of the North American NABC meets.

By 1980 there were 6032 teams in the first stage, although the distinct Canadian National Teams championship was introduced by the Canadian Bridge Federation that year, leaving only the 23 U.S. or partly U.S. districts in the GNT. (The ACBL encompasses Mexico and Bermuda, but each is entirely within a partly U.S. District.)

The Zonal stage was eliminated in 1985; since then every District champion qualifies for the final at the Summer NABC. Conditions within the Districts differ; some now hold a single weekend tournament. Winners received some money to pay expenses in part.

Also in 1985, the event was divided in three Flights called A, B, and C. The Championship Flight was added in 2001. That is, Flights B and C were added to the Open Flight in 1985, with player eligibility restricted by upper limits on career masterpoints. In 2001 the previously open Flight A was renamed "Championship" or "Superflight" and Flight A was restricted to players with fewer than 5,000 career masterpoints. As of 2012 the other ceilings were 2,000 points for Flight B players and 500 points for Flight C. In 2014 the cutoff for Flight A was raised to 6,000 masterpoints and the cutoff for Flight B was raised to 2,500 masterpoints.

The Open winners have their names engraved on the Morehead Trophy, donated by The New York Times in memory of its longtime bridge editor Albert H. Morehead.

== Championship Flight ==
Grand National Teams finalists, Open Flight
Year	Dist	Winners	Dist	Runners-up
1973	9	Russ Arnold, James Beery, Jane Jaeger, Richard Pavlicek, William Seamon, Robert G. Sharp		Dave Smith, Byron Economidy, Jerry Levitt, Roger Lord, Norb Kremer, Ron Smith
1974		Larry T. Cohen, Billy Eisenberg, Eddie Kantar, Richard H. Katz, Paul Soloway, John Swanson	12	Chuck Burger, Fred Hamilton, Howard Perlman, Stanley Smith, Jeffrey Starr, Dick Yanko
1975	16	John Fisher, Charles Gabriel, Bob Hamman, Jim Hooker, Charles Weed, Bobby Wolff		Mike Cook, Jim Felts, Doug Hill, Reece Rogers, Ron L. Smith, Bernie Yomtov
1976		Billy Eisenberg, Eddie Kantar, Paul Soloway, John Swanson		Marty Fleisher, Charlie Friedman, Ron Gerard, Halina Jamner, Archie McKellar, Neil Nathanson
1977	16	Bob Hamman, Dan Morse, Curtis Smith, Eddie Wold, Bobby Wolff	6	Bobby Lipsitz, Steve Parker, Steve Robinson, Kit Woolsey
1978	13	Gerald Caravelli, Charles Peres, William Rosen, Milton Rosenberg, Dan Rotman	9	Allan Cokin, Bobby Levin, Bud Reinhold, William Seamon, Steve Sion
1979	13	Greg DeFotis, Jerry Goldfein, Arnold Leavitt, Larry Robbins, Claude Vogel		Marty Bergen, Chuck Lamprey, Warren Rosner, Allan Stauber
1980		Jack Bitman, Jan Janitschke, Craig Janitschke, Dick Lesko	9	Russ Arnold, Edith Kemp, Bill Passell, Cliff Russell, William Seamon, Dave Strasberg
1981	16	Ira Chorush, Jim Jacoby, Mike Passell, George Rosenkranz, Eddie Wold	24	Mike Becker, Brian Glubok, John Lowenthal, Phillip Martin, Michael Rosenberg, Ron Rubin
1982	21	Ron Von der Porten, Hugh Ross, Chip Martel, Lew Stansby, Kyle Larsen, Peter Pender; Jeff Polisner (npc)	12	Steve Landen, Pratap Rajadhyaksha, Jeff Starr, Frank Bell, Chuck Burger
1983	21	Chip Martel, Hugh Ross, Peter Pender, Lew Stansby	7	Lou Blumn, Larry Gould, Randy Joyce, Nick Nickell, Richard Freeman
1984	6	Kit Woolsey, Ed Manfield, Peter Boyd, Bobby Lipsitz, Steve Robinson	13	Greg DeFotis, Larry Robbins, Jerry Goldfein, Hal Mouser, Jack Oest, Gerry Caravelli
1985	21	Chip Martel, Hugh Ross, Lew Stansby, Peter Pender; Alfred Sheinwold (npc)	6	Steve Robinson, Eddie Manfield, Peter Boyd, Bobby Lipsitz
1986	16	Seymon Deutsch, Bobby Wolff, Bob Hamman, Jim Jacoby	13	Milt Rosenberg, Ralph Katz, Hal Mouser, Greg DeFotis, Larry Robbins, Howard Weinstein
1987	21	Chip Martel, Hugh Ross, Peter Pender, Lew Stansby, Mike Lawrence		Frank Hoadley, Sidney Lazard, John Onstott, Jack LaNoue
1988	6	Steve Robinson, Ed Manfield, Peter Boyd, Bobby Lipsitz	13	Jack Oest, Steve Garner, Jerry Goldfein, Bart Bramley, Gerry Caravelli, Howard Weinstein
1989	25	Steve Sion, Robert Barr, Harold Stengel, Bernie Miller		Tony Kasday, Paul Ivaska, Gaylor Kasle, Garey Hayden, Roger Bates
1990	11	Doug Simson, Walter Johnson, Jeff Meckstroth, Eric Rodwell, Dennis Clerkin		Kay Larsen, Chris Larsen, Joe Kivel, Robert Rosenblum, Evan Bailey
1991	13	Larry Robbins, Jerry Goldfein, Jack Oest, Peter Nagy, Steve Garner, Howard Weinstein		Marty Bergen, Larry N. Cohen, Fred Stewart, Steve Weinstein
1992	6	Steve Robinson, Peter Boyd, Bobby Lipsitz, Ed Manfield	9	Mike Becker, Ron Rubin, Richard Pavlicek, Bill Root, Bobby Levin, Jeff Wolfson
1993	21	Ravindra Murthy, Brad Moss, Lew Stansby, Chip Martel, Hugh Ross, Jeff Ferro		Brian Ellis, Asim Ulke, Florine Walters, Richard Finberg, Jay Apfelbaum, Piyush Vakil
1994	24	Jimmy Cayne, Alan Sontag, David Berkowitz, Larry N. Cohen	11	Doug Simson, Walter Johnson, Eric Rodwell, Jeff Meckstroth
1995	13	Steve Garner, Jack Oest, Larry Robbins, Jerry Goldfein, Gerald Caravelli, Gary Cohler		Billy Cohen, Marc Jacobus, Harold Lilie, Peter Nagy
1996	21	Ralph Buchalter, Hugh Ross, Kyle Larsen, Ron Smith, Chip Martel, Lew Stansby	12	Chuck Burger, Geoff Hampson, Allan Falk, Perry Johnson
1997	9	Jeffrey Wolfson, Bobby Levin, Jeff Meckstroth, Neil Silverman, Richard Pavlicek, Michael Seamon	10	Hjördis Eythorsdottir, Curtis Cheek, Steve Beatty, John Onstott
1998	22	Ross Grabel, Jon Wittes, Mark Itabashi, Fred Hamilton, Gene Simpson	16	Bobby Goldman, John Sutherlin, Malcolm Brachman, Mike Passell, Eddie Wold
1999	9	Joseph Shay, Michael Seamon, Bobby Levin, Jeff Meckstroth, Eric Rodwell	23	Jill Meyers, Ed Davis, Mitch Dunitz, Iftikhar Baqai
2000	9	Joseph Shay, Michael Seamon, Bobby Levin, Jeff Meckstroth, Eric Rodwell	21	Rose Meltzer, Peter Weichsel, Ron Smith, Kyle Larsen, Chip Martel, Lew Stansby
2001	23	Jill Meyers, Ed Davis, Mitch Dunitz, Iftikhar Baqai	21	Rose Meltzer, Peter Weichsel, Hugh Ross, Kyle Larsen, Chip Martel, Lew Stansby
2002	9	Russ Ekeblad, Sheila Ekeblad, Jeff Meckstroth, Michael Seamon, Eric Rodwell, Mark Molson	17	Lou Ann O'Rourke, Roger Bates, Garey Hayden, Billy Miller, Marc Jacobus
2003	21	Rose Meltzer, Peter Weichsel, Hugh Ross, Kyle Larsen, Chip Martel, Lew Stansby	9	Larry Griffey, Spike Lay, Jeff Meckstroth, Eric Rodwell, Michael Seamon, Russ Ekeblad
2004	9	Jim Mahaffey, Michael Seamon, Gary Cohler, Barnet Shenkin, Jeff Meckstroth, Eric Rodwell	16	Malcolm Brachman, Bart Bramley, Sidney Lazard, Mike Passell, Eddie Wold
2005	12	Howard Perlman, Chuck Burger, Perry Johnson, Michael Zerbini	9	Jim Mahaffey, Barnet Shenkin, Eric Rodwell, Jeff Meckstroth, Michael Seamon, Gary Cohler
2006	16	Bob Hamman, Petra Hamman, Hemant Lall, Justin Lall, John Sutherlin, Peggy Sutherlin	21	Jan Martel, Chip Martel, JoAnna Stansby, Lew Stansby, Kit Woolsey, Sally Woolsey
2007	9	Mike Becker, Warren Spector, Larry N. Cohen, David Berkowitz, Jeff Meckstroth, Eric Rodwell	24	Glenn Milgrim, Chris Willenken, Roy Welland, Bobby Levin
2008	9	Mike Becker, Warren Spector, Larry N. Cohen, David Berkowitz, Jeff Meckstroth, Eric Rodwell	25	Doug Doub, Frank Merblum, John Stiefel, Lloyd Arvedon, Victor King, Sheila Gabay
2009	21	Rose Meltzer, Kyle Larsen, Chip Martel, Jan Martel, Kit Woolsey, Sally Woolsey	24	Joe Grue, John Hurd, Kevin Bathurst, Shane Blanchard, Bob Blanchard, Brian Glubok
2010	11	Walter Johnson, Doug Simson, Dennis Clerkin, Jerry Clerkin	23	Jill Meyers, Mitch Dunitz, Walter Schafer, Ed Davis
2011	9	Warren Spector, Mike Becker, David Berkowitz, Gary Cohler, Jeff Meckstroth, Eric Rodwell	6	Steve Robinson, Peter Boyd, Steve Landen, Bill Pettis, Bill Cole, Beth Palmer
2012	9	Warren Spector, Mike Becker, David Berkowitz, Gary Cohler, Jeff Meckstroth, Eric Rodwell	24	Jared Lilienstein, Sam Lev, Brian Glubok, John Hurd, Michael Polowan, Joel Wooldridge
2013	9	Warren Spector, Mike Becker, David Berkowitz, Gary Cohler, Jeff Meckstroth, Eric Rodwell	24	Jared Lilienstein, Sam Lev, Brian Glubok, John Hurd, Michael Polowan, Joel Wooldridge
2014	9	Michael Seamon, Richard Coren, Kevin Bathurst, Kevin Dwyer, Jeff Meckstroth, Eric Rodwell	21	Richard Spitalnick, Edward Barlow, Srikanth Kodayam, Nick Bykov, Chip Martel, Kit Woolsey
2015	9	Warren Spector, Mike Becker, Jeff Meckstroth, Eric Rodwell, David Berkowitz, Gary Cohler	19	Dick Yarington NPC, Ken Scholes, Bryan Maksymetz, Dan Jacob, Rock Shi Yan
2016	25	Douglas Doub, Franklin Merblum, Adam Grossack, Zachary Grossack	21	Chip Martel, Kit Woolsey, Lew Stansby, Jo Anna Stansby, Debbie Rosenberg, David Grainger
2017	21	Chip Martel, Kit Woolsey, Lew Stansby, Jo Anna Stansby, Debbie Rosenberg, David Grainger	9	Richard Coren, Kevin Bathurst, Kevin Dwyer, Russell Ekeblad, Jeff Meckstroth, Eric Rodwell
2018	9	David Berkowitz, Eric Rodwell, Gary Cohler, Warren Spector, Jeff Meckstroth, Michael Becker	17	Joshua Donn, Roger Lee, Sylvia Shi, Daniel Korbel
2019	17	Fred Gitelman, Geoff Hampson, Haig Tchamitch, Roger Lee, Daniel Korbel, Sheri Winestock	24	Joe Grue, John Hurd, Kent Mignocchi, Gillian Miniter, Joel Wooldridge
2020	Cancelled			
2021	9	Jeff Wolfson, Jeff Meckstroth, Kevin Dwyer, Shan Huang, Gary Cohler, David Berkowitz	2	Jacob Freeman, Daniel Lavee, John Carruthers, Martin Kirr, Bo Han Zhu, Darren Wolpert
2022	7	B Wayne Stuart III, Jerry Helms, Sam Marks, Dwight Meredith, George Woltman, Olin Hubert	9	Allison L Cappelletti, Janice Seamon-Molson, Mike Cappelletti Jr., Jack Weingold, Jeff Meckstroth, Gary Cohler
2023	9	Jeffrey Wolfson, Kevin Bathurst, David Berkowitz, Jeff Meckstroth, Jerry Stamatov, Jack Zhao	25	John Stiefel, Allan Graves, Franklin Merblum, Geoffrey Brod, Douglas Doub, Mark Aquino
2024	17	Alain Schreiber, Geoff Hampson, Bobby Levin, Billy Miller, Roger Lee, Brad Moss	25	Harrison Luba, Emma Kolesnik, Adam Grossack, Cenk Tuncok
2025	25	Gillian Miniter, Joe Grue, John Hurd, Joel Wooldridge, Iulian Rotaru	6	Steve Robinson, Bill Cole, Mark Shaw, Alan Schwartz, Alan Sontag, Mike Gill

== Lower flights ==
Grand National Teams finalists, Flight A (as second of four flights)
Year	Dist	Winners	Dist	Runners-up
	From 2001 "A" is the second of four flights. Previously it was the Open flight (above).			
2001	20	Merlin Vilhauer, Pam Stratton, Robert Johnson, Bruce Cuthbertson, Mark Litterman	6	Lyle Poe, Rusty Krauss, David Butler, Raphael Kahn, Barry Falgout, Mark Dahl
2002	9	Adrian Dovell, Patricia Dovell, John Moschella, John Brady, Bob Dennard, Brian Gunnell	14	Bob Balderson, Cindy Balderson, Kurt Schaeffer, Carole Miner
2003	16	Buddy Hanby, Sally Wheeler, Patricia Griffin, James Griffin	5	Niel Waletzky, Stan Dub, Don Sulgrove, Kathleen Sulgrove
2004	6	Sumner Steinfeldt, Marshall Kuschner, Hal Hindman, Mark Chen	12	Mark Leonard, Thomas Rozinski, Barry Lippitt, Richard Mydloski
2005	7	Jonathan Slaney, John Lowell, Jeff Ziemer, Robert Fendrick, Hugh Hughes, Gregory Roberts	24	Valentin Carciu, David Gurvich, Michael Lipkin, Ira Ewen, Sorin Pleacof
2006	2	Doug Baxter, Daniel Korbel, David Grainger, Danny Miles, Andy Stark	16	Charles Price, Mark Bumgardner, Stan Kohan, Greg Hinze, Marcus Poe, Tom Edwards
2007	12	Michael Alioto, Sheldon Kirsch, Barry Lippitt, Frank Sensoli, Robert Cappelli	24	Valentin Carciu, Michael Lipkin, David Gurvich, Sorin Pleacof, Ljudmila Kamenova
2008	24	James Scott, Harry Apfel, John Ramos, Kelley Hwang, Valentin Carciu, Sorin Pleacof	11	Sheryl Langner, Shan Au, Charles Kopp, Gregory Potts
2009	23	Chien Yao Tseng, John Ramos, David Kempe, Matt Klimesh	19	Dave Grubbs, Kevin Bolan, John Maki, Bill O'Brien
2010	4	Elliot Shalita, Andy Kaufman, Rick Olanoff, Doug Dye, Howard Cohen, Corey Krantz	7	Lance Shull, Audrey Ventura, Jon Rice, Doug Dey
2011	14	Kurt Schaeffer, Kerry Holloway, Bjorgvin Kristinsson - Keith Connolly	24	Igor Savchenko, Ljudmila Kamenova, Doug Herron - Bill Begert, Valentin Carciu, Sorin Pleacof
2012	23	Edward Piken, Robert Kent, Viktor Anikovich, Howard Einberg, Fred Zhang, Paul Markarian	6	Barry Bragin, Brad Theurer, Noble Shore, Michael Gill
2013	22	Shoichi Yoshihiro, Philip Hiestand, Weishu Wu, Xiao-Yan Gong, Bo Liu	16	Anthony Bianchi, Gary King, Mitch Towner, Robert Whitcher
2014	21	Crispin Barrere, Mark Moss, Robert Thomson, Sathya Bettadapura	11	John Hinton, Bob Lyon, Craig Satersmoen, Ryan Schultz
2015	6	Stan Schenker, Mark Laken, Barry Falgout, Rusty Krauss, Stephen Drodge, John Miller	3	Dori Byrnes, Sylwia McNamara, Michael McNamara, Ron Nelken, Robert Stayman, John Boyer
2016	6	Alexander Prairie, Stephen Drodge, Jian-Jian Wang, Sylvia Shi	19	Amy Gao, William Ge, James Wu, Ben Takemori
2017	25	Barry Bragin, Weiling Zhou, Michael Hess, Gary Miyashiro, Susan Smith, Michael Smith	22	Weishu Wu, Sudhir Helekar, Jay Helekar, Xiao-Yan Gong
2018	2	Colin Lafferty, Doug Andrews, Melvin Norton, Keith Heckley	9	Edward Schusler, Albert Simpson, James Scott, David Treitel, Saul Gross, Juan Castillo
2019		Edward Schusler, Saul Gross, James Scott, David Treitel, Juan Castillo, Bruce Lang	22	Rick Kerbel, Jim Johnsen, Fran White, Davis Bennett
2020	Cancelled			
2021	16	Hua Yang, Yan Sung, Danny Feng, Lunhui Lin	9	Juan Castillo, Luisana Madueno, Maris Zilant, Linda Epstein
2022	6	Jian-Ping Chen, Shihong You, Weizhong Bao, Huailin Chen	16	Ari Sippola, Pawel Hanus, Ying Peng, James Zhan
2023	19	Eric Sieg, Kim Eng, Kevin Bolan, Jeff Ford	25	Maxim Siline, Carrie Liu, Melody Bi, Anton Tsypkin
2024	12	Ching-Po Wang, Yanping Zhang, Cristina Tita, Timur Aydin	2	Roger Chu, Peter Wong, Pengqiao Qu, Fang Zue, Tiger Hu, Fan Yang
2025	12	Ching-Po Wang, Yanping Zhang, Zachary Wasserman, Michael McDonald	10	Charles Durrin, Paul Linxwiler, Michael Weir, Grant Zhang

Grand National Teams finalists, Flight B
Year	Dist	Winners	Dist	Runners-up
1985		Irving Goodman, Floyd Dyson, Leo Takelfman, Tim McPhail, Louis Richardson		Sally Grace, Linda Weinstein, Sharon Meng, Jennifer James, Jerry Poliquin, Robert Buchner
1986	6	Paul McGowan, George Towner, Winston Edwards, Regena Jones (replaced Lizzie Hepburn)		Ken Connell, Linda Connell, Carla Eisenhauer, S. K. Carruthers, Claire Jones, Dennis Nelson
1987		Dwight Hunt, Ed Horwitz, Ken Kadish, Claude LeFeuvre		Bob Webb, Pat Webb, Kevin Chen, Joseph Blalock
1988		Steven Beck, Michael Camp, Win Allegaert, Fred Chang		Jean Molnar, Michael Weber, Down Holmer, Walter Riddle, Joseph Rubin
1989		George Runyan, Tim Joder, Iype Koshy, Robert Dupont		Paul Nickerson, William Goldsmith, Denise Goldsmith, Cheryl Porter
1990		Judy Hughes, Karen Miller, Robert Seaholm, John Morano, Goutam Chakraborty, Krishnanand Maillacheruver	6	Jim Adams, John Edmunds, Dan Feldman, Larry Kahn, Usuf Ismail
1991		Mary Poplawski, Stanley Poplawski, William Smith, Barrett Raff	2	Bruce Norman, Fred Gitelman, Sheri Winestock, Geoff Hampson
1992		Otto Rothenberg, Richard Baumer, Arthur Haley, Bert Kulic		Nielih Cheng, Peter Kalat, Jeffery Allen, Carlos Munoz, Lp. P. Calahan, Bruce Platt
1993	6	Eric Greco, Philip Greco, Kefu Xu, Harry Zhou, David Better		Jack Jessop, Morrie Kleinplatz, Barry Onslow, Elaine Morrison
1994		Larry Crevier, Sylvain Descoteaux, Marc-Andre Fourcaudot, Frederic Pollack	2	Glen Holman, Eric Sutherland, Darren Wolpert, Hazel Wolpert
1995		Larry Crevier, Frederic Pollack, Sylvain Descoteaux, Marc-Andre Fourcaudot	2	Darren Wolpert, Hazel Wolpert, Gordon Brown, Sam Yoga
1996	20	David Green, Edward Lee, Chien Huang, Robert Johnson		David Walker, Roberts Moore, Jim Hawkins, Geoffrey Mallette
1997		Harold Jordan, Sigridur Kristjansdottir, Andy Kaufman, Greg Burch		Steve Albin, Elaine Pittius, Julia Ehlers, Mike McNamara
1998		Robert Latulippe, Rene Pelletier, Jocelyn Bernier, Richard Wildi, Jacques Carel, Herve Chatagnier	6	Richard Wegman, Kefu Xu, Yi Zhong, Weizhong Bao
1999		Henry Caspar, Tom Buttle, Claude King, Ringo Chung, Helen DeWild, Vinay Sarin		Dennis Thompson, Steve Albin, David Liss, Jack Brauner
2000		Michael Moffatt, Tai Eng, Insa Fricker, Gilbert Lambert		John Turner, Ralph Russo, Mark de Garcia, David Shipman
	From 2001 "B" is the third of four flights rather than second of two.			
2001		Gary Moore, Chris Lubesnik, Kevin Bathurst, Lisa Liberati, Randolph Hammock, Ari Greenberg	12	Michael Alioto, Robert Cappelli, Frank Sensoli, Deborah DeWitt
2002	15	Gary McDole, Fred Dischman, Chad Fisher, Larry Weatherholt	4	Barry Cohen, Nick Straguzzi, Bill Grosnick, Everett Young
2003	6	Hailong Ao, Jian-Jian Wang, Huailin Chen, Yi Zhong	1	Ovidiu Stanica, Rick Soderstrom, Jack Brown, Ron Zambonini
2004	21	Sathya Bettadapura, Jim Leuker, Bruce Tuttle, Shelley Lapkoff, Tanakorn Lavanakul	14	Jonathan Cohen, Charles Nauen, Mark Krusemeyer, Patti Stuhlman
2005	21	Li-Chung Chen, Chuck Wong, Clark Millikan, Alex Staykov, Samuel Ieong, Tanakorn Lavanakul	8	Jim Hudson, Meyer Abarbanel, Arbha Vongsvivut, Mike Giacaman
2006	25	Bernard Schneider, Frances Schneider, Allan Wolf, Russell Friedman	5	Dan Roseberry, John Bacon, John Tscholl, Jim Overcasher
2007	21	John Barth, Jiang Chen, Mike Develin, Nongyu Li	25	Robert McCaw, Florin Constantin, Gregory Ingolia, Lewis Gamerman
2008	23	Joseph Viola, Gerard Geremia, Matt Klimesh, David Kempe	5	Dian Petrov, Michael Ryan, Donna Steffan, James Gullo
2009	11	Beve Smith, John Clark, Danny Barnett, Lamar Hamilton	23	Robert C.F. Wang, Shiu-Ming Huang, Eric Tan, Frank Shih
2010	14	Eric Hendrickson, Paul Gutterman, Andy Caranicas, Richard Lawson	15	Paul Chan, Lily Chan, Mark De Garcia, Gregory Barnes
2011	2	Craig Macintosh, John Cook, Aleksandar Vujic, Andrew Collins, Charles Halasi, David Halasi	21	Eugene Hung, Andrew Hoskins, Steve Chen, Sarah Chen
2012	5	Michael Creager, John Bacon, Fred Yellen, Judith Padgug	3	Stephen Garreffa, David Katzen, Adam Lally, Dana Rossi
2013	11	Joseph Keim, William Gottschall, Lori Harner, Donna Moore, Douglas Millsap, Larry Jones	21	Eugene Hung, Han-Yu Chang, David Weinberg, Steve Chen, Stephen Tu, Lynn Shannon
2014	16	Jennifer Breihan, James Breihan, Mike Doyle, Daniel Jackson, Bill McCarty	20	Daniel Neill, Weiming Hu, Atul Khare, Justin Beck, Douglas Bullock, Dmitriy Myedvyedyev
2015	11	AJ Stephani, John Meinking, Darin Campo, Robert Fisk, Ryan Schultz, Peter Whipple	17	Gregory Herman, Burke Snowden, Dawn Foltz, Gregory Foltz, Mark Robertson, Richard Jacobson
2016	23	Om Chokriwala, Zheng Zhang, Jack Chang, Fredrick Upton, Nolan Chang, James Perkins	22	Ian Wilson, Gregory Thorp, Joseph Mack III, Steve Hirsch
2017	21	Jim Liu, Peter Sun, Jun Shi, Qaing Zhang, Ethan Liu	9	Grant Petersen, Zachary Wasserman, Thomas Thomson, Michael Kraut, Ching-Po Wang, Xingyu Zhang
2018	12	Bob Rasmussen, David Aderente, Wilbur Argersinger, Timur Aydin, Ching-Po Wang	9	Mark Raphaelson, Cabot Jaffee Jr, Lance Marrou, Ping Chen
2019	16	Pawel Hanus, Thomas Rush, Ari Sippola, Wes Peirce, Bill McCarty, Suvabrata Biswas	22	Dustin Stout, Xiao-Yan Gong, Harvey Jaffe, Kenny Pan
2020	Cancelled			
2021	6	Rick Bingham, Ryan Connors, Tom Peters, Ernie Schuler, Adam Kind, Will Colmer	24	Stefano Merlo, Robert Forster, Christopher Moh, Jordan Lampe
2022	12	Xingyu Zhang, Yanping Zhang, Henry Zhang, Ching-Po Wang	22	Lei Tsui, Yongdong Yang, Enhao Du, Wen Zhou, Andrew Rowberg, Danning Lu
2023	7	Wufeng Luo, Xiaoyuan Niu, Jia Mi, Bing Tong, Yi Xiong	3	Lawrence Gordon, Sean Casey, Jason Tokuda, Steven Siegel
2024	16	Jessie Lee, Mark Pan, Jin Chu, Kalyan Venkat	21	Rajan Jeyakumar, Terry Kellerman, Eugene Sor, Marcus Ballinger
2025	6	Rick Bingham, Mel Yudkin, Alan Munro, Colin Schloss	22	Dan Oakes, Harvey Jaffe, Alan Wood, Marc Franklin

Grand National Teams finalists, Flight C
Year	Dist	Winners	Dist	Runners-up
1991		Bob Fashingbauer, Kenneth Wolf, Thomas Dressing, David Marker		Albert Tom, Dennis Erani, Valentin Carciu, ???????
1992		Richard Unger, Charles Morrin, Andrew Ware, Martin Wewerka		J. Michael Hill, Kevin Kadmus, Carol Wisemiller, Marty Lobdale
1993		Stephen Arshan, Richard Ross, Feng Liu, Steve Pessin, George Shamy		Sardarsink Gohel, Jack Shartsis, Joyce Bell, Nathan Banker
1994		Jiabin Luo, Anil Kaushal, Sundar Atre, Zheng Zhang		Greg Bieber, Art Steinberg, Roman Shapiro, Betsy Wellington
1995	21	Nathaniel Thurston, Bill Chen, David Shao, Andrew Lewis	20	Jeff Jacob, Judi Hager, David Rosenstein, Yiping Wang
1996	25	Mark Edeburn, Susan Ostrowski, Dan Berlowitz, Joseph Seo		Mark DeGarcia, Marcus Rodhouse, Steven Erickson, Sheng-Hung Wang
1997		Tim Barrett, Joe Grue, Joe Barrett, Chengwei Lee, Tom Monikowski		Curtis Ruder, Atul Rai, Dennis Affholter, Jonathan Davidson
1998		Jerzy Jelen, Marek Dalecki, Ted Ryll, Romuald Mindak, Wieslaw Kalita, Zbigniew Muszynski		Ed Williams, Kurt Dasher, Thomas Reband, Bill Gliesman
1999		Dave Hemmer, Jon Kurasch, Robert Alps, Roger Solomon		Bruce Scott, Tom Allen, Paul Hazzard, Jim Boardman
2000		Zbigniew Musznyski, Marian Kowalewski, Pavel Boruta, Robert Boruta, Michael Omielski, Eugenisz Babiarz	25	Barry Margolin, Suresh Adina, Leo Zelevinsky, Otis Bricker
	From 2001 "C" is the lowest of four flights rather than three, but with little change in definition.			
2001		Mark MacKenzie, Ron Sloan, Deen Hergott, David Gordon		David Ruppert, Michael Pearlman, Dan Moore, Walter Mitnick
2002	21	Stephen Tu, Steve Chen, Shih-Ming Shih, Paul Cornelius, Rajeev Gupta	20	Rohan Coelho, Todd Zimnoch, Ralph Henderson, Maurice Henderson
2003	20	Rohan Coelho, Ralph Henderson, Danny McGurl, David Castles	13	Tadeusz Szych, Jerzy Jelen, Wlodzimierz Lopalewski, Klaudsiusz Warbinski, Mike Potoczak, Lech Brzozowski
2004	12	Grigoriy Blekherman, Amy Kiefer, David Harty, Han Peters	24	Ryan Connors, Mark Dean, Daniel Wilderman, Helena McGahagan
2005	2	Bob Defreyne, Milt Payne, Paul Beischlag, Reginald Smith	14	Andy Caranicas, Jeremy Martin, Daniel Barrett, Shela Kim
2006	19	Kam Tang, Samuel Lai, Tao Feng, Jack Lee	20	Ivan Jen, Veronica Mathis, John Cissel, Daniel Rothwell
2007	16	George Keiller, Don Morgan, John Heath, Alan Dennis	19	Long Xie, Roy Li, Kai Zhou, Baixiang Liu
2008	8	Thomas O'Reilly-Pol, Debbie Romero, Jonathan Goldberg, Sandy Bigg	23	Lenard Lakofka, Alan Flower, Kevin Lane, Aaron Craig
2009	12	Brian Wyman, Benjamin Weiss, Max Glick, Zachary Scherr, Zachary Wasserman	16	Brett Elliott, Harry Elliott, Robert Reichek, Byron Elliott, Herbert Kalman
2010	11	Ryan Schultz, David Camillus, Ambrish Bansal, Tom Terwilliger	20	Chris Poulos, Magid Shirzadegan, Anoush Shirzadegan, Brian Breckenridge
2011	2	Kaiyu Qian, Qian Ren, Fred Li, Yuan Chen, Hang Zhang, Wensong Zhen	13	Ping Hu, Meiheng Shi, Shengke Wang, Huixin Pan
2012	6	Alexander Prairie, Sylvia Shi, Hakan Berk, David Soukup	25	Daniel Jablonski, Emily Shen, Reid Barton, Vincent Fish
2013	23	Frederick Upton, Om Chokriwala, Yichi Zhang, Jack Chang, Nolan Chang	5	Huei Rong Chern, Sue Lan Ma, Manju Ceylony, Shakeel Ahmad
2014	21	Samuel Kuang, Kendrick Chow, Tsao-Tung Tsai, Luen-Jyh Luo	23	Nolan Chang, Jack Chang, Nima Badizadegan, Eric Chenteh Tang, Frederick Upton
2015	22	Winston Chang, Joe Albert Garcia, Ninad More, Nitin More, Kenny Pan	6	Shiang Chen, Adam Gann, Myron Goldstein, Terry Klein, Blake Schwartzbach
2016	21	Chin Huang, Min-Xiang Li, Donghui Lu, Michael Yang, Chun Chang, Frank Xie	22	Winston Chang, Wayne Gorski, Neil Nobua Agora, Kenny Pan, Joe Albert Garcia
2017	21	Max Schireson, Cadir Lee, Aravind Alwan, Olivier Chapelle, Michael Hu, Arthur Zhou	2	Li Zhang Yang, Ronald Baeker, William Ju, Roy Song, Jake Liu, Tong Chen
2018	23	Yukai Song, Yueqiang Xue, Sophia Chang, Lucy Zhang, Zu Ming Cheng	19	Jordan Tessarolo, Marc Furnemont, Janice Soutar, Ryley Breidda
2019	21	Qucheng (Roger) Gong, Jakob Karstens, Andrew Sinclair, Chris Chen	21	Michael Xu, Brandon Ge, Jonathan Yue, Wesley May, Aravind Alwan
2020	Cancelled			
2021	24	Hengrui Xing, Tingran Wang, Jiaheng Hu, Yang Xu	13	Henry Shi, Li Miao, Zhiqiang Hu, Zhijing Tang
2022	7	Xiaoyuan Niu, Jia Mi, Wufeng Luo, Terry Wu, Mingqiang Bao	13	La Verne Swiggum, William Omdahl, Terry Burk, David Hill
2023	24	Jack Boge, Avery Silverstein, Yanlai Yang, Jingyang Ng, Jessica Udomsrirungruang	24	Kenneth Mandel, Andrew Jeanguenat, Jack Latta, Maya Jonas-Silver
2024	13	Alec Sun, Avery Wang, Max Krawczyk, Yujian Zhou	21	Kai Eckert, Wesley May, Richard Ross, Ryan Gossiaux
2025	13	Ben Fisk, Rahul Garga, Ranmit Pantle, Manmit Pantle	24	Music Li, Hengrui Xing, Yuchen Xu, Yang Xu

== See also ==
- North American Pairs — the annual grass-roots event for pairs of two players
