= Jerry Helms =

American bridge player

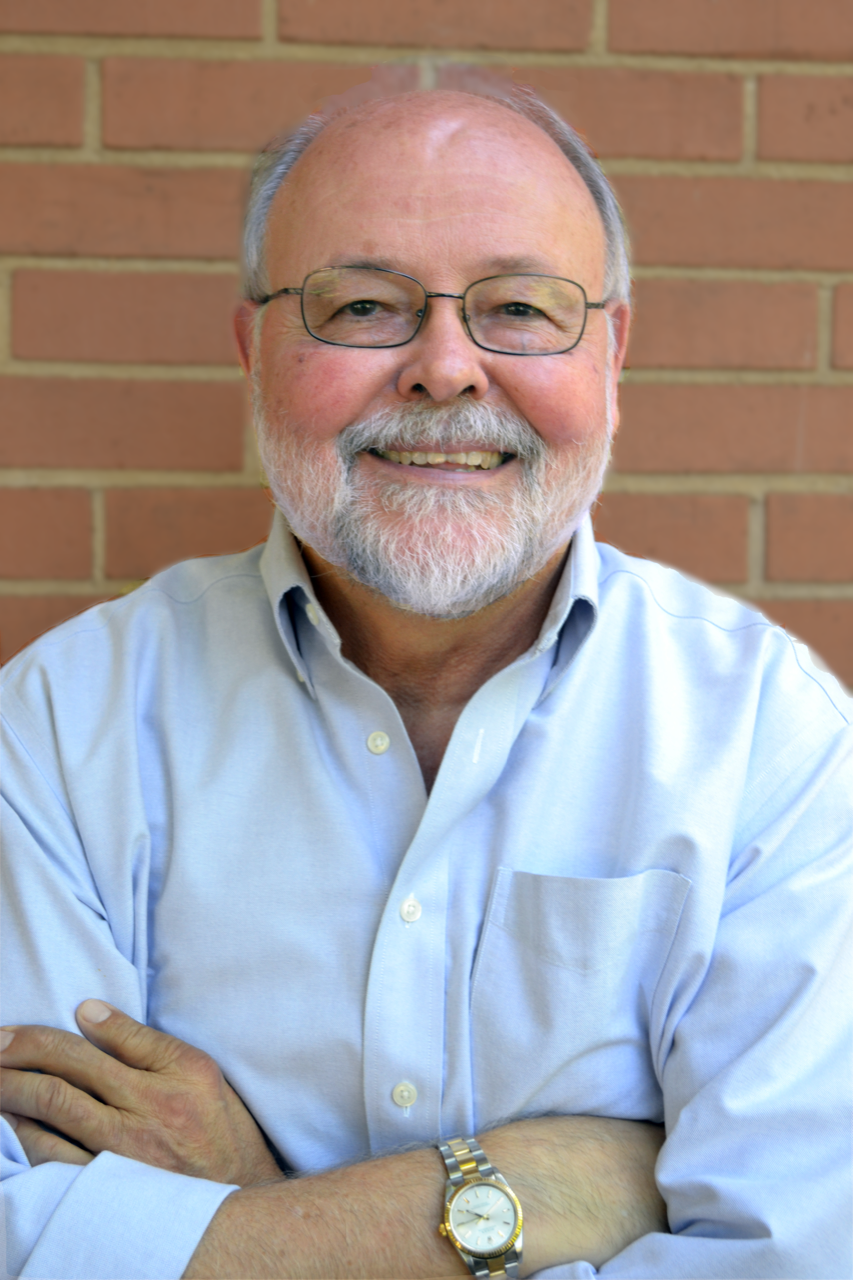

Jerry Helms is an American North American champion bridge player and an American Contract Bridge League (ACBL) Grand Life Master.

== Bridge accomplishments ==
=== Wins ===
- North American Bridge Championships (1)
  - Grand National Teams (1) 2022
