= Peter Boyd =

American bridge player (born 1950)

Peter Boyd (born 1950) is a world champion American bridge player. He has won one world championship, finished second in another, and won 17 North American bridge championships.

Boyd was born in Washington, DC and still lives there. He graduated from Harvard. He is a retired computer programmer.

== Bridge accomplishments ==
=== Awards ===
- Mott-Smith Trophy (1) 1987

=== Wins ===
- Rosenblum Cup (1) 1986
- North American Bridge Championships (17)
  - Lebhar IMP Pairs (1) 2001
  - North American Pairs (3) 1985, 2016, 2017
  - Grand National Teams (3) 1984, 1988, 1992
  - Jacoby Open Swiss Teams (2) 1986, 2012
  - Vanderbilt (3) 1987, 1991, 1997
  - Senior Knockout Teams (1) 2012
  - Keohane North American Swiss Teams (1) 2013
  - Mitchell Board-a-Match Teams (2) 1989, 1994
  - Reisinger (1) 1986

=== Runners-up ===
- d'Orsi Senior Bowl (1) 2011
- North American Bridge Championships
  - von Zedtwitz Life Master Pairs (1) 1987
  - Lebhar IMP Pairs (1) 2004
  - Blue Ribbon Pairs (1) 1982
  - Nail Life Master Open Pairs (1) 1988
  - Grand National Teams (2) 1985, 2011
  - Vanderbilt (2) 1992, 1999
  - Spingold (1) 1992
