= Rose Meltzer =

American bridge player

Rose Meltzer is an American bridge player. After completion of 2014 tournaments she was the only woman among 84 living Open World Grand Masters and she ranked 58th among them by World Bridge Federation (WBF) open masterpoints.

For the 1999 to 2007 cycles of world bridge competition, Meltzer led professional teams that won two major open team world championships: the biennial Bermuda Bowl in 2001, representing the United States as USA2, and the quadrennial Rosenblum Cup in 2006. (Kyle Larsen was her partner in both tournaments.) In both 2005 and 2007 she was one of six players on USA senior teams that won the Senior Bowl, a tournament for older players that is contested alongside the Bermuda Bowl (open) and Venice Cup (women).

== Bridge accomplishments ==
=== Awards ===
- Fishbein Trophy (1) 2000

=== Wins ===
- Bermuda Bowl (1) 2001
- North American Bridge Championships (6)
  - Grand National Teams (1) 2003
  - Senior Knockout Teams (1) 2011
  - Keohane North American Swiss Teams (1) 2013
  - Mitchell Board-a-Match Teams (1) 2001
  - Chicago Mixed Board-a-Match (1) 2001
  - Spingold (1) 2000

=== Runners-up ===
- North American Bridge Championships
  - Grand National Teams (2) 2000, 2001
  - Jacoby Open Swiss Teams (1) 2000
  - Chicago Mixed Board-a-Match (1) 2004
  - Spingold (3) 2003, 2009, 2010
