= Carolyn Lynch =

American philanthropist and bridge player

- Born: Carolyn Ann Hoff; August 26, 1946; Philadelphia, Pennsylvania
- Died: October 1, 2015 (aged 69)
- Education: University of Pennsylvania
- Occupation: Philanthropist
- Spouse: Peter Lynch

Carolyn Hoff Lynch (née Carolyn Ann Hoff; August 26, 1946 – October 1, 2015) was an American philanthropist and contract bridge multi-national and gold medal world champion.

== Philanthropy ==
Lynch, along with her husband Peter, co-founded the Lynch Foundation in 1988, and served as its chairman and president. The Lynch Foundation, valued at $125 million, gave away $8 million in 2013 and has made $80 million in grants since its inception. The Foundation supports education, religious organizations, cultural and historic organizations, hospitals, and medical research.

The Lynches give money primarily in five ways: as individuals, through the Lynch Foundation, through a Fidelity Charitable Gift Fund, and through two charitable trusts.

The Lynches have made gifts as individuals, donating $10 million to Peter Lynch's alma mater, Boston College, naming the School of Education after the family.

== Bridge accomplishments ==
Lynch was a Grand Life Master in the American Contract Bridge League and was a five-time national and a gold medal world champion.

=== Wins ===
- Keohane North American Swiss Teams (3) 2008, 2009, 2014
- Baze Senior Knockout Teams (1) 2009
- Roth Open Swiss Teams (1) 2013
- d’Orsi Senior Trophy (1) 2013

=== Runners-up ===
- Keohane North American Swiss Teams (1) 2006
- Roth Open Swiss Teams (1) 2012
- Baze Senior Knockout Teams (2) 2013, 2014

== Personal life ==
Carolyn married Peter Lynch on May 11, 1968 and they moved to Marblehead, Massachusetts, in 1970. Together, they raised three daughters: Mary, Annie, and Elizabeth. Carolyn died at age 69 in October 2015, from complications of leukemia. The Nova documentary episode "Black hole apocalypse" (2018) that aired on January 10, 2018 was dedicated in her memory.
