= Dan Morse (bridge) =

American bridge player (1938–2023)

Dan Morse (February 23, 1938 – March 21, 2023) was an American bridge player from Houston, Texas.

Morse died from complications of surgery on March 21, 2023.

== Bridge accomplishments ==
=== Awards ===
- Herman Trophy (1) 2002

=== Wins ===
- North American Bridge Championships (12)
  - von Zedtwitz Life Master Pairs (1) 1993
  - Rockwell Mixed Pairs (1) 1964
  - Grand National Teams (1) 1977
  - Jacoby Open Swiss Teams (1) 2011
  - Truscott Senior Swiss Teams (1) 2013
  - Vanderbilt (2) 1990, 1993
  - Senior Knockout Teams (3) 1994, 2002, 2003
  - Reisinger (1) 2002
  - Spingold (1) 1977

=== Runners-up ===
- North American Bridge Championships (10)
  - von Zedtwitz Life Master Pairs (1) 1979
  - Blue Ribbon Pairs (1) 1980
  - North American Pairs (1) 1989
  - Jacoby Open Swiss Teams (1) 1991
  - Vanderbilt (1) 1985
  - Senior Knockout Teams (2) 2007, 2010
  - Keohane North American Swiss Teams (2) 1996, 2005
  - Spingold (1) 1967
