= Mike Passell =

American bridge player (born 1947)

Michael Passell (born 1947) is a professional American bridge player from Dallas, Texas.

Passell was inducted into the ACBL Hall of Fame in 2008.

== Bridge accomplishments ==
=== Honors ===
- ACBL Hall of Fame, 2008

=== Awards ===
- Fishbein Trophy (2) 1978, 2016
- Mott-Smith Trophy (2) 1978, 1983

=== Wins ===
- Bermuda Bowl (1) 1979
- d'Orsi Senior Bowl (1) 2013
- World Transnational Open Teams Championship (1) 2001
- North American Bridge Championships (27)
  - Lebhar IMP Pairs (1) 1988
  - Silodor Open Pairs (3) 1978, 1983, 1999
  - Grand National Teams (1) 1981
  - Jacoby Open Swiss Teams (2) 1991, 1996
  - Roth Open Swiss Teams (2) 2013, 2016
  - Vanderbilt (2) 1978, 1982
  - Senior Knockout Teams (2) 2009, 2017
  - Keohane North American Swiss Teams (3) 2008, 2009 ,2014
  - Mitchell Board-a-Match Teams (3) 1986, 1988, 1993
  - Reisinger (4) 1976, 1988, 1992, 2003
  - Spingold (3) 1978, 1986, 1989
  - Von Zedtwitz Life Master Pairs (1) 2016

=== Runners-up ===
- Bermuda Bowl (1) 1977
- North American Bridge Championships
  - von Zedtwitz Life Master Pairs (1) 1976
  - Rockwell Mixed Pairs (1) 1982
  - Wernher Open Pairs (1) 1983
  - Grand National Teams (2) 1998, 2004
  - Jacoby Open Swiss Teams (1) 2003
  - Roth Open Swiss Teams (2) 2012, 2017
  - Vanderbilt (3) 1976, 1997, 1998
  - Senior Knockout Teams (3) 2013, 2014, 2015
  - Keohane North American Swiss Teams (1) 2006
  - Mitchell Board-a-Match Teams (1) 1995
  - Chicago Mixed Board-a-Match (1) 1996
  - Reisinger (5) 1980, 1990, 1993, 1994, 1996
  - Spingold (2) 1994, 1997

== 2015 Palmetto Regional incident ==
In November 2015, the ACBL Appeals and Charges committee upheld a finding by the Ethical Oversight Committee that, during the 2015 Palmetto Regional, Passell had violated sections 3.1, 3.7, and 3.20 of the ACBL's Code of Disciplinary Regulations. According to a joint statement by the ACBL and Passell, Passell admitted to fouling a board at the 2015 Palmetto Regional and failing to call the tournament director. Passell was suspended for 14 days starting December 20, 2015, and forfeited the 15.40 masterpoints earned at the event.
