= Gary Cohler =

American bridge player

Gary Cohler is an American bridge player.

== Bridge accomplishments ==
=== Wins ===
- North American Bridge Championships (8)
  - Freeman Mixed Board-a-Match (1) 2010
  - Grand National Teams (5) 1995, 2004, 2011, 2012, 2013
  - Jacoby Open Swiss Teams (1) 2000
  - Reisinger (1) 2006

=== Runners-up ===
- North American Bridge Championships
  - von Zedtwitz Life Master Pairs (1) 2001
  - Lebhar IMP Pairs (1) 1998
  - Rockwell Mixed Pairs (1) 2002
  - North American Pairs (2) 1995, 1996
  - Grand National Teams (1) 2005
  - Reisinger (1) 2000
