= Hugh Ross (bridge player) =

Canadian-American bridge player

Hugh Lennox Ross (February 23, 1937 in Montreal – November 20, 2017 in Oakland, California) was a championship contract bridge player. Although a Canadian citizen, he played on American bridge teams.

Ross was born and raised in Montreal, Quebec, Canada and was a graduate of McGill University. Ross was inducted into the ACBL Hall of Fame in 2002.

== Bridge accomplishments ==
=== Honors ===
- ACBL Hall of Fame, 2002

=== Wins ===
- Bermuda Bowl (3) 1976, 1985, 1987
- North American Bridge Championships (19)
  - Nail Life Master Open Pairs (2) 1990, 1991
  - Grand National Teams (7) 1982, 1983, 1985, 1987, 1993, 1996, 2003
  - Jacoby Open Swiss Teams (1) 1995
  - Vanderbilt (2) 1984, 1987
  - Marcus Cup (1) 1963
  - Reisinger (6) 1968, 1974, 1975, 1981, 1985, 1986

=== Runners-up ===
- Bermuda Bowl (2) 1977, 1989
- Rosenblum Cup (1) 1982
- North American Bridge Championships
  - von Zedtwitz Life Master Pairs (1) 1992
  - North American Pairs (1) 1985
  - Grand National Teams (1) 2001
  - Jacoby Open Swiss Teams (1) 1994
  - Keohane North American Swiss Teams (1) 1996
  - Chicago Mixed Board-a-Match (1) 1986
  - Reisinger (2) 1966, 1983
