= Boris Baran =

Canadian bridge player

Boris Baran is a Canadian bridge player.

== Bridge accomplishments ==
=== Wins ===
- World Senior Teams Championship (1) 2002
- North American Bridge Championships (5)
  - North American Pairs (1) 1991
  - Keohane North American Swiss Teams (4) 1992, 1994, 1995, 2002

=== Runners-up ===
- Bermuda Bowl (1) 1995
- North American Bridge Championships (2)
  - North American Pairs (1) 1990
  - Keohane North American Swiss Teams (1) 1998
