= Richard Coren =

American bridge player (1954–2021)

Richard "Richie" Coren (11 August 1954 – 31 March 2021) was an American bridge player. He died in March 2021 from Crohn's disease.

== Bridge accomplishments ==
=== Wins ===
- North American Bridge Championships (6)
  - Reisinger (1) 2017
  - Norman Kay Platinum Pairs (1) 2014
  - Rockwell Mixed Pairs (1) 2014
  - Blue Ribbon Pairs (1) 2000
  - Grand National Teams (1) 2014
  - Keohane North American Swiss Teams (1) 2001

=== Runners-up ===
- North American Bridge Championships
  - Grand National Teams (1) 2017
