= North American Pairs =

Competitive event in Bridge

The North American Pairs (NAP) is a set of annual North American championships for pairs contested over two days at the spring American Contract Bridge League (ACBL) North American Bridge Championships (NABC). The events are restricted to pairs that have qualified through local, regional and district levels within their ACBL Districts.

Three fields or "Flights" compete on the same schedule:

Flight A, open to all players, is formally the Baldwin North American Pairs.
Flight B, restricted to players with 0 to 2500 masterpoints, is formally the Golder North American Pairs.
Flight C, restricted to players who have not yet become Life Masters and have fewer than 500 masterpoints, is formally the President's Cup North American Pairs.

Each competition is a four-session matchpoint pairs tournament with two qualifying sessions on the first day and two final sessions on the second.

== History ==
=== Flight A ===
Play for the Baldwin North American Pairs (Flight A) begins each summer at the local level and concludes at the North American Bridge Championships in the following Spring. Qualifiers at the club level advance to unit competition and those qualifiers advance to district finals. Three pairs from each district – more, depending upon attendance – qualify for the North American final.

At inauguration, the open pairs contest was named the Grand National Pairs with 61,000 starting pairs participating in the initial local stage in August 1978 - the ultimate winners arising from the 1979 Spring NABC. The contest was renamed the North American Pairs in deference to the participation of all country members of the ACBL.

Winners have their names inscribed on the Baldwin Trophy and also receive certificates of recognition. The trophy is presented in memory of Col. Russell J. Baldwin (1889–1969), a U.S. Army officer and expert on tournament procedure who was ACBL Honorary Member of the Year in 1943. Baldwin was active as an organizer from the earliest days of contract bridge. He became a director of the American Bridge League and its treasurer shortly after its founding in 1927. He was a member of the ACBL Laws Commission and was primarily responsible for the first Duplicate Code (Laws specifically for duplicate bridge) issued in 1935. Baldwin was active as a tournament director from 1927 until 1941. After service in World War II, he was ACBL business manager from 1946 until 1951. He was recalled to military service at the outbreak of the Korean War and retired from the U.S. Army in 1957. He rejoined ACBL in 1958 and was in charge of tournament scheduling until his retirement in 1963.

=== Flight B ===
Known as the Golder North American Pairs - Flight B, the first stage of the event is also conducted at the local club level with qualifiers advancing to unit competition. Those qualifiers then advance to the district finals where three pairs – more, depending upon attendance – qualify for the North American final. The inaugural event was held at the 1992 Spring NABC.

Winners have their names inscribed on the Golder Cup and will also receive a certificate of recognition. The trophy is presented in memory of Benjamin M. Golder (1894–1946) of Philadelphia, who died the day before the close of his term as 1946 ACBL president. He was named ACBL Honorary Member of the Year for 1947. His widow Peggy Golder, later Solomon, was an ACBL Hall of Fame player.

=== Flight C ===
Players in the North American Pairs - Flight C, compete for the President's Cup. The inaugural event was held at the 1987 Spring NABC.

The trophy was presented in 1942 by Morgan Howard, ACBL president that year. For many years it was awarded to the winners of the President's Pairs, a standalone event at the Summer NABC. As in the other two flights, Flight C competition begins each summer at the local club level and qualifiers advance to unit and district competitions with three pairs from each district – more, depending upon attendance – qualifying for the North American final.

== Winners ==
North American Pairs, Flight A
Year	District	Winners	Runners-up
1979	25	Arthur Moore, Eric Robinson	Steve Landen, Larry Mori
1980		Bob Feller, Jeffrey Hall	Larry N. Cohen, Ron Gerard
1981		Helen Blakey, Robert Blakey	Mark Feldman, Chip Martel
1982		Bill Nutting, Ivan Scope	Richard Pavlicek, Cliff Russell
1983		Jim Felts, John Griscom	Ron Gerard, Stephen Sanborn
1984	25	Steve Sion, Harold Stengel	Marty Bergen, Larry N. Cohen
1985	6	Peter Boyd, Steve Robinson	Peter Pender, Hugh Ross
1986		Drew Cannell, Ganesan Sekhar	Craig Cordes, Tom Daniel
1987		Jan Janitschke, Dick Reed	Judi Cody, Ron Sukoneck
1988	21	Chip Martel, Jan Martel	Mark Cohen, Stasha Cohen
1989	11	David Caslan, Dennis Clerkin	Dan Morse, Bobby Nail
1990		Sidney Lazard, Jack LaNoue	Mark Stein, Boris Baran
1991	1	Boris Baran, Mark Stein,	Steve Landen, Pratap Rajadhyaksha
1992		Jim Krekorian, Rick Zucker	2/3. Robert Crafton, Howard Weiner; 2/3. Joe Jabon, Harry Steiner
1993		James Griffin, Kenneth Schutze	Iftikhar Baqai, Mitch Dunitz
1994		James Griffin, Kenneth Schutze	Ralph Cohen, Reece Rogers
1995		David Berkowitz, Lisa Berkowitz	Gary Cohler, Jerry Goldfein
1996		Marshall Tuly, James Cunningham	Gary Cohler, Jerry Goldfein
1997		Aidan Ballantyne, Gordon McOrmond	JoAnna Stansby, Lew Stansby
1998	6	Bill Cole, Ron Sukoneck	James Cunningham, Marshall Tuly
1999		James Griffin, Kenneth Schutze	Tom Kniest, Karen Walker
2000		Kevin Collins, Patty Tucker	Victor King, John Stiefel
2001	25	Doug Doub, Frank Merblum	Ed Davis, Jill Meyers
2002	21	JoAnna Stansby, Lew Stansby	Joseph Godefrin, Ed Schulte
2003		Steve Landen, Michael Zerbini	Doug Doub, Franklin Merblum
2004		Henry Lortz, Wayne Ohlrich	Glenn Milgrim, Chris Willenken
2005	13	Nikolay Demirev, David Yang	Dan Jacob, Bryan Maksymetz
2006		Gordon Campbell, Piotr Klimowicz	Henry Lortz, Wayne Ohlrich
2007	6	Dave Abelow, Dick Wegman	Glenn Milgrim, Chris Willenken
2008	13	Xiaodong Shi, David Yang	Chuck Said, David Siebert
2009		Jim Krekorian, John Rengstorff	Bob Heitzman, Jonathan Weinstein
2010	25	Doug Doub, Frank Merblum	Michael Polowan, Jared Lilienstein
2011	24	Shane Blanchard, Joe Grue	Kevin Bathurst, Joel Wooldridge
2012	2	Jordan Cohen, Barry Senensky	Bill Pollack, Rozanne Pollack
2013	9	Kevin Dwyer, Gavin Wolpert	Jim Munday, Richard Oshlag
2014	10	Bryan Howard, Terry Spector	Doug Doub, Frank Merblum
2015	25	Mark Aquino, Shome Mukherjee	Jim Munday, Richard Oshlag
2016	6	Peter Boyd, Steve Robinson	Bart Bramley, Ira Hessel
2017	6	Peter Boyd, Steve Robinson	Michael Gill, Noble Shore
2018	25	Adam Grossack, Zachary Grossack	Joel Wooldridge, Kent Mignocchi
2019	9	Matthew Weingarten, Jeff Edelstein	Jim Munday, Larry Sealy
2020	Cancelled		
2021	2	Bob Todd, Douglas Fisher	Chris Compton, Venkatrao Koneru
2022	24	Joel Wooldridge, Kent Mignocchi	Alan Schwartz, Annie Schwartz
2023	25	Zachary Grossack, Linda Robinson	Louis Glasthal, Jay Apfelbaum
2024	3	Alex Allen, Abe Pineles	Joshua Donn, Sheri Winestock
2025	23	Mitch Dunitz, Iftikhar Baqai	Joel Wooldridge, Kent Mignocchi

North American Pairs, Flight B
Year	District	Winners	Runners-up
1992		Peter Worley, Kevin Young	Kathie Blumenthal, Patricia Goldfein
1993		Robert Sewell, Paul Janicki	Lawrence Gibbons, Gregory Jecker
1994		Brendan Dempsey, Ian Crowe	Jack Kilby, Ernest Lambertsen
1995		Jay Levy, William Rushmore	Bill Archambo, Richard Bender
1996		Robert Johnson, David Rosenstein	Daniel Levi, Samuel Ehrlichman
1997		Bill Drewett, Kirk Twiss	David Green, Donald Tofte
1998		Adam Beneschan, Brian Gilbert	Mark Burkhammer, Brian Zajac
1999		Andy Kaufman, Greg Burch	Patricia Griffin, Stephen Wood
2000	6	Hal Hindman, Mark Chen	Tien-Chun Yang, Fang Wu
2001	25	Walter Lee, Jonathan Weinstein	Mike Ralston, Mahesh Rathi
2002		Wieslaw Kalita, Marian Krasowski	Robert Stayman, Frank Sensoli
2003	23	Jordan Chodorow, Harvey Katz	Frank Sensoli, Michael Alioto
2004		Jim Alison, Dayn Beam	Jacqueline DeRouin, Jan Garthe
2005		Pete Whipple, Jamie Radcliffe	Joon Pahk, Samuel Ieong
2006	6	Fletcher Thompson, Bruce Todd	B. J. Trelford, Chris Buchanan
2007		Mark Golding, Rob Kitchen	Bijoy Anand, Earl Brown Jr.
2008	3	Sidney Kanter, Ron Nelken	Ron Fertig, Dayou Zhou
2009	25	Robert McCaw, Lewis Gamerman	Jon Brandon, Harley Bress
2010		Dian Petrov, Fred Schenker	John Kozero, Gary Robinson
2011		Philippe Galaski, Roger Webb	Brad Bartol, Matt Cory
2012	14	Joseph Rice, Bjorgvin Kristinsson	Jay Anderson, Michael Moulding
2013	16	Daniel Jackson, Bill McCarty	Weishu Wu, Xiao-Yan Gong
2014	2	Aleksandar Vujic, Miroslav Kovacevic	Wieslaw Kalita, Romuald Mindak
2015	7	Andrew Jeng, Richard Jeng	Kamal Gupta, Malik Magdon-Ismail
2016	11	Ryan Schultz, A.J. Stephani	Mike Ma, Steve Moese
2017	23	Murat Veysoglu, Kevin Lane	Bob Enenstein, Alan Wood
2018	16	Jeff Dater, Scott Nason	Kamal Gupta, Malik Magdon-Ismail
2019	25	Yin Yichen, Chang Liu	Mark Golding, Robert Kitchen
2020	Cancelled		
2021	19	John Lai, Morris Chen	Matthew Morse, Howard Huynh
2022	6	Rick Bingham, Ryan Connors	Marc Franklin, Harvey Jaffe
2023	16	James Zhan, Ying Peng	Jean La Traverse, Stephane Turcotte
2024	6	Alan Munro, Colin Schloss	Weican Xiao, Haihong Li
2025	16	Charlie Chen, Andrew Chen	Peng Cheng, Henry Zhang

North American Pairs, Flight C
Year	District	Winners	Runners-up
1987		1/2. Leo Austern, Bernard Pollack; 1/2. David Deaderick, Bill Thomas	
1988		Brad Moss, Aaron Silverstein	Geoffrey O'Connor, Charles Bilick
1989		Warren King, Jeffrey Brown	Sylvian Descoteauz, Guy Belisle
1990		Philip Leung, Moske Harel	Deborah Hart, Nate Ward
1991		Eric Greco, Philip Greco	Bruce Graff, Steve Castellino
1992		Gail Joelson, Alan Kasner	J. Greg Fowler, Don Herring
1993	21	Mark Michele, Everett Boyer	Gabrida Rabiega, Leszek Rabiega
1994		Weizhong Bao, Jingdong Guo	Duane Tilden, Grace Jeklin
1995	21	Edward Lee, Brett Roby	Philip Feng Lu, Xiaodong Zhang
1996		Yue Zuo, Ruoyu Fan	Carlos Bichara, Rita Bichara
1997	21	Thomas Franklin, Michael Corker	Weiming Hu, Alex Lo
1998	21	Tien-Chun Yang, Fang Wu	Matt Just, Paul Coulter
1999		James Gunn, Harry Shaffer	Norman Cannon, Judith Hallowell
2000		Meredith Beck, John Johnson	Rachel Chittaro, Edward Nield
2001	6	Hailong Ao, Jian-Jian Wang	David Pettit, Doris Suojanen
2002		Jacek Leznicki, Jerry Owczarek	Kevin Jones, Daniel Kenney
2003	6	John Christensen, Robert Wissman	Lester Gottlieb, Richard Avazian
2004	24	Daniel Wilderman, Ryan Connors	Jacek Leznicki, Jerry Owczarek
2005	21	Jiang Chen, Nongyu Li	Inger Lise Blount, Jeanette Hughes
2006	13	Stanislaw Kolesnik, Vladimir Reznik	Mike Develin, John Barth
2007	22	Jon King, Dayou Zhou	Chong Zhao, Narayanan Ramabhadran
2008	9	Abraham Pallas, Dimitri Bourilkov	Kaiyu Qian, Jiawei Luo
2009	21	Michael Bodell, Elenalani Lam	Alex Lovejoy, Argenta Price
2010		Vladimir Oudalov, Stanley Weiss	Lisa Kuo, Murat Veysoglu
2011	15	Rajeev Bansal, Michael Hughes	Guillaume de Decker, Ajit Thyagarajan
2012	5	Jeffrey Tsang, Chase Bonnette	Reid Barton, Emily Shen
2013	12	Julie Arbit, Jordan Kaye	Reid Barton, Emily Shen
2014	9	Sharlene Tyler, Donald Richards	Luen-Jyh Luo, Tsao-Tung Tsai
2015	6	Adam Gann, Blake Schwartzbach	Xiyuan Ge, Benjamin Kompa
2016	7	Benjamin Kompa, Robert Thorstad	James Herchenroeder, Laurie Herchenroeder
2017	12	Yanping Zhang, Henry Zhang	John Hindle, Jeff Gosman
2018	12	Yanping Zhang, Henry Zhang	Roger Thomas, Jon Gassaway
2019	9	Sheila Cesarano, Terry Jonas	Ilgaz Ciftci, Arda Kabaca
2020	Cancelled		
2021	16	Arvind Sharma, Lynnie Sharma	Olivia Schireson, Brian Zhang
2022	22	Danning Lu, Andrew Rowberg	James Yi, Tengyun Tony Cao
2023	22	Bill Shane, Hongsa Situ	James Yi, Tengyun Tony Cao
2024	24	Yuchen Xu, Music Li	Ryan Fu, Kyle Blocher
2025	12	Tengyun Tony Cao, James Yi	Manmit Pantle, Ranmit Pantle
2026	6	Hamilton Sawczuk, Luke Brezak	Prakash Malkani, Shriram Phadke

== See also ==
- Grand National Teams
