= Dennis Clerkin =

American bridge player

Dennis E. Clerkin (born 1950) is a professional American bridge player. Clerkin is from Bloomington, Indiana.

== Bridge accomplishments ==
=== Wins ===
- North American Bridge Championships (6)
  - North American Pairs (1) 1989
  - Grand National Teams (2) 1990, 2010
  - Senior Knockout Teams (1) 2007
  - Keohane North American Swiss Teams (1) 2010
  - Chicago Mixed Board-a-Match (1) 1992

=== Runners-up ===
- North American Bridge Championships
  - Jacoby Open Swiss Teams (1) 2008
  - Keohane North American Swiss Teams (1) 1977
