= Sam Marks =

American bridge player

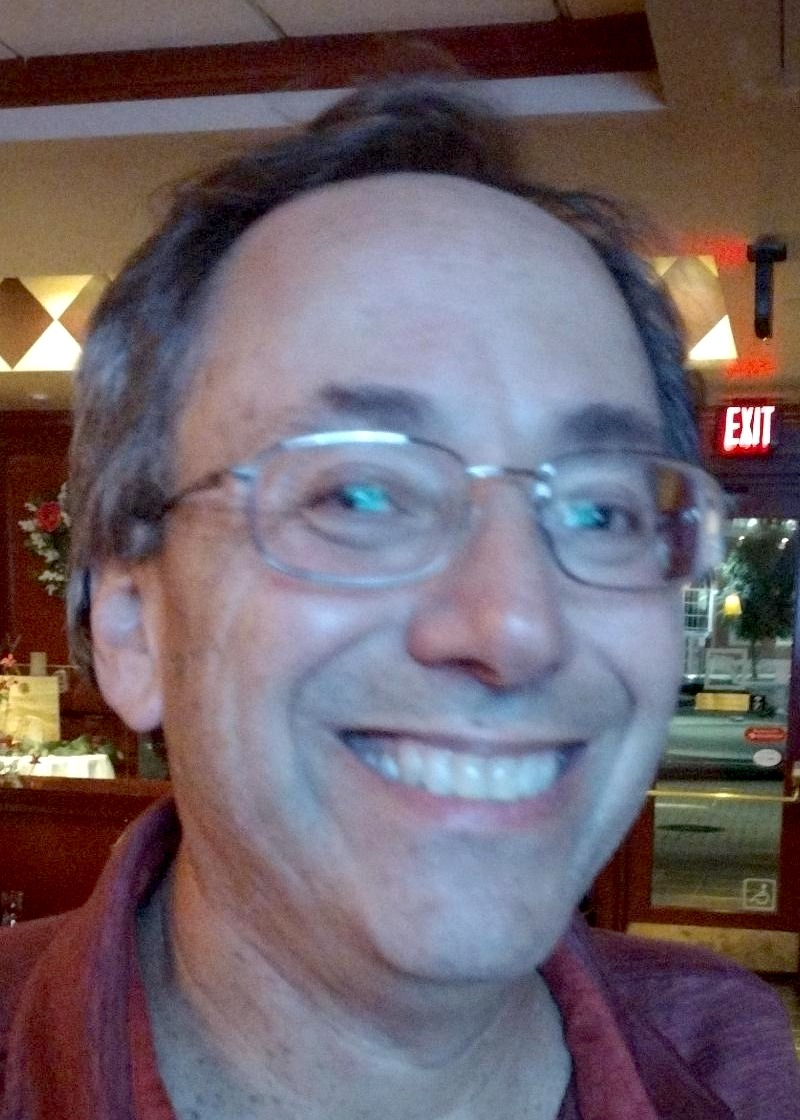
- Sam Marks after winning 2022 GNT

Sam Marks is an American North American champion bridge player and an American Contract Bridge League (ACBL) Grand Life Master.

== Bridge accomplishments ==
=== Wins ===
- North American Bridge Championships (1)
  - Grand National Teams (1) 2022

=== Runners-up ===
- North American Bridge Championships (1)
  - Wernher Open Pairs (1) 2005

== Personal life ==
Sam lives in Atlanta with his wife, Lisa. Sam owns and runs the Bridge Club of Atlanta.
