= Larry Mori =

American bridge player

Lawrence K. "Larry" Mori (1948–2022) was a professional American bridge player from Charlton, New York. Mori was raised in Tokyo. He was a licensed psychotherapist, educated at Wayne State University and University of Michigan.

== Bridge accomplishments ==
=== Wins ===
- North American Bridge Championships (5)
  - Rockwell Mixed Pairs (1) 1992
  - Silodor Open Pairs (1) 1991
  - Keohane North American Swiss Teams (3) 1990, 2004, 2007

=== Runners-up ===
- North American Bridge Championships
  - North American Pairs (1) 1979
  - Chicago Mixed Board-a-Match (1) 1997
