= Steve Landen =

American bridge player

Stephen W. "Steve" Landen (1952 – November 2017) was a professional American bridge player from West Bloomfield, Michigan. He was a computer consultant and graduated from University of Michigan.

== Bridge accomplishments ==
=== Wins ===
- North American Bridge Championships (6)
  - Silodor Open Pairs (1) 2010
  - Wernher Open Pairs (2) 1990, 2000
  - Blue Ribbon Pairs (1) 2007
  - North American Pairs (1) 2003
  - Reisinger (1) 2002

=== Runners-up ===
- North American Bridge Championships
  - Blue Ribbon Pairs (1) 2001
  - North American Pairs (2) 1979, 1991
  - Grand National Teams (2) 1982, 2011
  - Senior Knockout Teams (1) 2010
  - Roth Open Swiss Teams (1) 2005
