= Lew Stansby =

American bridge player (1940–2024)

Lew Stansby (August 17, 1940 – May 24, 2024) was an American bridge player from Dublin, California. At the time of his death Lew, a former commodities trader, lived with wife and fellow national champion JoAnna Stansby. Since his first national win in the Reisinger in 1965, he won over 35 national championships and seven world championships, with a win in every decade since 1965. Lew's most successful partnership was with Chip Martel, whom he played with from 1977-2012 and with whom he won his world championships in the Bermuda Bowl, Rosenblum Teams, and World Open Pairs.

Stansby was inducted into the ACBL Hall of Fame in 2001. He died on May 24, 2024, at the age of 83.

== Bridge accomplishments ==
=== Honors ===
- ACBL Hall of Fame, 2001

=== Awards ===
- Fishbein Trophy (1) 2000
- Herman Trophy (1) 2007
- Mott-Smith Trophy (2) 1984, 1986

=== Wins ===
- Bermuda Bowl (3) 1985, 1987, 2001
- d'Orsi Senior Bowl (2) 2005, 2007
- Rosenblum Cup (1) 1994
- World Open Pairs Championship (1) 1982
- North American Bridge Championships (35)
  - Silodor Open Pairs (1) 1986
  - Nail Life Master Open Pairs (1) 1998
  - North American Pairs (1) 2002
  - Freeman Mixed Board-a-Match (1) 2010
  - Grand National Teams (7) 1982, 1983, 1985, 1987, 1993, 1996, 2003
  - Roth Open Swiss Teams (2) 2010, 2013
  - Vanderbilt (7) 1967, 1984, 1987, 1994, 1996, 1998, 2011
  - Senior Knockout Teams (1) 2013
  - Mitchell Board-a-Match Teams (4) 1995, 2001, 2005, 2007
  - Chicago Mixed Board-a-Match (2) 2001, 2008
  - Reisinger (5) 1965, 1981, 1985, 1986, 1996
  - Spingold (3) 1975, 1990, 2000

=== Runners-up ===
- Bermuda Bowl (1) 1989
- Rosenblum Cup (1) 1982
- North American Bridge Championships (24)
  - Wernher Open Pairs (1) 1991
  - Blue Ribbon Pairs (1) 1981
  - Nail Life Master Open Pairs (1) 1999
  - North American Pairs (1) 1997
  - Grand National Teams (3) 2000, 2001, 2006
  - Jacoby Open Swiss Teams (1) 2000
  - Vanderbilt (3) 1992, 2006, 2010
  - Senior Knockout Teams (1) 2012
  - Mitchell Board-a-Match Teams (3) 1989, 1994, 2008
  - Chicago Mixed Board-a-Match (1) 2004
  - Reisinger (4) 1983, 2006, 2007, 2012
  - Spingold (4) 1992, 1993, 1995, 2003
