= Sylvia Shi =

American bridge player

Sylvia Shi (born July 24, 1988) is an American multi national champion and world champion in duplicate bridge.

== Career ==
Shi started playing bridge in 2011 when she picked it up over learning to fly planes as a much-needed new hobby after a break-up. While she is well-versed in many systems, she has a fondness for playing TOSR (transfer-oriented systemic relay), a form of Precision Club. Shi became a Grand Life Master in December 2019 at the San Francisco NABC.

Shi admitted to cheating at online bridge through self-kibitzing and was suspended by the American Contract Bridge League from July 2020 to July 2023. She is now on probation with the ACBL through 2026.

== Bridge accomplishments ==
=== Wins ===
- Grand National Teams Flight C 2012, Flight A 2016
- Lebhar IMP Pairs 2015
- NABC+ Mixed Swiss Teams 2015
- Sternberg Women's Board-a-Match Teams 2016
- 10K Mixed Swiss Teams 2016
- Torlontano Trophy 2016
- Smith Life Master Women's Pairs 2017

=== Runners-up ===
- Edgar Kaplan Blue Ribbon Pairs 2017
- Grand National Teams 2018
