= Gerald Caravelli =

American bridge player

Gerald A. Caravelli (July 25, 1943 – February 29, 2012) was an American bridge player. He was from Des Plaines, Illinois and was an accountant.

== Bridge accomplishments ==
=== Wins ===
- North American Bridge Championships (7)
  - Rockwell Mixed Pairs (1) 1974
  - Silodor Open Pairs (1) 1982
  - Wernher Open Pairs (1) 1976
  - Grand National Teams (2) 1978, 1995
  - Keohane North American Swiss Teams (1) 1996
  - Chicago Mixed Board-a-Match (1) 1975

=== Runners-up ===
- North American Bridge Championships
  - Leventritt Silver Ribbon Pairs (3) 1999, 2000, 2001
  - Silodor Open Pairs (1) 1984
  - Grand National Teams (2) 1984, 1988
  - Vanderbilt (1) 1977
  - Keohane North American Swiss Teams (3) 1979, 1988, 1989
  - Mitchell Board-a-Match Teams (1) 1971
  - Chicago Mixed Board-a-Match (1) 1980
