= Joe Grue =

American bridge player

Joe Grue is a professional American bridge player.

== List of bridge accomplishments ==
=== Wins ===
- Bermuda Bowl (1) 2017
- North American Bridge Championships (7)
  - Blue Ribbons (3) 2015, 2017, 2018
  - North American Pairs (1) 2011
  - Keohane North American Swiss Teams (1) 2008
  - Reisinger (1) 2006
  - Vanderbilt (3) 2012, 2018, 2023
  - Spingold (1) 2016
- Buffett Cup (1) 2012

=== Runners-up ===
- Bermuda Bowl (1) 2011
- North American Bridge Championships (3)
  - Grand National Teams (1) 2009
  - Spingold (1) 2013
  - Vanderbilt (1) 2011
