= Chip Martel =

American bridge player

Charles U. "Chip" Martel (born 1953) is an American computer scientist and bridge player.

Martel was Inducted into the ACBL Hall of Fame in 2014. He is married to Jan Martel, also in the ACBL Hall of Fame.

== Academic life ==
Martel received a B.S. degree from Massachusetts Institute of Technology in 1975, and a Ph.D. from UC Berkeley in 1980. He helped establish the computer science department at UC Davis, received tenure there in 1985–86, and retired in 2013. At UC Davis he is Charles U. Martel, professor emeritus. His academic interests involved designing and analyzing algorithms.

== Bridge accomplishments ==
=== Awards and honors ===
- Herman Trophy (1) 1981
- Mott-Smith Trophy (1) 1994
- Fishbein Trophy (1) 2000
- ACBL Hall of Fame, 2014

=== Wins ===
- Bermuda Bowl (4) 1985, 1987, 2001, 2017
- World Open Pairs Championship (1) 1982
- Rosenblum Cup (2) 1994, 2026
- World Senior Teams (1) 2016
- North American Bridge Championships (38)
  - von Zedtwitz Life Master Pairs (1) 2007
  - Nail Life Master Open Pairs (1) 2012
  - North American Pairs (1) 1988
  - Grand National Teams (9) 1982, 1983, 1985, 1987, 1993, 1996, 2003, 2009, 2017
  - Jacoby Open Swiss Teams (1) 1994
  - Roth Open Swiss Teams (1) 2010
  - Vanderbilt (8) 1984, 1987, 1994, 1996, 1998, 2011, 2018, 2025
  - Mitchell Board-a-Match Teams (5) 1995, 2001, 2005, 2007, 2018
  - Chicago Mixed Board-a-Match (1) 2001
  - Reisinger (4) 1981, 1985, 1986, 1996
  - Spingold (5) 1990, 2000, 2016, 2023, 2026
  - Soloway (1) 2024

=== Runners-up ===
- Bermuda Bowl (1) 1989
- Rosenblum Cup (1) 1982
- North American Bridge Championships
  - Blue Ribbon Pairs (1) 1981
  - North American Pairs (1) 1981
  - Grand National Teams (5) 2000, 2001, 2006, 2014, 2016
  - Jacoby Open Swiss Teams (2) 2000, 2014
  - Roth Open Swiss Teams (1) 2013
  - Vanderbilt (3) 1992, 2006, 2010, 2026
  - Mitchell Board-a-Match Teams (1) 2008
  - Chicago Mixed Board-a-Match (1) 2004
  - Reisinger (3) 1983, 2006, 2007
  - Spingold (4) 1992, 1993, 1995, 2003
