= Gaylor Kasle =

American bridge player

Gaylor L. Kasle (born 1941 died 2022) was a professional American bridge player from Tucson, Arizona and Boca Raton, Florida.

== Bridge accomplishments ==
=== Wins ===
- North American Bridge Championships (10)
  - Leventritt Silver Ribbon Pairs (1) 2006
  - Wernher Open Pairs (1) 1993
  - Jacoby Open Swiss Teams (1) 2012
  - Vanderbilt (1) 1994
  - Senior Knockout Teams (1) 2012
  - Keohane North American Swiss Teams (3) 1982, 1985, 1990
  - Mitchell Board-a-Match Teams (1) 1973
  - Chicago Mixed Board-a-Match (1) 1996

=== Runners-up ===
- North American Bridge Championships
  - Leventritt Silver Ribbon Pairs (2) 2008, 2009
  - Blue Ribbon Pairs (1) 1989
  - Nail Life Master Open Pairs (1) 1966
  - Grand National Teams (1) 1989
  - Keohane North American Swiss Teams (2) 1986, 2002
  - Chicago Mixed Board-a-Match (1) 2008
  - Reisinger (1) 1978
