= John Schermer =

American bridge player

John Schermer (born 1948) is an American bridge player from Seattle, Washington.

== Bridge accomplishments ==
=== Wins ===
- North American Bridge Championships (5)
  - Vanderbilt (1) 1992
  - Senior Knockout Teams (2) 2005, 2011
  - Keohane North American Swiss Teams (1) 1977
  - Mitchell Board-a-Match Teams (1) 1978

=== Runners-up ===
- North American Bridge Championships (2)
  - Spingold (1) 1986
  - Baze Senior Knockout Teams (1) 2015
