= Steve Robinson (bridge) =

American bridge player (born 1941)

Steve W. Robinson (born January 4, 1941) is an American bridge player from Arlington, Virginia. Robinson has won three world championships and 24 North American Bridge Championships. He was inducted into the ACBL Hall of Fame in 2003.

Robinson is the author of a book, Washington Standard.

Robinson is a graduate of University of Maryland and lives in Washington, D.C..

== Bridge accomplishments ==
=== Honors ===
- ACBL Hall of Fame, 2003

=== Awards ===
- Herman Trophy (1) 1972
- Mott-Smith Trophy (1) 1987

=== Wins ===
- d'Orsi Senior Bowl (1) 2003
- Rosenblum Cup (1) 1986
- World Olympiad Seniors Teams Championship (1) 2000
- North American Bridge Championships (24)
  - Lebhar IMP Pairs (1) 2001
  - Rockwell Mixed Pairs (1) 1985
  - Wernher Open Pairs (1) 1972
  - Blue Ribbon Pairs (2) 1973, 1975
  - North American Pairs (3) 1985, 2016, 2017
  - Grand National Teams (3) 1984, 1988, 1992
  - Jacoby Open Swiss Teams (2) 1986, 2012
  - Vanderbilt (3) 1987, 1991, 1997
  - Senior Knockout Teams (1) 2012
  - Keohane North American Swiss Teams (1) 2013
  - Mitchell Board-a-Match Teams (3) 1978, 1989, 1994
  - Chicago Mixed Board-a-Match (1) 2004
  - Reisinger (2) 1972, 1986

=== Runners-up ===
- d'Orsi Senior Bowl (1) 2011
- North American Bridge Championships (19)
  - von Zedtwitz Life Master Pairs (1) 1987
  - Lebhar IMP Pairs (1) 2004
  - Wernher Open Pairs (2) 1973, 1974
  - Blue Ribbon Pairs (1) 1982
  - Nail Life Master Open Pairs (3) 1971, 1972, 1994
  - Grand National Teams (3) 1977, 1985, 2011
  - Vanderbilt (2) 1992, 1999
  - Mitchell Board-a-Match Teams (2) 1973, 1974
  - Chicago Mixed Board-a-Match (1) 1973
  - Spingold (3) 1979, 1992, 1996
