= Marc Jacobus =

American bridge player (born 1951)

Marc S. Jacobus (born 1951) is a professional American bridge player from Las Vegas, Nevada.

== Bridge accomplishments ==
=== Wins ===
- North American Bridge Championships (7)
  - Blue Ribbon Pairs (1) 2000
  - Nail Life Master Open Pairs (1) 1972
  - Vanderbilt (2) 1995, 2002
  - Senior Knockout Teams (1) 2010
  - Keohane North American Swiss Teams (1) 1986
  - Roth Open Swiss Teams (1) 2007

=== Runners-up ===
- North American Bridge Championships
  - Grand National Teams (2) 1995, 2002
  - Jacoby Open Swiss Teams (4) 1989, 2006, 2009, 2011
  - Truscott Senior Swiss Teams (1) 2011
  - Vanderbilt (1) 2007
  - Senior Knockout Teams (1) 2011
  - Keohane North American Swiss Teams (1) 2002
  - Reisinger (1) 1974
  - Roth Open Swiss Teams (1) 2009
  - Spingold (1) 2000
