= Nikolay Demirev =

American bridge player

Nikolay Demirev is an American bridge player.

== List of Bridge Accomplishments ==
=== Wins ===
- North American Bridge Championships (5)
  - North American Pairs (1) 2005
  - Lebhar IMP Pairs (2) 2004, 2009
  - Nail Life Master Open Pairs (1) 2008
  - Wernher Open Pairs (1) 2009

=== Runners-up ===
- North American Bridge Championships (2)
  - North American Pairs (1) 2010
  - von Zedtwitz Life Master Pairs (1) 2009
