= John Sutherlin =

American bridge player (1936–2018)

John C. Sutherlin (November 7, 1936 – May 12, 2018) was an American bridge player from Dallas, Texas. He won the North American Bridge Championships 12 times and received both the Fishbein Trophy and the Mott-Smith Trophy.

Sutherlin died on May 12, 2018, at the age of 81.

== Bridge accomplishments ==
=== Awards ===
- Fishbein Trophy (1) 1993
- Mott-Smith Trophy (1) 1990

=== Wins ===
- North American Bridge Championships (12)
  - von Zedtwitz Life Master Pairs (1) 1993
  - Nail Life Master Open Pairs (1) 1995
  - Grand National Teams (1) 2006
  - Jacoby Open Swiss Teams (1) 1990
  - Truscott Senior Swiss Teams (1) 2013
  - Vanderbilt (2) 1990, 1993
  - Senior Knockout Teams (2) 1994, 2003
  - Mitchell Board-a-Match Teams (1) 1983
  - Chicago Mixed Board-a-Match (1) 1976
  - Spingold (1) 1981

=== Runners-up ===
- World Mixed Pairs (1) 1982
- North American Bridge Championships
  - Rockwell Mixed Pairs (2) 1962, 1994
  - Blue Ribbon Pairs (1) 1999
  - Grand National Teams (1) 1998
  - Jacoby Open Swiss Teams (1) 1991
  - Truscott Senior Swiss Teams (2) 2001, 2005
  - Vanderbilt (1) 1985
  - Senior Knockout Teams (1) 2010
  - Keohane North American Swiss Teams (2) 1982, 1996
  - Mitchell Board-a-Match Teams (2) 1967, 1997
  - Chicago Mixed Board-a-Match (1) 2005
