= Perry Johnson (ice hockey) =

Canadian ice hockey player

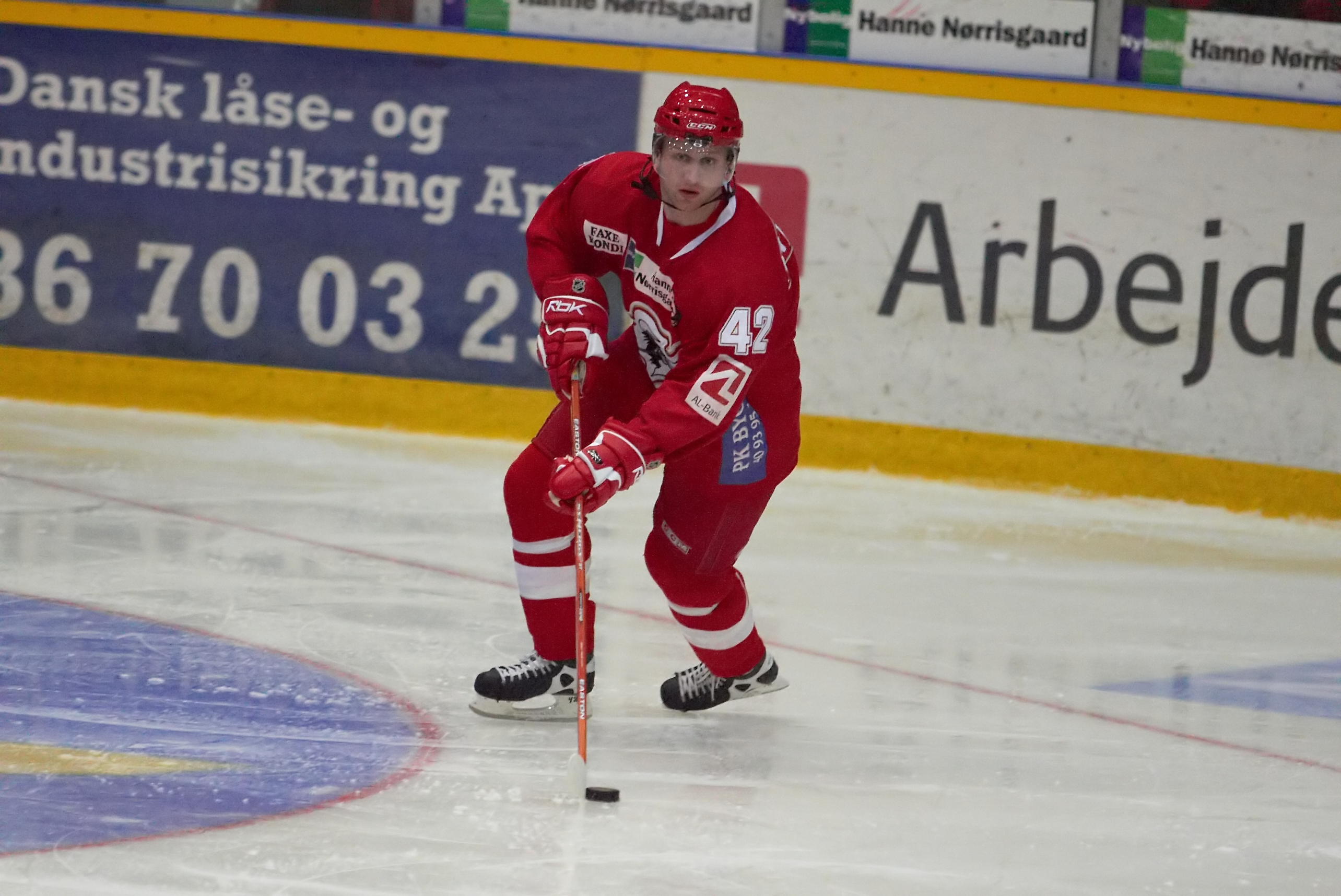
- Perry Johnson in action
- Born: March 23, 1977 (age 47); Edmonton, Alberta, Canada
- Height: 5 ft 11 in (180 cm)
- Weight: 172 lb (78 kg; 12 st 4 lb)
- Position: Defence
- Shot: Left
- Oddset Ligaen team Former teams: Rødovre Mighty Bulls; Kansas City Blades; Manchester Storm; Storhamar Dragons
- Playing career: 1998–2001; 2006–present

Perry Johnson (born March 23, 1977) is a Canadian professional ice hockey defencemen. He has played for the Manchester Storm, Kansas City Blades and Rødovre Mighty Bulls professionally as well as several years in amateur hockey with the Canadian National Team and the University of Alberta.

== Playing career ==
Raised in Edmonton, Alberta, Johnson played junior hockey with the Regina Pats for four seasons from 1993–94 until 1997–98 when he joined the Spokane Chiefs in time for their hosting of the 1998 Memorial Cup championship. In 1994–95, Johnson played two games for the Canadian National Team and he joined the team in 1998–99, playing two seasons, with a professional tryout with the Kansas City Blades. In 2000, he played professional hockey in Europe with the Manchester Storm. In 2002, Johnson returned to Alberta, entering the University of Alberta, playing hockey for the university in the CIS. He won two national championships with the U of A in 2005 and 2006. After his years at Alberta, he played the 2006–07 season in Europe with the Storhamar Dragons in Norway. He has played the last two years (2007–08 and 2008–09) in Europe with the Rødovre Mighty Bulls in Denmark.
