= Eddie Wold =

American bridge player

Edward M. "Eddie" Wold (born 1951) is an American professional bridge player from Houston, Texas. Wold is a graduate of Rice University. Wold is an accomplished teacher and plays regularly at Houston's Westside Bridge Academy, particularly in that club's Saturday afternoon "common game," where over a thousand pairs from all over the country play identical boards (the same cards).

== Bridge accomplishments ==
=== Awards ===
- Herman Trophy (1) 1990
- Mott-Smith Trophy (3) 1989, 1998, 2005

=== Wins ===
- North American Bridge Championships (15)
  - Silodor Open Pairs (1) 2005
  - Grand National Teams (2) 1977, 1981
  - Jacoby Open Swiss Teams (1) 1991
  - Vanderbilt (2) 1979, 1982
  - Senior Knockout Teams (1) 2010
  - Keohane North American Swiss Teams (1) 2008
  - Mitchell Board-a-Match Teams (2) 1984, 1987
  - Chicago Mixed Board-a-Match (1) 1990
  - Reisinger (2) 1985, 2003
  - Spingold (2) 1977, 1984

=== Runners-up ===
- North American Bridge Championships
  - von Zedtwitz Life Master Pairs (1) 1994
  - Wernher Open Pairs (1) 1993
  - Grand National Teams (2) 1998, 2004
  - Jacoby Open Swiss Teams (2) 1998, 2011
  - Truscott Senior Swiss Teams (1) 2011
  - Senior Knockout Teams (1) 2011
  - Keohane North American Swiss Teams (2) 2006, 2022
  - Mitchell Board-a-Match Teams (2) 1990, 2000
  - Chicago Mixed Board-a-Match (3) 1984, 1994, 2003
  - Reisinger (3) 1980, 1990, 1997
  - Roth Open Swiss Teams (1) 2009
