= Garey Hayden =

American bridge player (1944–2015)

Garey Mark Hayden (September 9, 1944 – February 5, 2015) was an American professional bridge player and instructor from Tucson, Arizona.

A World Bridge Federation (WBF) Seniors Grand Master, Hayden won five World Bridge Championships senior teams titles and nine North American Bridge Championships.

A native of Easton, Maryland, Hayden was the son of Thomas and Mary Hayden. His family moved to Tucson when he was 4 years old. Hayden attended the University of Arizona, where he first learned to play bridge in 1966, and was a champion wrestler. In addition to bridge, he owned several businesses, including a travel agency, tropical fish store, and a computer store.

His last major win was at the 41st World Bridge Championships in Bali, Indonesia in 2013 for the American team. The German team "won" the final and was awarded the Gold Medal in Bali. The American team had lodged a complaint during the final that one of the German pairs were illegally passing information by coughing. After an investigation by the WBF, the German pair was found guilty, the German team were stripped of their Gold Medal and the American team awarded first place. Hayden died before the medal was awarded to him.

At his death in Tucson at age 70, Hayden placed 8th on the American Contract Bridge League (ACBL) all-time lifetime Masterpoints achievement rankings with 46,934.78 points.

== Bridge accomplishments ==
=== Wins ===
- World Team Championships - Senior Teams (4) 2001, 2003, 2005, 2013
- World Series Championships - Senior Teams (1) 2009,
- North American Bridge Championships (9)
  - Silodor Open Pairs (1) 1975
  - Wernher Open Pairs (1) 1977
  - Senior Knockout Teams (1) 2009
  - Keohane North American Swiss Teams (3) 1982, 1985, 1990
  - Mitchell Board-a-Match Teams (2) 1973, 1992
  - Chicago Mixed Board-a-Match (1) 1996

=== Runners-up ===
- North American Bridge Championships
  - von Zedtwitz Life Master Pairs (1) 1976
  - Blue Ribbon Pairs (1) 1972
  - Nail Life Master Open Pairs (1) 1997
  - Grand National Teams (2) 1989, 2002
  - Senior Knockout Teams (1) 2013
  - Keohane North American Swiss Teams (1) 1986
  - Chicago Mixed Board-a-Match (1) 2008
  - Spingold (1) 1999
