= Reese Milner =

American bridge player

Reese Milner is an American bridge player. He is a Bridge World Champion. He lives in Sarasota, Florida. Milner ranks number one in the World Bridge Federation Seniors List as of December 2020.

== Bridge accomplishments ==
=== Wins ===
- World Senior Teams Championship (1) 2010
- North American Bridge Championships (3)
  - Senior Knockout Teams (1) 2008
  - Keohane North American Swiss Teams (1) 2012
  - Vanderbilt (1) 2002

=== Runners-up ===
- World Transnational Open Teams Championship (1) 2000
- World Olympiad Seniors Teams Championship (1) 2008
- North American Bridge Championships (2)
  - Mitchell Board-a-Match Teams (1) 2003
  - von Zedtwitz Life Master Pairs (1) 2004
