= Bart Bramley =

American bridge player

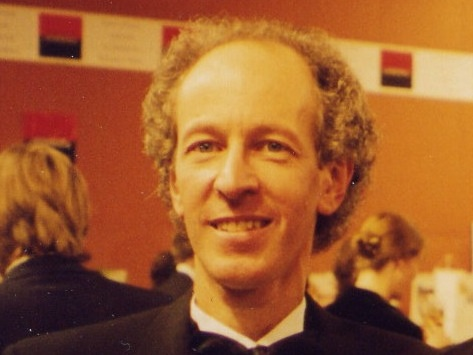
Bramley in 1998

Bart Bramley (born 1948) is an American bridge player and a member of the ACBL Hall of Fame. Bramley is from Connecticut originally, and moved back there in 2024. Bramley has lived in Boston, Seattle, Chicago, and Dallas. Bramley's late wife Judy Bramley was also a Bridge player.

== Bridge accomplishments ==
=== Awards ===
- ACBL Player of the Year (1) 1997
- Herman Trophy (1) 1997
- Mott-Smith Trophy (1) 1997

=== Wins ===
- North American Bridge Championships (17)
  - von Zedtwitz Life Master Pairs (1) 2006
  - Silodor Open Pairs (1) 1984
  - Blue Ribbon Pairs (2) 2002, 2009
  - Nail Life Master Open Pairs (2) 1987, 1995
  - Jacoby Open Swiss Teams (3) 1984, 1990, 1997
  - Roth Open Swiss Teams (1) 2013
  - Vanderbilt (1) 1989
  - Senior Knockout Teams (1) 2013, 2014, 2016
  - Keohane North American Swiss Teams (1) 2008
  - Mitchell Board-a-Match Teams (1) 1980
  - Reisinger (1) 1997

=== Runners-up ===
- North American Bridge Championships (15)
  - Rockwell Mixed Pairs (1) 1981
  - Wernher Open Pairs (1) 1997
  - Grand National Teams (2) 1988, 2004
  - Jacoby Open Swiss Teams (2) 1991, 1994, 2023
  - Vanderbilt (1) 1986
  - Senior Knockout Teams (1) 2012
  - Mitchell Board-a-Match Teams (2) 1976, 1987
  - Baldwin Open Pairs (1)
  - Reisinger (1) 2012
  - Spingold (2) 1981, 1988
