= World Senior Teams Championship =

Competition held as part of the World Bridge Championships

The World Senior Teams Championship is one of the competitions held as part of the World Bridge Championships. This event was initiated in 1994 and is held every four years. It is not necessary that all team members be from the same country. Prior to 2005 all members of each team had to be at least 55 years of age. The World Bridge Federation (WBF) has decided that, as from 2005, the minimum age for a player to be recognized as Senior will be increasing one year per year, until it reaches 60 years in 2010. The decision ensures that 55-year-olds who participated in a senior event in 2003 will never become ex-Seniors.

== Results ==
Year, Site, Entries		Medalists
1994 Albuquerque, USA 20 teams	1.	(Austria) (Netherlands) (Israel) Rohan; Franz Baratta (AUT), Bob Kaiser (NED), Kees Kaiser (NED), Moshe Katz (ISR), Nissan Rand (ISR), Karl Rohan (AUT)
1994 Albuquerque, USA 20 teams	2.	(United States) Levine; Russell Arnold, Billy Eisenberg, Fred Hamilton, Zeke Jabbour, Mike Levine, Tom Sanders (USA)
1994 Albuquerque, USA 20 teams	3.	(United States) (Canada) Ryder; Howard Hertzberg (USA), Duncan Phillips (CAN), Robert Ryder (USA), Bill Solomon (CAN)
1998 Lille, France 38	1.	(Austria) (Bulgaria) (Israel) Rohan; Franz Baratta (AUT), Christo Drumev (BUL), Moshe Katz (ISR), Nissan Rand (ISR), Karl Rohan (AUT)
1998 Lille, France 38	2.	Szenberg; Aleksander Jezioro, Julian Klukowski, Stefan Szenberg, Andrzej Wilkosz (Poland)
1998 Lille, France 38	3.	Orlow; Czesław Czyżkowski, Wacław Janicki, Andrzej Milde, Józef Pochroń, Kazimierz Puczyński, Włodzimierz Stobiecki (Poland)
2002 Montreal, Canada 31	1.	(Canada) (United States) Holt; Boris Baran (CAN), Joe Godefrin (USA), Diana Holt (USA), George Mittelman (CAN), Ed Schulte (USA)
2002 Montreal, Canada 31	2.	(United States) Freed; Nels Erickson, Lew Finkel, Gene Freed, Joe Kivel, Chris Larsen, Bernie Miller (USA)
2002 Montreal, Canada 31	3.	Schippers; Jan Willem Bomhof, Roald Ramer, Elly Schippers, Henk Schippers (Netherlands)
2006 Verona, Italy 42	1.	(Poland) (United States) (Israel) Markowicz; Aleksander Jezioro (POL), Julian Klukowski (POL), Wiktor Markowicz (USA), Victor Melman (USA), Jerzy Zaremba (POL), Shalom Zeligman (ISR)
2006 Verona, Italy 42	2.	(United States) Finkel; Lew Finkel, Gaylor Kasle, John Mohan, John Sutherlin (USA)
2006 Verona, Italy 42	3.	Netherlands 1 Willem Boegem, Nico Doremans, Onno Janssens, Nico Klaver, Roald Ramer, Jaap Trouwborst (Netherlands)
2010 Philadelphia, USA 34 teams	1.	(England) (United States) Hackett; Paul Hackett (ENG), Gunnar Hallberg (ENG), Garey Hayden (USA), John Holland (ENG), Reese Milner (USA)
2010 Philadelphia, USA 34 teams	2.	(Poland) (United States) (Netherlands) (Israel) Team Markowicz; Julian Klukowski (POL), Wictor Markowicz (POL), Victor Melman (USA), Roald Ramer (NED), Jerzy Russyan (POL), Shalom Zeligman (ISR)
2010 Philadelphia, USA 34 teams	3.	Gabrial UI; Michael Bambang Hartono, Henky Lasut, Eddy Manoppo, Denny Sacul, Munawar Sawiruddin (Indonesia)
2014 Sanya, China 22	1.	(United States) Milner; Reese Milner (captain), Hemant Lall (USA); Michel Bessis, Philippe Cronier (France); Apolinary Kowalski, Jacek Romański (Poland)
2014 Sanya, China 22	2.	(United States) Sternberg; James Marsh Sternberg (captain), Neil Chambers, Billy Eisenberg, Arnold Fisher, Fred Hamilton, John Schermer (USA)
2014 Sanya, China 22	3.	Hackett — Paul Hackett (captain), John Holland, John Sansom (England), Christian Mari (France)
2014 Sanya, China 22	3.	(United States) Lewis — Paul Lewis (captain), Ross Grabel, Mark Itabashi, Linda Lewis (USA); Jurek Czyzowicz, Dan Jacob (Canada)
