= Kyle Larsen =

American bridge player

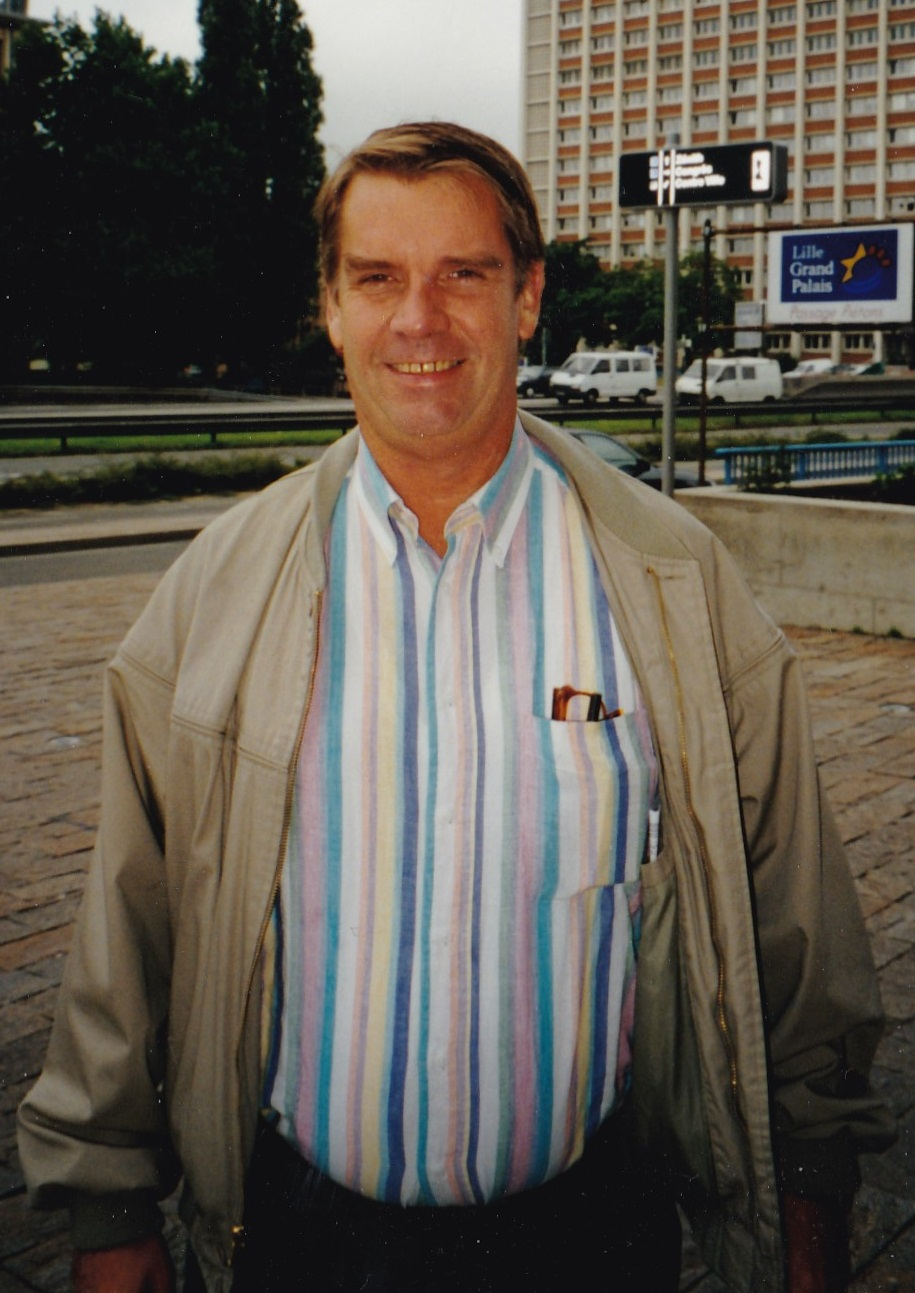
- Kyle Alan Larsen at the 10th World Bridge Championships, Lille, France, 1998
- Born: Kyle Alan Larsen; January 2, 1950; San Francisco, California, U.S.
- Died: August 21, 2012 (aged 62)
- Occupation: Bridge player

Kyle Alan Larsen (January 2, 1950 – August 21, 2012) was a professional American bridge player. He won two world titles: the 2001 Bermuda Bowl in Paris and 2006 Rosenblum Cup in Verona, as well as 12 national titles and 9 runners-up.

He was born in San Francisco, California – the son of two tournament bridge players – and lived in the Bay Area until his death. At the age of 15 he became the youngest ACBL Life Master at that time; when he won Reisinger Board-a-Match Teams in 1968, aged 18, he was the youngest player ever to win a major North American title. His bridge partner for many years was Rose Meltzer; together they won both world championships and five North American Bridge Championships titles.

Larsen was elected to the ACBL Hall of Fame by his peers in 2012, announced in April.

Larsen died in August 2012 after a long battle with prostate cancer.

== Bridge accomplishments ==
=== Honors ===
- ACBL Hall of Fame, 2012
