= Neil Chambers =

American architect, writer and blogger

- Born: September 5, 1974 (age 51); United States
- Occupation: Designer
- Known for: Writer, blogger

Neil Chambers (born September 5, 1974, in the United States) is an American designer, writer, blogger and green building expert. He heads the green design and consulting company Chambers Design, Inc which was founded in 2005. In 2002, Chambers co-founded Green Ground Zero to advocate for the rebuilding of Lower Manhattan to be green in the aftermath of the terrorist's attack of September 11, 2001. Chambers work centers on exploring and implementing ways to integrate and interconnect ecology with buildings and infrastructure. Chambers has a growing media presence, both in traditional media and the blogosphere, where his blogs for TreeHugger.com, which is owned by Discovery, has an active following of 8 million readers where he writes about design, architecture, fashion and infrastructure. He is the author of the book entitled Urban Green: Architecture for the Future. He has also been featured in Architectural Record, The Sun News, BBC News, NY1, and Guernica Magazine.

== Biography ==
=== Early career ===
Neil studied architectural design at Clemson University in South Carolina and studio arts at Maryland Institute, College of Art (MICA) in Baltimore, MD. He began working as an interior designer during his graduate studies in Baltimore in 1999. He left MICA in 2000, move to New York City to pursue a career in architecture and green building design. In 2000, he began working with Jacobs Engineering, an international engineering company, where he began working on large-scale infrastructure projects such as the Stillwell Avenue Subway Terminal, the Stanford Metro-North Train Station as well as other transit station, bridges, parks and buildings.

=== Green Ground Zero ===
Neil, along with Marc Brammer and Erik Stowers, co-founded Green Ground Zero after the World Trade Center was attacked on September 11, 2001. The organization was founded to advocate for rebuilding Lower Manhattan with green building practices. From 2002 to 2004, Chambers grew the organization into an international non-profit. He participated in the United Nations World Urban Forum in Barcelona, Spain in September 2004 as well as the World Congress of Architecture in Istanbul, Turkey in 2005.

=== Chambers Design, Inc. ===
Since 2005, Chambers has led Chambers Design to work with projects spanning from small retail spaces to hospitals to master planning to habitat restoration. Many of the projects have received LEED rating for their green features.

=== Urban Green: Architecture for the Future ===
Urban Green: Architecture for the Future is published by Palgrave/MacMillan, one of the largest publishing houses in the world. Urban Green is a revolutionary vision for bringing the power of the conservation and design movements together so we can redesign our cities to be in harmony with the natural world, so to take the next step in the sustainable revolution.

=== Green Building and Design Philosophy ===
Neil approach to green building strives to be both qualitative and quantitative. For larger projects at the infrastructure scale, he sees a need to integrate ecological restoration as a method to remediate ineffective energy, water and other systems. He explores the future of how ecosystems could supersede current infrastructure in his book Urban Green. Chambers has begun to implement his philosophy for ecological and societal functionality with habitat restoration projects in the southeast of the United States.

=== Academia ===
Along with real-world projects, Chambers is active with academics. He has taught classes that couple green building with governmental policy at New York University. He contributed to the Sustainable Design Entrepreneur Certificate Program for the Fashion Institute of Technology. He has also been a visiting lecture at other universities across the United States.

== Awards ==
- 2009 named 1 of 50 Most Beautiful People make the world a more beautiful place by Tonic Magazine
- 2006 National Fellowship from Environmental Leadership Program
