= Dutch Bridge Federation =

National governing body for bridge in the Netherlands

The Dutch Bridge Federation (Dutch: Nederlandse Bridge Bond) is the national governing body for bridge in the Netherlands, based in Utrecht. Founded on 22 November 1930 by Infantry Colonel A. J. E. Lucardie, the federation is the second largest nation member of the European Bridge League, with a 2013 membership of 85,796.

== Organisation ==
=== Board (bestuur) ===
- President (voorzitter): Koos Vrieze
- Vice-president (vicevoorzitter): Adry Janmaat-Uijtewaal, nominated in 2010
- Treasurer (penningmeester): Rob van Leeuwen

== Bridgemate ==
Between 2000 and 2005 Dutchman Ron Bouwland, sponsored by the Dutch Bridge Federation, developed Bridgemate, an electronic bridge scoring device. The original Bridgemate is connected to a computer by cable, while its successor, Bridgemate II, uses a wireless connection. Within the Low Countries, Bridgemate is used by around 1,400 bridge clubs. The World Bridge Federation, the European Bridge League and the American Contract Bridge League also use the device in competitions.

== See also ==
- Dutch contract bridge players
- List of bridge federations
- List of bridge competitions and awards
