= Fred Hamilton (bridge) =

American bridge player (born 1936)

Fred Hamilton (born 1936) is a professional American bridge player. Hamilton is a World Bridge Federation (WBF) World Grand Master and American Contract Bridge League (ACBL) Grand Life Master and inventor of the popular Hamilton convention used to compete over the opponent's 1NT opening bid.

Born and raised in East Lansing, Michigan, he is more recently from Encino, California. Hamilton has won two world championships, the 1976 Bermuda Bowl as a member of the North America team – beating Italy, with three Blue Team players, in the final – and the 1994 World Senior Pairs Championship with Hamish Bennett. He names Billy Eisenberg, Mark Lair, Mike Passell and Paul Soloway as "my favorite partners and good friends".

Hamilton was inducted into the ACBL Hall of Fame in 2003.

== Bridge accomplishments ==
=== Honors ===
- ACBL Hall of Fame, 2003

=== Awards ===
- Herman Trophy (1) 1974

=== Wins ===
- Bermuda Bowl (1) 1976
- World Senior Pairs Championship (1) 1994
- Cavendish Invitational Pairs (1) 1982
- North American Bridge Championships (17)
  - Lebhar IMP Pairs (1) 1989
  - Leventritt Silver Ribbon Pairs (2) 2001, 2012
  - Grand National Teams (1) 1998
  - Truscott Senior Swiss Teams (4) 1998, 2003, 2008, 2013
  - Vanderbilt (1) 1977
  - Senior Knockout Teams (2) 1996, 1998
  - Chicago Mixed Board-a-Match (1) 1976
  - Reisinger (4) 1974, 1975, 1978, 1979
  - Spingold (1) 1979

=== Runners-up ===
- Bermuda Bowl (1) 1977
- World Senior Teams Championship (1) 1994
- World Olympiad Teams Championship (1) 1980
- North American Bridge Championships (16)
  - Leventritt Silver Ribbon Pairs (1) 1992
  - Rockwell Mixed Pairs (1) 2000
  - Wernher Open Pairs (1) 1986
  - Grand National Teams (1) 1974
  - Jacoby Open Swiss Teams (1) 1988
  - Truscott Senior Swiss Teams (2) 2004, 2005
  - Vanderbilt (3) 1972, 1981, 1983
  - Senior Knockout Teams (2) 2006, 2009
  - Keohane North American Swiss Teams (2) 1991, 1992
  - Mitchell Board-a-Match Teams (1) 1980
  - Chicago Mixed Board-a-Match (1) 1967
