= Canadian Bridge Federation =

Body organizing contract bridge in Canada

The Canadian Bridge Federation (CBF), (La Fédération Canadienne de Bridge(FCB)), is the primary organizational body for contract bridge in Canada. Like its American counterpart, the United States Bridge Federation, the CBF promotes bridge by running tournaments for youths and adults and provides financial support for teams that represent Canada in international competition. It publishes a magazine, Bridge Canada.

The CBF conducts the annual Canadian Bridge Championships, a multi-tournament event which includes the Canadian National Team Championships, the Canadian Women's Team Championships, the Canadian Mixed Team Championships, the Canadian Senior Team Championships, the Canadian Open Pair Championships, and the Canadian International Master Point (IMP) Championships. The federation also runs a number of community outreach programs which have raised money for Canadian charities, and acts as a liaison with the American Contract Bridge League (ACBL) and World Bridge Federation (WBF), ensuring that Canadian concerns are raised with those organizations.

The CBF was created by several prominent Canadian bridge players, including Eric Murray, during the 1965 Nationals (now called the North American Bridge Championships) in Chicago. At the time, there were more than 10,000 Canadian members of the ACBL. The federation was also a response to the 1960 World Bridge Olympiad created by the WBF - a chance for Canada to compete on an international level.

The CBF's current constitution provides for six zones, each represented by a zone director. These zones are grouped more or less according to geography, with directors in Halifax, Montreal, Toronto, Winnipeg, Edmonton and Vancouver. The federation's head office is in Toronto.

== See also ==
- CBF Hall of Fame
- List of contract bridge people
- List of bridge federations
- CBF - French (Wikipedia)
