= List of bridge competitions and awards =

Bridge, or more formally contract bridge, is a trick-taking card game of skill played by four players.

== Summary ==
WBF Championships:

The World Bridge Team Championships are held in the odd-numbered years:

1. World Team Championships (Open Series: Bermuda Bowl)
2. World Team Championships (Women series: Venice Cup)
3. World Team Championships (Senior series: d'Orsi Senior Trophy)
4. World Transnational Open Team (WTOT)

The World Bridge Games are held every fourth year, in the same year as the Summer Olympics, previously known as World Team Olympiad.

1. National Open Teams
2. National Women Teams
3. National Senior Teams
4. World Transnational Mixed Team

The World Bridge Series Championships are held every fourth year, in the year of World Cup. It includes the following main events:

1. World Open Knockout Teams (Rosenblum Cup)
2. World Women Knockout Teams (McConnell Cup)
3. World Senior Knockout Teams (Rand Cup)
4. World Mixed Swiss Teams
5. World Mixed Pairs
6. World Open Pairs
7. World Women Pairs
8. World Senior Pairs (Hiron Trophy)

== World Championships ==
=== World Bridge Federation ===
World Bridge Championships conducted by the World Bridge Federation

- "World Teams" or World Bridge Team Championships (biennial, next 2017)
  - Bermuda Bowl —from 1950
  - Venice Cup —from 1974
  - Senior Bowl (bridge) —from 2001
  - World Transnational Open Teams Championship
- "World Series" or World Bridge Series Championships (quadrennial, next 2018)
  - World Open Knockout Teams (Rosenblum Cup) —from 1978
  - World Women Knockout Teams (McConnell Cup) —from 1994
  - World Senior Teams Championship (Rand Cup) —from 1994
  - World Mixed Swiss Teams
  - World Open Pairs Championship —from 1962
  - World Women Pairs Championship —from 1962
  - World Senior Pairs Championship (Hiron Trophy) —from 1990
  - World Mixed Pairs Championship —from 1966
  - World IMP Pairs Championship —from 2006
- "World Bridge Games" or Bridge at the World Mind Sports Games (quadrennial, next 2020)
  - World Masters Individual —from 1992 Open and Women (Juniors 2000 only)
  - World Team Olympiad —1960–2004 national teams events; Open and Women incorporated in the Games 2008 and "Senior International Cup" continued as a non-medal event
  - World Mixed Teams Championship —1962/72/74, 1996–2004, continued as a non-medal event beside the Games 2008
  - Youth events covered below
- World Par Championship —sanctioned by WBF 1961 and 1963, by Culbertson 1932–1941

=== Youth ===
WBF

- World Junior Pairs Championship —covers all WBF competition for Youth Pairs and Individuals

Junior Pairs (under 26) is the oldest event, from 1995, biennial in odd years

- World Junior Teams Championship —covers all WBF competition for Youth Teams

Junior Teams (under 26) is the oldest event, from 1987; biennial now in even years with Olympic years incorporated in the WMSG from 2008

As of 2011-08 University teams are also covered in the Junior Teams article.

- World University Bridge Championships —2000 and biennial from 2004 (at the table); from 2009, annual (online)

9th World University Bridge Championship 2018-10-25 ~ 10-28 Xuzhou, China

=== Others ===
- Commonwealth Nations Bridge Championships —

== Great Britain ==
Events conducted by Bridge Great Britain:

- The Gold Cup, the annual open British knock-out Teams of Four Championship
- The Home International Series, comprising:
  - The Camrose Trophy, an annual competition between teams representing England, the Republic of Ireland, Northern Ireland, Scotland and Wales
  - The Lady Milne Trophy for Women's Teams
  - The Senior Camrose for the Teltscher Trophy
  - The Junior Camrose for players aged under 26 years
  - The Peggy Bayer Trophy for players aged under 21 years

== North America ==
- North American Bridge Championships conducted by the American Contract Bridge League —three annual 11-day meets that include many NABC-level championship events among others
- United States Bridge Championships conducted by the United States Bridge Federation to select national teams, including Open, Women's, Mixed, Senior, and Junior series
- ACBL Hall of Fame
- Mott-Smith: The Geoffrey Mott-Smith Trophy is awarded to the player winning the most masterpoints at the Spring NABC.
- Fishbein: The Sally Fishbein trophy is awarded to the player winning the most masterpoints at the Summer NABC in NABC+ events.
- Championship Player of the Year: The Championship Player of the Year is awarded to the player winning the most masterpoints won at NABCs while playing in unlimited national-rated events, including the North American Open Pairs and excluding the Grand National Team competitions.
- Barry Crane Top 500: The annual Barry Crane Top 500 masterpoint race is won by the player who earns the most colored masterpoints during the year. Masterpoints won on-line do not count.
- Ace of Clubs: The annual Ace of Clubs masterpoint races are won by the player from each masterpoint category through Diamond Life Master who earns the most masterpoints in club games during the year.
- Mini-McKenney: The annual Mini-McKenney masterpoint races are won by the member from each masterpoint category who earns the most total masterpoints during the year.

== Europe ==
- European championships conducted by the European Bridge League
  - European Team Championships — national teams, open flight from 1932
  - European Open Bridge Championships
  - European Youth Teams Championships — national teams, open flight from 1968
  - European Youth Pairs Championships

== Asia Pacific (Zone 6) ==
Far East Bridge Federation & Pacific Asia Bridge Federation.

Asia Pacific Bridge Federation Championships (APBF) (Previously Far East Federation Championships).

=== Members ===
Zonal and National Organizations:

Country / Organization / Membership / Status

1 China Chinese Contract Bridge Association CBA 81,500 OK

2 Hong Kong Hong Kong Contract Bridge Association Ltd HKCBA 432 OK

3 Macau Macau Contract Bridge Association MCBA 81 OK

4 Chinese Taipei Chinese Taipei Contract Bridge Association CTCBA 2,477 OK

5 Indonesia Indonesian Contract Bridge Association IBA 1,365 OK

6 Japan Japan Contract Bridge League Inc JCBL 7,043 OK

7 South Korea Korea Contract Bridge League KCBL 235 OK

8 Malaysia Malaysian Contract Bridge Association MCBA 71 OK

9 Philippines Philippine Tournament Bridge Association PTBA 131 OK

10 Singapore Singapore Contract Bridge Association SCBA 185 OK

11 Thailand Contract Bridge League of Thailand CBLT 3,274 OK

12 Vietnam VietNam Bridge & Poker Sports Association VBPSA N/A OK

Total 96,794

- Membership always refers to the previous year.

Australia

New Zealand

=== Asia Pacific Bridge Federation Championships ===
Year /Host City /Open Team (Rebullid Cup) /Ladies Team(President's Cup) /Senior Team(PABF Senior Cup)

- 1st 1957 Manila Philippines
- 2nd 1958 Tokyo Philippines
- 3rd 1959 Taipei Hong Kong
- 4th 1960 Hong Kong Hong Kong
- 5th 1961 Bangkok Thailand
- 6th 1962 Manila Indonesia
- 7th 1963 Taipei Thailand Chinese Taipei
- 8th 1964 Tokyo Indonesia Thailand
- 9th 1965 Hong Kong Thailand Malaysia
- 10th 1966 Bangkok Thailand Thailand
- 11th 1967 Manila Chinese Taipei Philippines
- 12th 1968 Kuala Lumpur Australia Philippines
- 13th 1969 Taipei Chinese Taipei Singapore
- 14th 1970 Jakarta Australia Indonesia
- 15th 1971 Melbourne Chinese Taipei Singapore
- 16th 1972 Singapore Indonesia Singapore
- 17th 1973 Hong Kong Indonesia Australia
- 18th 1974 Manila Indonesia Australia
- 19th 1975 Bangkok Hong Kong Australia
- 20th 1976 Auckland Chinese Taipei New Zealand
- 21st 1977 Manila India Australia
- 22nd 1978 New Delhi Chinese Taipei India
- 23rd 1979 Tokyo Indonesia Philippines
- 1980 Not held due to the Olympiad
- 24th 1981 Taipei Chinese Taipei New Zealand
- 25th 1982 Bangkok Indonesia Philippines
- 26th 1983 Hong Kong Indonesia New Zealand
- 27th 1984 Macau Indonesia Australia
- 28th 1985 Sydney Japan Australia
- 29th 1986 Penang Chinese Taipei China
- 30th 1987 Shanghai Hong Kong Japan
- 1988 Singapore 1st FEBF Congress
- 31st 1989 Jakarta Chinese Taipei Chinese Taipei
- 32nd 1990 Singapore New Zealand Australia
- 33rd 1991 Guangzhou China China
- 1992 Hong Kong 2nd FEBF Congress
- 34th 1993 Singapore Indonesia China
- 35th 1994 Wellington Chinese Taipei China
- 36th 1995 Perth New Zealand Australia
- 1996 Macau 3rd PABF Congress
- 37th 1997 Hong Kong Chinese Taipei China
- 38th 1998 Kobe China China
- 39th 1999 Hangzhou Indonesia China
- 2000 Jakarta 4th PABF Congress
- 40th 2001 Singapore Chinese Taipei China
- 41st 2002 Bangkok Japan China Indonesia
- 42nd 2003 Manila Indonesia China Japan
- 2004 Taipei 5th PABF Congress
- 43rd 2005 Seoul China China Japan
- 44th 2006 Shanghai China New Zealand Australia
- 45th 2007 Bandung China China Indonesia
- 2008 Surfers' Paradise 6th PABF Congress
- 46th 2009 Macau China China Indonesia
- 47th 2010 Hamilton Chinese Taipei Japan Australia
- Ningbo 1st Asia Cup
- 48th 2011 Kuala Lumpur China China Indonesia
- 2012 Fukuoka 7th APBF Congress
- 49th 2013 Hong Kong Japan Japan Australia
- 2014 Jinhua 2nd Asia Cup
- 50th 2015 Bangkok Japan China Indonesia
- 2016 Beijing 8th APBF Congress
- The 51st APBF Championships 2017-05-28 ~ 06-07 Riviera Hotel, Seoul, Korea
- 52nd Asia Pacific Bridge Federation Championships 2019-06-11 ~ 06-20 York Hotel, Singapore

=== Asia Pacific Bridge Federation Youth Championships (U26 / U21) ===
Asia Pacific Bridge Federation Youth Championships

19th Asia Pacific Bridge Federation Youth Championships Wuhan, China 2013, 19–25 August 2013

20th Asia Pacific Bridge Federation Youth Championships Bangkok, Thailand, 1–7 April 2015

22nd Asia Pacific Bridge Federation Open Youth Championships Bogor, Indonesia April 13–20, 2018 2018 APBF Open Youth Championships

23rd APBF Youth Championships 2019-04-05 ~ 04-11 Bangkok, Thailand

=== Southeast Asia Bridge Federation Championships ===
Southeast Asia Bridge Federation Championships

2nd SEABF Championships 2017-12-06 ~ 12-12 The Margo Hotel, Depok, West Java South East Asia Bridge Federation

3rd Southeast Asia Bridge Federation Championships 2018-11-27 ~ 12-01 Makati City, Philippines

4th Southeast Asia Bridge Federation Championships 2019-11-25 ~ 11-29 Indoor Training Hall, Olympic Council of Malaysia

=== Asia Cup ===
Asia Cup Bridge Championships

2014 Jinhua 2nd Asia Cup 2nd Asia Cup Bridge Championships 2014-06-12 ~ 06-22 ZheJiang WuYi JinHua, China

3rd Asia Cup Bridge Championships 2018-06-04 ~ 06-10 Goa, India, Asia Pacific Bridge Federation

== Asia & Middle East (Zone 4) ==
List of Asia and Middle East Bridge Championships:

=== History ===
Founded in 1979 as Bridge Federation of Asia & the Middle East.

From 5 original NBOs grew to 10 member countries.

In 1996, the Bridge Federation of Africa, Asia & the Middle East (BFAAME) was divided into (the obvious) 3 subzones.

In 2000, the African NBO’s formed Zone 8 of the WBF and Zone 4 was once again renamed to its original Bridge Federation of Asia & the Middle East (BFAME).

=== Members ===
Zonal and National Organizations

Country/Organization/Membership/Status

1 Bangladesh Bangladesh Bridge Federation BngBF 180 OK

2 India Bridge Federation of India BFI 4,650 OK

3 JordanJordan Bridge Federation JBA 250 OK

4 Kuwait Kuwait Mind Sports Association KMSA 66 OK

5 Pakistan Pakistan Bridge Federation PBF 500 OK

6 Palestine Palestine Bridge Federation PaBF 150 OK

7 Saudi Arabia Saudi Arabian Bridge Federation SdABF 67 OK

8 Sri Lanka Bridge Federation of Sri Lanka BFSL 120 OK

9 Syria Syrian Bridge Association SBA N/A OK

10 United Arab Emirates United Arab Emirates Bridge Federation UAEBF 150 OK

Total 6,133

- Membership always refers to the previous year.

=== Championships ===
1st ASIA & MIDDLE EAST CHAMPIONSHIPS - 1981 Venue: Bangalore, India Dates: 11–19 April 1981 (25th Bermuda Bowl (7) & 4th Venice Cup (5), Port Chester, New York, USA. (19-30 Oct.))

2nd ASIA AND MIDDLE EAST CHAMPIONSHIPS - 1983 Venue: Le Meidien Paradise Hotel, Le Morne Peninsula, Port Louise, Mauritius Dates : 13 – 22 May’83.

3rd ASIA & MIDDLE EAST CHAMPIONSHIPS - 1985 Venue: Taj Mahal Hotel, Karachi, Pakistan Dates: 18 – 30 April 1985

CANCELLATION in 1985

4TH ASIA & CHAMPIONSHIPS - 1987 Venue: Taj Samudra Hotel, Colombo, Sri Lanka Dates: 29 March to 9 April 1987

5TH ASIA & MIDDLE EAST CHAMPIONSHIPS-1989 Venue: Ramses Nile Hilton, Cairo, Egypt Dates: 1 to 13 June 1989

6TH ASIA AND MIDDLE EAST CHAMPIONSHIPS - 1991 Venue: Sheraton Hotel, New Delhi, India Dates: 7–17 July 1991

7TH ASIA & MIDDLE EAST CHAMPIONSHIPS-1993 Venue: Le Mauricia Hotel, Grand Bay, Port Louis, Mauritius. Dates: May 1993

8TH AFRICA ASIA & MIDDLE EAST CHAMPIONSHIPS-1995 Venue: Forte Grand Hotel, Amman, Jordan Dates: 22 April 1995 – 3 May 1995.

9TH AFRICA ASIA & MIDDLE EAST CHAMPIONSHIPS-1997 Venue: Arthur Seat Hotel, Cape Town, South Africa. Dates: 16 May 1997- 28 May 1997.

10TH AFRICA ASIA & MIDDLE EAST CHAMPIONSHIPS-1999 Venue: Taj Samudra Hotel, Colombo, Sri Lanka. Dates: 2 Oct 1999 – 14 Oct 1999

11TH ASIA & MIDDLE EAST CHAMPIONSHIPS-2001 Venue: Gulf Hotel, Manama, Bahrain Dates: 23 May 2001 – 2 June 2001.

12TH ASIA & MIDDLE EAST CHAMPIONSHIPS-2003 Venue: Regency Palace Hotel, Amman, Jordan Dates: 1 August 2003 – 9 August 2003.

13th Asia & Middle East Championships-2005 Venue: Sonar Gaon Pan Pacific Hotel, Dhaka, Bangladesh. Dates: 28 April 2005 – 6 May 2005.

14th Asia & Middle East Championships - 2007 Venue: Carlton Hotel, Karachi, Pakistan Dates: 12 May to 20 May 2007

15th Asia & Middle East Championships - 2009 Venue: Regency Palace Hotel, Amman, Jordan Dates: 26 June to 4 July 2009

Zone-4 & Zone-6 merger for the purpose of Olympic continental representation.

16th Asia & Middle East Championships - 2011 Venue: Chola Sheraton, Chennai, India Dates: 26 May to 1 June’11

17th Asia & Middle East Championships - 2013 Venue: Hyatt Ahmedabad, India Dates: 4 June to 11 June’13

18th Asia & Middle East Championships - 2015 Venue: Bristol Hotel, Amman, Jordan Dates: 27 May to 3 June’15

19th Asia & Middle East Championships - 2017 Venue: Holiday Inn Al Barsha Hotel, Dubai, UAE. Dates: Monday 3rd to Tuesday 11 April 2017.

20th BFAME Championships was tentatively awarded to Kuwait in 2019.

2021 TBD.

== Africa ==
- African Bridge Championships

== North America ==
- North American Bridge Championships

== Central American & Caribbean ==
- Central American & Caribbean Bridge Championships

== South America ==
- South American Bridge Championships

== South Pacific ==
- South Pacific Bridge Championships

== Other ==
- Buffett Cup —biennial "Europe vs North America at Bridge" modeled after the Ryder Cup of golf
- Cavendish Invitational —invitation-only money tournament operated by World Bridge Productions
- Macallan Invitational Pairs (previously known as the Sunday Times Invitational Pairs) —invitation event held in London sponsored by the manufacturers of The Macallan whisky. It was last held in 1999.

== Player competitions and awards ==
- Triple crown of bridge

== See also ==
- List of contract bridge books
- List of contract bridge magazines
- List of contract bridge people
