= South African Bridge Federation =

National governing body

- Sport: Bridge
- Abbreviation: SABF
- Founded: 1954
- Affiliation: World Bridge Federation
- Affiliation date: 1960
- Regional affiliation: African Bridge Federation
- President: James Grant
- Secretary: Kit Gilmour

Official website
- www.sabf.co.za
- (South Africa)

The South African Bridge Federation (SABF) is the national governing body, custodian and regulator for the card game of bridge in South Africa. SABF is affiliated to the world governing body World Bridge Federation (WBF), the regional continental body African Bridge Federation (ABF), and SASCOC.

SABF organises national competitions such as the South African Bridge Congress, and the SABF Interclub. Every 2 years the SABF enters teams in the African Zonals and should they qualify will go on to represent South Africa in one or more of the 4 sections of the World Bridge Championships being the Bermuda Bowl (Open), the Venice Cup (Women), D' Orsi Bowl (Seniors) and the Wuhan Cup (Mixed)).

== History ==
South African Bridge Federation (SABF) was established in 1954, while its affiliation to World Bridge Federation (WBF) was achieved in 1960. In 1984, an attempt to expel SABF from international events and the WBF due to the apartheid policies of the South African government was averted when the SABF agreed not to send teams to competitions unless invited.

== See also ==
- Sport in South Africa
- List of contract bridge governing bodies
- List of bridge competitions and awards
