= Russ Arnold =

American bridge player

Russell D. "Russ" Arnold (March 6, 1921 – January 27, 2012) was an American bridge player. He was world champion at the 1981 Bermuda Bowl and winner of nine North American titles.

Born in Winnipeg, Manitoba, Canada, he graduated from the University of Minnesota. Long-time from Miami, Florida, he was an accountant and partner in running a successful major appliance business and so did not play bridge often, making his achievements all the more remarkable.

Arnold was inducted into the ACBL Hall of Fame in 2011 as recipient of the annual Von Zedtwitz Award, which recognizes players who have achieved prominence in the game and have an outstanding tournament record but who may not have been in the limelight for some years".

== Bridge accomplishments ==
=== Honors ===
- ACBL Hall of Fame, von Zedtwitz Award 2011

=== Wins ===
- North American Bridge Championships (9)
  - Grand National Teams (1) 1973
  - Vanderbilt (2) 1980, 1993
  - Senior Knockout Teams (3) 1994, 1995, 1996
  - Reisinger (1) 1979
  - Spingold (2) 1963, 1985

=== Runners-up ===
- North American Bridge Championships
  - Grand National Teams (1) 1980
  - Truscott Senior Swiss Teams (1) 2002
  - Vanderbilt (1) 1960
  - Senior Knockout Teams (1) 1997
  - Spingold (1) 1987
