= Garozzo =

Garozzo is a surname. Notable people with the surname include:

- Benito Garozzo (born 1927), Italian-American bridge player
- Enrico Garozzo (born 1989), Italian épée fencer
- Daniele Garozzo (born 1992), Italian foil fencer, brother of Enrico
