= Chung Ching Wei =

Chinese-American businessman (1914–1987)

- Simplified Chinese: 魏重庆
- Traditional Chinese: 魏重慶
Transcriptions
Standard Mandarin
- Hanyu Pinyin: Wèi Chóngqìng
- Wade–Giles: Wei Chung-ch'ing

Chung Ching (C. C., Charles C.) Wei (July 12, 1914 – February 20, 1987) was a Chinese-born American businessman who created the Precision Club bidding system in contract bridge.

== Biography ==
Wei was born in Sheng County, Zhejiang Province, China. He received his B.E. in electrical engineering from Shanghai Jiao Tong University in 1936. In 1942, during World War II, he went to the United States. After the war he became a successful entrepreneur in the shipping industry.

Wei was a member of the ACBL Greater New York Bridge Association. As a player, he was renowned for partnership agreements to compete vigorously through the 2-level, especially at matchpoints. He sometimes played at the Mayfair Club.

Wei died of complications from diabetes at age 72, in New York Hospital, then a resident of New York and Houston. He was survived by his wife Kathie Wei, a son, a daughter, and three stepchildren.

== Achievements in bridge ==
In 1963, "with assistance from Alan Truscott" Wei developed the China bidding system, later called the Precision Club. He was not an expert player, and the system did not attract much attention from the bridge community. That changed when the Taiwan national team, (Note: Thailand had been the first to represent the Far East in Bermuda Bowl tournaments, both 1966 and 1967. Thailand, the Philippines, and Australia had been the only teams from East of Lebanon and Israel among 33 entries in the 1968 World Team Olympiad open flight. Taiwan teams used the bidding system successfully in the 1967 to 1969 Far East Bridge Championships – winning in 1967 and 1969.) trained and led by Wei, finished as runner-up in the 1969 Bermuda Bowl world team championship, relegating a strong North America team to third place. With two returning players and four new ones, Taiwan was losing finalists again in 1970, and these strong showings brought Wei and the Precision Club great recognition. In order to promote the system, Wei sponsored "a number of top-level teams" to use it. The most successful, which came to be called simply the Precision Team, formed in 1970 and won the ACBL Spingold knockout tournament that year, beating the defending champions who were also 1970 Bermuda Bowl champions. Before it disbanded mid-1973, the team won another Spingold and a Vanderbilt Cup, and two of its pairs finished first and second in the 1973 Sunday Times Invitational Pairs, London.

Italy's Blue Team, which had retired after beating Taiwan in 1969, adopted versions of the Precision system for its successful return to competitive international play in the 1972 World Team Olympiad. Its strongest pair, Giorgio Belladonna and Benito Garozzo, used their Super Precision version through the 1970s and led Italy to three more Bermuda Bowl championships 1973 to 1975. The great success of the Precision systems began a wave of strong club systems all over the world. According to Truscott, Precision systems constituted "by far the most popular non-standard method throughout the world" at the time of the inventor's death.

== Books ==
- Precision Bidding in Bridge: the Story of the Cinderella Team (Port Chester, NY: Barclay Bridge, 1969) OCLC 48552; reprinted as The Precision Bidding System in Bridge (Dover Pub, 1973), ISBN 0486211711 LCCN 73-77632
- Simplified Precision Bridge (Barclay, 1972)
- Match Point Precision, Wei and Ron Andersen (Monna Lisa Precision Corp., 1975); revised and expanded, 1978, ISBN 087643037X

This may be Bidding Precisely, Vol. 1. One presentation of the series by a Thailand bridge club credits Andersen as co-author of four books but provides a cover image that shows Bidding Precisely, Volume 1 and names Wei alone; no long title or co-author credit on the cover.

- Making the Most of Limited Openings, Bidding Precisely Vol. 2, Wei and Andersen (Monna Lissa, 1976)
- Profits from Preempts, Bidding Precisely Vol. 3, Wei and Andersen (Monna Lissa, 1977); reprint Louisville, KY: Devyn Press, ISBN 0910791376
- Perfect Your Notrump Bidding, Bidding Precisely Vol. 4, Wei and Andersen (Monna Lisa, 1978)
- Precision Bidding for Everyone, Charles Goren and Wei (Doubleday, 1978) ISBN 0385147090
