= Senior Knockout Teams =

National bridge championship

The Baze Senior Knockout Teams national bridge championship was held at the fall American Contract Bridge League (ACBL) North American Bridge Championship (NABC).

The Senior Knockout Teams was a knock-out team event. The event typically started on the first Sunday of the NABC. The event was restricted to Seniors – players 55 years of age or older.

== History ==
The event was introduced in 1994. It was renamed in 2010 in honor of Grant Baze and is contested for the Baze Trophy. It was dropped from the ACBL schedule effective January 1, 2019.

== Winners ==
Senior Knockout Teams, 1994 to 2018
Year	Winners	Runners-up
1994	Zeke Jabbour, Russ Arnold, Richard Hunt, Dan Morse, Chuck Said, John Sutherlin	Duncan Phillips, Robert Ryder, Howard Hertzberg, Hamish Bennett, Joan Remey Moore, William Esberg
1995	Zeke Jabbour, Russ Arnold, Mike Levine, Billy Eisenberg, Benito Garozzo, Tommy Sanders	Norm Coombs, Leonard Ernst, Michael Slaven, Richard Hart, Loren Hawkins, Don Brock
1996	Zeke Jabbour, Russ Arnold, Tommy Sanders, Billy Eisenberg, Mary Chilcote, Fred Hamilton	Howard Hertzberg, Robert Ryder, William Esberg, Simon Kantor, Marty Baff
1997	Bob Carteaux, David Adams, Al Childs, Ralph Cohen, Chuck Said	Mike Levine, Zeke Jabbour, Jim Linhart, Russ Arnold, Per Olof Sundelin, Arnold Fisher
1998	Mike Levine, Tommy Sanders, Zeke Jabbour, Arnie Fisher, Fred Hamilton, Chuck Said	Gene Freed, Gene Simpson, James Koley, Syd Levey, Simon Kantor
1999	Jim Sternberg, Bernie Chazen, Allan Cokin, Billy Eisenberg, Richard Reisig, Robert Lipsitz	Richard Budd, Shome Mukherjee, Robert Ryder, William Hunter
2000	Richard Budd, Robert Ryder, William Hunter, Shome Mukherjee, Richard DeMartino, Pat McDevitt	Jim Sternberg, Allan Cokin, Chuck Burger, Richard Reisig, Bernie Chazen, Robert Lipsitz
2001	Mike Levine, Zeke Jabbour, Randy Pettit, Allan Siebert, Per Olof Sundelin, Arnold Fisher	Gene Simpson, Hamish Bennett, Billy Eisenberg, Joe Kivel, Jim Robison, Chris Larsen
2002	Mike Levine, Zeke Jabbour, Bobby Wolff, Dan Morse, Per Olof Sundelin, Arnold Fisher	Lewis Finkel, John Stiefel, Daniel Colatosti, Mel Colchamiro, John Malley, Bernie Miller
2003	Dennis Dawson, Clement Jackson, John Sutherlin, Bobby Wolff, John Mohan, Dan Morse	Pat McDevitt, John Stiefel, Daniel Colatosti, Mel Colchamiro, John Malley, Richard DeMartino
2004	Tony Ames, John Koch, Mary Egan, Rod Beery	Hamish Bennett, Frances Dickman, Chris Larsen, Gene Simpson, Michael Shuman, Bruce Noda
2005	Morris Chang, Bobby Wolff, Neil Chambers, John Schermer	Don Stack, Alan Stout, Randy Pettit, Allan Siebert, James Nash, Pierre Flatowicz
2006	Amos Kaminski, Melih Ozdil, Pinhas Romik, Yeshayahu Levit, George Mittelman	Gene Freed, Fred Hamilton, Arnold Fisher, Jim Tritt, Paul Ivaska, Tony Kasday
2007	Bruce Ferguson, Dennis Clerkin, Brenda Keller, Jerry Clerkin, Robert Hollman	Mike Levine, Zeke Jabbour, Bobby Wolff, Dan Morse, Allan Siebert, Chuck Said
2008	Reese Milner, Sam Lev, Fred Chang, Matt Granovetter, P.O. Sundelin, John Carruthers; Grant Baze, npc	Richard DeMartino, John Stiefel, Geoffrey Brod, Pat McDevitt
2009	Garey Hayden, Mark Lair, Carolyn Lynch, Melih Ozdil, Mike Passell	Arnie Fisher, Allan Graves, Fred Hamilton, Amos Kaminski, George Mittelman
2010	Roger Bates, Drew Casen, Marc Jacobus, Jim Krekorian, Eddie Wold	Dan Gerstman, Steve Landen, Dan Morse, Fred Stewart, John Sutherlin, Kit Woolsey
2011	Bill Pollack, William Pollack, Mark Feldman, Rose Meltzer, John Schermer, Neil Chambers	Lou Ann O'Rourke, Marc Jacobus, Eddie Wold, James Krekorian, Drew Casen, Roger Bates
2012	Fred Stewart, Kit Woolsey, Steve Robinson, Peter Boyd, Larry Kozlove, Gary Kasle	Bart Bramley, Billy Miller, Vinita Gupta, Jeff Meckstroth, Lew Stansby, Bob Hamman
2013	Bart Bramley, Billy Miller, Vinita Gupta, Jeff Meckstroth, Eric Rodwell, Lew Stansby	Mike Passell, Garey Hayden, Carolyn Lynch, Cezary Balicki, Adam Zmudzinski
2014	Bart Bramley, Billy Miller, Vinita Gupta, Jeff Meckstroth, Eric Rodwell, Lew Stansby	Mike Passell, Garey Hayden, Carolyn Lynch, Cezary Balicki, Adam Zmudzinski, Marc Jacobus
2015	Rose Meltzer, John Mohan, Ron Smith, Dan Morse, Steve Garner, John Sutherlin	Mike Passell, Marc Jacobus, Larry Kozlove, Gaylor Kasle, John Schermer, Neil Chambers
2016	Bart Bramley, Nick Nickell, Jeff Meckstroth, Eric Rodwell, Ralph Katz, Bob Hamman	Paul Lewis, Mitch Dunitz, Linda Lewis, James Krekorian, Drew Casen, Iftikhar Baqai
2017	Mike Passell, Marc Jacobus, Eddie Wold, Mike Levine, Dennis Clerkin, Jerry Clerkin	Nick Nickell, Jeff Meckstroth, Bobby Levin, Michael Rosenberg, Eric Rodwell, Ralph Katz
2018	P Drew Cannell, Gaylor Kasle, James Krekorian, Wlodzimierz Starkowski, Drew Casen, Michael Kwiecien	Nick Nickell, Jeff Meckstroth, Bobby Levin, Eric Rodwell, Ralph Katz, Bob Hamman

== Sources ==
- List of previous winners, Page 6. Daily Bulletin (PDF), vol. 81–1, November 21, 2008
- 2008 winners, Page 1. Daily Bulletin (PDF), vol. 81–7, November 27, 2008
- "Search Results: Baze Senior Knockout Teams". ACBL. Visit "NABC Winners"; select a Fall NABC. Retrieved 2014-06-06.
