= Argentine Bridge Association =

The Argentine Bridge Association (Spanish: Asociación del Bridge Argentino) is the national organisation charged with regulating and promoting the game of bridge in Argentina. Its headquarters are in Buenos Aires. It was founded in 1928. The current president is Silvia Elena and the vice president is Roberto Vigil.

The Argentine Bridge Association is affiliated with the World Bridge Federation.

Argentina is a top nation in bridge.

== Board ==
- President: Jorge Campdepadrós
- Vice president: Guillermo Lega
- Secretary: Enrique Boschetti
- Treasurer: Julio Alfonsin

The president and the vice president are elected for a 3-year term.

== Argentine bridge players ==
- Gabino Alujas
- Maria José Rueda
- Hector Cambreros
- Roberto Vigil, ex vice president of the Argentine Bridge Association

== See also ==
- List of bridge federations
