= Hungarian Bridge Federation =

National organisation for bridge in Hungary

- Founded: 1873
- Regional affiliation: EBL
- Affiliation date: 1954
- Chairman: Tibor Nádasi

The Hungarian Bridge Federation (Hungarian: Magyar Bridzs Szövetség, pronounced [ˈmɒɟɒr ˈbrid͡ʒː ˈsøvɛt͡ʃːeːɡ]- MBSZ) is the national organisation for bridge in Hungary. The chairman is Tibor Nádasi and the deputy chairman is Gábor Winkler. The headquarters are in Budapest. The Hungarian Bridge Federation is affiliated to the World Bridge Federation. The federation programs international tournaments for the bridge players from the country.

== Organization ==
=== Board of directors ===
==== Working ====
The federation is ruled by a chairman and a deputy chairman and a general secretary.

==== Current officers ====
- chairman : Tibor Nádasi
- deputy chairman : Gábor Winkler
- general secretary :

== See also ==
- Hungary
- Contract bridge
- World Bridge Federation
- List of bridge federations

== Site ==
- A Magyar Bridzs Szövetség régi honlapja (in Hungarian)
- A Magyar Bridzs Szövetség új honlapja (in Hungarian)
