= Chazen (surname) =

Chazen is a surname. It is Jewish in origin, from the Yiddish word khazn (cantor in a synagogue). Notable people with the surname include:

- Adam Chazen (born 1986), American special effects producer
- Bernie Chazen (1942–2009), American bridge player
- Debbie Chazen (born 1971), English actress
- Jerome Chazen (1927–2022), American businessman
- Stephen Chazen (1946–2022), American businessman
