= Norwegian Bridge Federation =

National body for bridge in Norway

The Norwegian Bridge Federation (Norwegian: Norsk Bridgeforbund, NBF) founded in 1932, is the national body for bridge in Norway.

The Norwegian Bridge Federation was founded by Inga and Odd Arnesen on 29 January 1932 ; at that time it had three member clubs. Another national bridge organisation had been founded on 30 November 1931 by Wilhelm Nickelsen; by mutual agreement, this was merged into what is now the NBF in April 1932.

It currently has 380 member clubs, divided into 25 circuits. The federation is a member of the European Bridge League, which in turn is a member organisation of the World Bridge Federation, and is also a member of the Norwegian Mind Sports Federation (Norsk Tankesportforbund). As of 2013 it has 9,203 registered members. In 1993, it was decided that the organisation should publish a periodical six times a year; the first issue of Norsk Bridge was published in February 1995, although since 2006 the frequency has been reduced to four times a year.

The organisation's office is at Ullevaal Stadion. Since 2016, the president has been Kari-Anne Opsal The vice-president is Astrid Lybæk. The general secretary is Allan Livgård.

== Administration ==
Presidents	from	to
Anton Midsem	1932	1934
Johannes Brun	1934	1937
Oluf Aall	1937	1939
Wilhelm Schibbye	1939	1945
Niels Marius Nielsen	1945	1950
Karl Fr. Dawes	1950	1954
Ranik Halle	1954	1964
Bjørn Larsen	1964	1967
Ambjørg Amundsen	1967	1971
Baard Baardsen	1971	1975
Knut Koppang	1975	1977
Bjørn Larsen	1977	1979
Finn Søderstrøm	1979	1981
Ole Smestad	1981	1983
Arild H. Johansen	1983	1987
Hans Jørgen Bakke	1987	1988
Jakob Madsen	1988	1991
Per Bryde Sundseth	1991	1993
Arild H. Johansen	1993	1995
Helge Stanghelle	1995	1996
Jan Aasen	1996	2004
Helge Stanghelle	2004	2008
Jan Aasen	2008	2014
Jostein Sørvoll	2014	2016
Kari-Anne Opsal	2016

== Bridge in Norway ==
Norway is one of the top nations in bridge; the country won the world team championship in 2007, the NBF's 75th anniversary year, took silver in 1993 and 2001, and bronze in 1997, and in 2008 at the first World Mind Sports Games in Beijing won more medals than any other nation, two gold, one silver and three bronze. However, despite a "massive recruiting effort under the auspices of the NBF", the game attracts few young people and the average age of bridge club members is rising.

== See also ==
- World Bridge Federation
- List of bridge federations
- Norwegian contract bridge players
