= Leventritt Silver Ribbon Pairs =

Seniors bridge competition named for Peter Leventritt

The Leventritt Silver Ribbon Pairs national bridge championship is held at the spring American Contract Bridge League (ACBL) North American Bridge Championship (NABC).

The Leventritt Silver Ribbon Pairs is a four session matchpoint (MP) pairs event with two qualifying and two final sessions. The event typically starts on the first Sunday of the NABC.

== History ==
The Silver Ribbon Pairs is an event open only to players who are at least 55 years old and who have pre-qualified by placing first or second in a regional or national-rated senior event.

The Silver Ribbon Pairs consists of two qualifying and two final sessions. The winners will have their names inscribed on the Leventritt Trophy and will receive a certificate of recognition.

The trophy honors Peter Leventritt of New York, ACBL president in 1954 and assistant treasurer 1945–46. He served as president of the Greater New York Bridge Association and the Card School of New York, which he co-founded. Leventritt (1915–1997) pioneered the use of the Schenken System in partnership with its inventor, Howard Schenken. He represented North America in the Bermuda Bowl and placed second in 1957, 1961, 1963 and 1965.

== Winners ==
Winners of Leventritt Silver Ribbon Pairs
Year	Winners	Runners-up
1992	James Leary, S. Irving Steinfeldt	George Rosenkranz, Fred Hamilton
1993	Joan Remey Moore, Helen Shanbrom	Corinne Kirkham, Jim Kirkham
1994	Virgil Anderson, Jayne Thomas	Betty Wilton, Herb Wilton
1995	Gene Freed, Peter Benjamin	Lloyd Loux, Marge Cox
1996	Phil Karani, Martin Hoffman	Ed Lewis, Frank King
1997	Chuck Said, John Russell	Becky Rogers, Nell Cahn
1998	Eli Borok, Bill Sides	Dudley Brown, Richard Budd
1999	Jim Kirkham, Corinne Kirkham	Gerald Caravelli, Godfrey Chang
2000	Rhoda Walsh, Charles Coon	Gerald Caravelli, Marc Low
2001	Fred Hamilton, Steve Catlett	Ethan Stein, Gerald Caravelli
2002	Marilyn Hemenway, Mike Albert	Diane Shannon, Donald Rothschild
2003	Roger Lord, Alan Popkin	John Russell, Bernace DeYoung
2004	Joseph Godefrin, Ed Schulte	Jerry Premo, G. Gard Hays
2005	Marla Chaikin, Bill Esberg	John Zilic, Thomas Peters
2006	Lew Finkel, Gaylor Kasle	William Esberg, Marla Chaikin
2007	Allan Siebert, Alan Stout	Charles Nemes, Martin Morris
2008	Sheldon Kirsch, Morrie Kleinplatz	Gaylor Kasle, Lew Finkel
2009	Dan Suty, Jim Hilton	Gaylor Kasle, Lew Finkel
2010	Gloria Bart, Les Bart	Rob Crawford, Hadi Allahverdian
2011	Richard DeMartino, John Stiefel	Tom Kniest, Don Stack
2012	Fred Hamilton, Jim Sternberg	Lloyd Arvedon, Sheila Gabay
2013	Mike Cappelletti, Richard Wieland	Richard Brown, Hugh Brown Jr.
2014	Bernie Yomtov, Allen Hawkins	Allan Siebert, Don Caton
2015	Bruce Noda, Mark Ralph	Les Bart, Gloria Bart
2016	Dave Westfall, Craig Zastera	Mark Cohen, Bill Pollack
2017	David Hampton, Bill Marshall	Don Lowry, Hal Montgomery
2018	Michael Heymann, Richard Chan	Gail Greenberg, Jeff Hand
2019	Peter Gelfand, Mark itabashi	Craig Biddle, Bernie Greenspan
2024	Craig Robinson, Robert Fendrick	Stephen Sanborn, Kerri Sanborn
