= Brazilian Bridge Federation =

National organization for bridge in Brazil

The Brazilian Bridge Federation (Portuguese: Federação Brasileira de Bridge) is the national organization for bridge in Brazil and a member of the Confederacion Sudamericana de Bridge and the World Bridge Federation. It was founded in 1945 as the Confederação Brasileira de Bridge (Brazilian Bridge Confederation), affiliated with the World Bridge Federation in 1979, and fully recognized by it in June 1999.

The organization is based in Rio de Janeiro. Its president is Francisco de Assis Chagas de Mello e Silva and its vice president is Jeovani Salomão. Ernesto d’Orsi was president from 1983 to 2001 and is now president emeritus. As of 2013 it has 1,194 members. Relatively few people play bridge in Brazil, approximately 40,000 or between 40,000 and 50,000.

== See also ==
- World Bridge Federation
- List of bridge federations
- Brazilian contract bridge players
