= List of contract bridge governing bodies =

The World Bridge Federation (WBF) is the international governing body for contract bridge.

Emulating the organizational concepts of the Olympic movement and its signature five rings, the World Bridge Federation encompasses the five continents (America, Europe, Africa, Asia and Oceania) represented by eight geographic Zonal Conferences. Each Zonal Conference consists of member countries as represented by their respective National Bridge Organization.

== International and multi-national ==
Federation	Acronym	WBF Zone	Seat	Countries	Members	Website
World Bridge Federation	WBF		Switzerland	112		www.worldbridge.org
European Bridge League	EBL	1	Switzerland	46	351,112	www.eurobridge.org
North American Bridge Federation	NABF	2	United States	3	124,909	
American Contract Bridge League	ACBL		United States	3	> 146,770	www.acbl.org
South American Bridge Federation (Spanish: Confederación Sudamericana de Bridge)	CSB	3		10	2,894	www.confsudbridge.org
Bridge Federation of Asia & the Middle East	BFAME	4		11	7,307	www.bfame.org
Central American & Caribbean Bridge Federation	CACABF	5		14	605	
Asia Pacific Bridge Federation	APBF	6		12	96,794	www.pabf.org
South Pacific Bridge Federation	SPBF	7	New Zealand	4	48,385	www.southpacbridge.org
African Bridge Federation	ABF	8	Egypt	12	4,594	w ww.africanbridgefederation.net

Note: member numbers as of 2021 (source: WBF website)

== National ==
=== Europe ===
European Bridge League
Country	Organization	Acronym	Website
Albania	Albanian Bridge Federation	ALBF	www.albaniabridge.com
Austria	Austrian Bridge Federation (German: Österreichischer Bridgesportverband)	ÖBV	www.bridgeaustria.at
Belarus	Belarus Contract Bridge Union (Bulgarian: Белорусский союз спортивного бриджа)	BCBU	www.bridgeby.org/
Belgium	Royal Belgian Bridge Federation	RBBF	www.rbbf.be
Bosnia and Herzegovina	Bosnia and Herzegovina Bridge Federation	BHBF	
Bulgaria	Bulgarian Bridge Federation	BuBF	www.bridge.bg
Croatia	Croatian Bridge Federation (Croatian: Hrvatski Bridž Savez)	CrBF	bridge.hr
Cyprus	Cyprus Bridge Federation (Greek: Κυπριακή Ομοσπονδία Μπριτζ)	CyBF	www.cyprusbridge.org
Czech Republic	Czech Bridge Federation (Czech: Český bridžový svaz)	CzBF	www.bridge.cz/cbs/
Denmark	Danish Bridge Federation (Danish: Danmarks Bridgeforbund)	DBf	www.bridge.dk
England	English Bridge Union	EBU	www.ebu.co.uk
Estonia	Estonian Tournament Bridge League (Estonian: Eesti Turniiribridžiliit)	ETBF	www.bridge.ee
Faroe Islands	Faroese Bridge Federation (Faroese: Føroya Bridgesamband)	FBS	www.bridge.fo
Finland	Bridge League of Finland (Finnish: Suomen Bridgeliitto)	SBL	www.bridgefinland.fi
France	French Bridge Federation (French: Fédération Française de Bridge)	FFB	www.ffbridge.asso.fr
Georgia	Georgian Bridge Federation	GBF	
Germany	German Bridge Federation (German: Deutscher Bridge-Verband)	DBV	www.bridge-verband.de
Greece	Greek Bridge Federation (Greek: Ελληνική Ομοσπονδία Μπριτζ)	ΕΟΜ	www.hellasbridge.org
Hungary	Hungarian Bridge Federation (Hungarian: Magyar Bridzs Szövetség)	MBSZ	bridzs.hu
Iceland	Icelandic Bridge Federation (Icelandic: Bridgesamband Íslands)	BI	www.bridge.is
Ireland (Note: The IBU is a federation of the Contract Bridge Association of Ireland (CBAI, Republic of Ireland) and Northern Ireland Bridge Union (NIBU, Northern Ireland) which compete separately in some competitions including the Camrose Trophy.)	Irish Bridge Union	IBU	cbai.ie/i-b-u/i-b-u-overview/
Israel	Israel Bridge Federation (Hebrew: התאגדות ישראלית לברידג')	IBF	www.bridge.co.il
Italy	Italian Bridge Federation (Italian: Federazione Italiana Gioco Bridge)	FIGB	www.federbridge.it
Latvia	Latvian Bridge Federation (Latvian: Latvijas Bridža Federācija)	LBF	www.bridge.lv
Lebanon	Lebanese Bridge Federation (French: Fédération Libanaise de Bridge)	FLB	bridgeliban.com
Lithuania	Lithuanian Bridge Association (Lithuanian: Lietuvos Sportinio Bridžo Asociacija)	LBA	www.sportbridge.lt
Luxembourg	Luxembourg Bridge Federation (French: Fédération Luxembourgeoise de Bridge)	FLuB	www.bridge.lu
Malta	Malta Bridge Association	MBA	www.maltabridgeassociation.com
Monaco	Monegasque Bridge Federation (French: Fédération Monégasque de Bridge)	FMB	www.federation-bridge.mc
Netherlands	Dutch Bridge Federation (Dutch: Nederlandse Bridge Bond)	NBB	www.bridge.nl
Norway	Norwegian Bridge Federation (Norwegian: Norsk Bridgeforbund)	NBF	www.bridge.no
Poland	Polish Bridge Union (Polish: Polski Związek Brydża Sportowego)	PBU	www.pzbs.pl
Portugal	Portuguese Bridge Federation (Portuguese: Federação Portuguesa de Bridge)	FPB	www.fpbridge.webs.com
Romania	Romanian Bridge Federation (Romanian: Federația Română de Bridge)	FRB	www.frbridge.ro
Russia	Russian Bridge Federation (Russian: Федерация спортивного бриджа России)	ФСБР	www.bridgesport.ru
Scotland	Scottish Bridge Union	SBU	www.sbu.org.uk
Serbia	Bridge Association of Serbia (Serbian: Bridž Savez Srbije)	BSS	www.bridgeserbia.org
Slovakia	Slovak Bridge Association (Slovak: Slovenský bridžový zväz)	SvBF	www.bridgeclub.sk
Slovenia	Slovenia Bridge Federation (Slovene: Bridge Zveza Slovenije)	BZS	www.bridge-zveza.si
Spain	Spanish Bridge Association (Spanish: Asociación Española de Bridge)	AEB	www.aebridge.com
San Marino	San Marino National Bridge Federation (Italian: Federazione Nazionale Sammarinese Bridge)	BFSM	
Sweden	Swedish Bridge Federation (Swedish: Svenska Bridgeförbundet)	SBF	www.svenskbridge.se
Switzerland	Swiss Bridge Federation (French: Fédération Suisse de Bridge)	FSB	www.fsbridge.ch
Turkey	Turkish Bridge Federation (Turkish: Türkíye Bríç Federasyonu)	TBF	www.tbricfed.org.tr
Ukraine	Ukrainian Bridge Federation	UBF	
Wales	Welsh Bridge Union	WBU	welshbridgeunion.org

=== North America ===
American Contract Bridge League
Country	Organization	Acronym	Website
Canada	Canadian Bridge Federation	CBF	www.cbf.ca
Mexico	Mexican Bridge Federation (Spanish: Federacion Mexicana de Bridge)	FMB	
United States	United States Bridge Federation	USBF	www.usbf.org

=== South America ===
Confederación Sudamericana de Bridge
Country	Organization	Acronym	Website
Argentina	Argentine Bridge Association (Spanish: Asociación del Bridge Argentino)	ABA	www.aba.org.ar
Bolivia	Bolivian Bridge Association (Spanish: Asociación Boliviana de Bridge)	ABB	
Brazil	Brazilian Bridge Federation (Portuguese: Federação Brasileira de Bridge)	BBF	www.bridge.esp.br
Chile	Chilean Bridge Association (Spanish: Federación Chilena de Bridge)	FChB	www.fcb.cl
Colombia	Colombian Bridge Association (Spanish: Federación de Clubes de Bridge de Colombia)	FCB	
Ecuador	Ecuadorian Bridge Federation	FEB	
Paraguay	Paraguayan Bridge Association (Spanish: Asociación Paraguaya de Bridge)	APrB	
Peru	Peruvian Bridge Federation (Spanish: Federación Deportiva Peruana de Bridge)	FDPB	
Uruguay	Uruguayan Bridge Association (Spanish: Asociación Uruguaya de Bridge)	AUB	www.aubridge.org
Venezuela	Venezuelan Bridge Federation (Spanish: Federación Venezolana de Bridge)	FVB	www.bridgevenezuela.com

=== Asia and Middle East ===
Bridge Federation of Asia & the Middle East
Country	Organization	Acronym	Website
Bahrain	Bahrain Bridge Committee	BBC	
Bangladesh	Bangladesh Bridge Federation	BngBF	www.bbf-bd.com
India	Bridge Federation of India	BFI	bfi.net.in
Jordan	Jordan Bridge Federation (Arabic: للإتحاد الأردني للبردج)	JBA	www.jordanbridgefederation.com
Kuwait	Kuwait Mind Sports Association	KMSA	
Pakistan	Pakistan Bridge Federation	PBF	
Palestine	Palestine Bridge Federation	PaBF	
Qatar	Qatar Bridge Association	QBA	
Sri Lanka	Bridge Federation of Sri Lanka	BFSL	
Syria	Syrian Bridge Association	SBA	
United Arab Emirates	United Arab Emirates Bridge Federation	UAEBF	

=== Central America and the Caribbean ===
Central American and Caribbean Bridge Federation
Country	Organization	Acronym	Website
Barbados	Barbados Bridge League	BrBL	www.barbadosbridge.org
Bermuda	Bermuda Bridge Federation	BrmBF	www.bermudabridge.com
Costa Rica	Bridge Association of Costa Rica (Spanish: Asociación Recreativa Nacional de Bridge de Costa Rica)	ARNB	
Cuba	Cuba Bridge Association	CBA	
Dominica	Dominica Bridge Federation	DBF	
Grenada	Grenada Bridge Federation	GrBF	
Guadeloupe	Guadeloupe Bridge Federation (French: Comité de Bridge de Guadeloupe)	GuBF	
Guatemala	Guatemala Bridge Association (Spanish: Asociación Guatemalteca de Bridge)	AGB	
Jamaica	Jamaica Bridge Association	JaBA	
Martinique	Martinique Bridge District (French: District de Bridge de la Martinique)	DBM	
Panama	Panama Bridge Association (Spanish: Asociación Panamena de Bridge)	APnB	
Suriname	Suriname Bridge League (Dutch: Surinaamse Bridge Bond)	SBB	
Trinidad and Tobago	Trinidad & Tobago Contract Bridge Association	TTCBA	www.bridgewebs.com/trinidadtobago
United States Virgin Islands	Virgin Islands Bridge Federation	VIBF	

=== Asia Pacific ===
Asia Pacific Bridge Federation
Country / Region	Organization	Acronym	Website
China	Chinese Contract Bridge Association (Chinese: 中国桥牌网)	CCBA	www.ccba.org.cn
Hong Kong, China	Hong Kong, China Contract Bridge Association Limited	HKCBA	www.hkcba.org
Macau	Macau Contract Bridge Association	MCBA	
Chinese Taipei	Chinese Taipei Contract Bridge Association	CTCBA	www.ctcba.org.tw
Indonesia	Indonesian Contract Bridge Association (Indonesian: Gabungan Bridge Seluruh Indonesia)	IBA	gabsi.web.id
Japan	Japan Contract Bridge League Inc	JCBL	www.jcbl.or.jp
South Korea	Korea Contract Bridge League (Korean: 한국 브리지 협회)	KCBL	www.kcbl.org
Malaysia	Malaysian Contract Bridge Association	MCBA	www.mcba.org.my
Philippines	Philippine Tournament Bridge Association	PTBA	
Singapore	Singapore Contract Bridge Association	SCBA	www.scba.org.sg
Thailand	Contract Bridge League of Thailand	CBLT	
Timor-Leste	Timor Leste Contract Bridge Federation	TLCBA	

=== South Pacific ===
South Pacific Bridge Federation
Country	Organization	Acronym	Website
Australia	Australian Bridge Federation	ABF	www.abf.com.au
French Polynesia	Bridge Federation of French Polynesia (French: Fédération de Bridge de Polynésie Française)	FBPF	www.bridge.pf
New Caledonia	New Caledonia Bridge Federation	NCBF	
New Zealand	New Zealand Bridge Inc.	NZB	www.nzbridge.co.nz

=== Africa ===
African Bridge Federation
Country	Organization	Acronym	Website
Botswana	Botswana Bridge Federation	BtBF	
Cameroon	Cameroon Bridge Association	CBA	
Egypt	Egyptian Bridge Federation	EBF	www.egyptbridge.org
Kenya	Kenya Bridge Association	KBA	
Madagascar	Malagasy Bridge Federation (French: Fédération Malgache de Bridge)	FMaB	
Morocco	Royal Moroccan Bridge Federation (French: Fédération Royale Marocaine de Bridge)	FRMB	www.frmbridge.ma
Nigeria	Nigerian Bridge Association	NBA	
Réunion	Reunion Bridge District (French: District de Bridge de la Réunion)	DBR	www.district-bridge-reunion.fr
South Africa	South African Bridge Federation	SABF	www.sabf.co.za
Tunisia	Tunisian Bridge Federation (French: Fédération Tunisienne de Bridge)	FTB	
Zambia	Zambia Bridge Federation	ZBF	
Zimbabwe	Zimbabwe Bridge Union	ZBU	
