= Zeke Jabbour =

American bridge player (1928–2023)

- Born: Azeez Jabbour; November 4, 1928; Youngstown, Ohio, U.S.
- Died: January 7, 2023 (aged 94)
- Occupation: Bridge player, writer

Azeez "Zeke" Jabbour (November 4, 1928 – January 7, 2023) was a professional American bridge player and writer from Boca Raton, Florida.

Jabbour was born in Youngstown, Ohio. He died after a long battle with Parkinson's disease on January 7, 2023, at the age of 94.

== Bridge accomplishments ==
=== Awards ===
- Fishbein Trophy (1) 1989
- Barry Crane Top 500 (1) 1989

=== Wins ===
- North American Bridge Championships (8)
  - Truscott Senior Swiss Teams (2) 1998, 2001
  - Senior Knockout Teams (6) 1994, 1995, 1996, 1998, 2001, 2002

=== Runners-up ===
- North American Bridge Championships
  - Nail Life Master Open Pairs (1) 1979
  - Truscott Senior Swiss Teams (1) 2002
  - Senior Knockout Teams (2) 1997, 2007
  - Mitchell Board-a-Match Teams (1) 1979
