= Meyer Kotkin =

American bridge player (1955–2024)

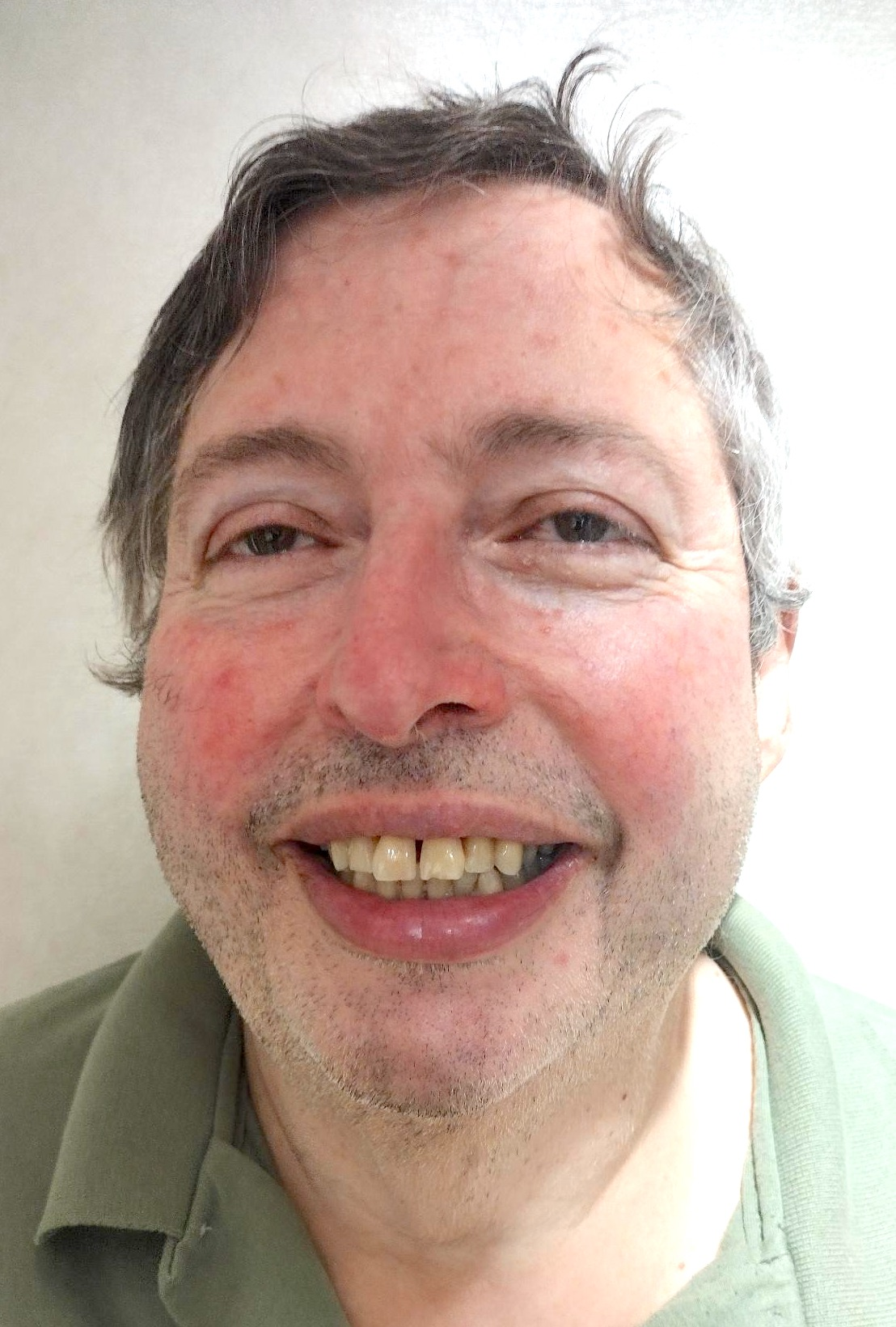
- Kotkin in 2022
- Born: February 26, 1955; New York City, New York, U.S.
- Died: August 12, 2024 (aged 69)

Meyer H. Kotkin (February 26, 1955 – August 12, 2024) was an American bridge player who was North American champion and an American Contract Bridge League (ACBL) Grand Life Master.

== Bridge accomplishments ==
=== Wins ===
- North American Bridge Championships (2)
  - Wernher Open Pairs (1) 2011
  - Truscott Senior Swiss Teams (1) 2022

== Personal life and death ==
Meyer was married with two children. He died on August 12, 2024.
