= American Bridge Association =

Tournament bridge organization

The American Bridge Association (ABA) is a tournament bridge organization in the United States of America.

== Origins ==
The ABA was formed in 1932 by black tennis players at Buckroe Beach, Virginia; at the time, blacks were excluded from most bridge events.

The desire to compete in the sport of tennis despite the racial barriers of the time resulted in the creation of the American Tennis Association in 1916. The Association often held its matches on college campuses such as Hampton Institute, now Hampton University, and Lincoln University, where adequate facilities were available. One such championship event was held at Hampton in the year 1932. At the conclusion of the tournament, a group of tennis players, who were also bridge enthusiasts, suggested having a duplicate bridge match in the evening as a form of relaxation. This event, coupled with impetus from the Cromwell School of Contract Bridge in New York City, marked the beginning of the American Bridge Association. Dr. M.E. DuBisette became the first president of the ABA and the first National Bridge Tournament was held in Buckroe Beach, Virginia in 1933.

== Growth ==
The membership of the newly formed ABA burgeoned, and in 1936 the ABA merged with the Eastern Bridge League, a group of New York City bridge clubs. Since this time the ABA has evolved into eight sections - Eastern, Great Lakes, Mid-Atlantic, Southern, Southwestern, Midwestern, Western, and Northwestern.

As the ABA continued to grow, attention focused on the need for a permanent home. The ideal of a permanent location was accomplished when a building, which now houses the ABA National Office and ABA memorabilia, was purchased in Atlanta, Georgia in 1994. In the 1980s, the American Bridge Association selected the Schomburg Center in New York City to officially house its memorabilia. The ABA National Headquarters showcases artifacts and catalogs ABA documents. In 2005, the American Bridge Association published Defining Moments, a historical package which includes a written chronicle, DVD of oral history, and playing cards. These components depict the movements, forces, and people who helped shape the history of the ABA. The entire package or its components may be obtained from the ABA National Headquarters in Atlanta, Georgia.

In 1967, the American Contract Bridge League (ACBL) removed the final obstacle to ACBL membership for African-Americans when it included in its by-laws a rule that no person could be denied membership because of race, color, or creed. Historically, many states, particularly in the South, had laws that made card-playing between blacks and whites illegal. Some of those were: Texas, Tennessee, Mississippi, Alabama, and Huntsville, Alabama.

The ABA membership remains predominantly African-American. It holds two national tournaments each year.

The ABA has its own masterpoints system, similar to the ACBL masterpoints system.

== See also ==
- American Contract Bridge League
- United States Bridge Federation
