= Arnie Fisher =

American bridge player

Arnold (Arnie) H. Fisher (born 1938) is an American professional bridge player, bridge author, university instructor and businessman. He is from Clementon, New Jersey and graduated from University of Pennsylvania.

== Bridge accomplishments ==
=== Wins ===
- North American Bridge Championships (7)
  - Truscott Senior Swiss Teams (3) 1998, 2001, 2003
  - Senior Knockout Teams (3) 1998, 2001, 2002
  - Keohane North American Swiss Teams (1) 1996

=== Runners-up ===
- North American Bridge Championships
  - Rockwell Mixed Pairs (1) 1996
  - Truscott Senior Swiss Teams (1) 2002
  - Senior Knockout Teams (3) 1997, 2006, 2009
