= Truscott Senior Swiss Teams =

North American bridge championship

The Truscott/USPC Senior Swiss Teams North American bridge championship is held at the summer American Contract Bridge League (ACBL) North American Bridge Championship (NABC).

The Truscott/USPC Senior Swiss Teams is a four session Swiss teams, two qualifying sessions and two final sessions. The event typically starts on the first Monday of the NABC. The event is open to players 65 or older.

== History ==
The Truscott/USPC Senior Swiss Teams is an event for four to six players in which participants must be 65 or older to compete. There is a one-day (two sessions) qualifying and a second day (also two sessions) final. Scoring is by International Match Points (IMPs) converted to Victory Points. Scores from the two qualifying sessions are converted to a carryover and added to the teams' total in the final two sessions.

The trophy for the contest, named in memory of ACBL Hall of Fame member and former bridge editor of The New York Times Alan Truscott, was put into play in 2006 by the United States Playing Card Company.

== Winners ==
Winners of Truscott/USPC Senior Swiss Teams
Year	Winners	Runners-up
1997	Harry Ross, John Gustafson, Helen Gustafson, Jerry Gaer, Marilyn Hemenway, Mike Albert	Steve Lawrence, Bob Luebkeman, Ed Groner, Richard Holmes
1998	Mike Levine, Zeke Jabbour, Richard Reisig, Fred Hamilton, Arnie Fisher, P.O. Sundelin	Jim Barrow, John Wong, Paul Stern, Wayne Hascall
1999	Corinne Kirkham, Jim Kirkham, Richard Potter, John Potter, Marc Low, Sandra Low	Jim Barrow, Ed Lewis, James Murphy, David Adams, Randy Pettit, Allan Siebert
2000	Trudi Nugit, Hamish Bennett, Gene Simpson, Mike Shuman	Nels Erickson, Edwin Malmuth, Gerald Bare, Michael Savage, Rick Henderson
2001	Mike Levine, P.O. Sundelin, Zeke Jabbour, Arnie Fisher, Randy Pettit, Allan Siebert	Thomas Smith, Richard DeMartino, John Sutherlin, Ron Gerard
2002	Roger Clough, Rebecca Clough, Louise Freed, Gene Freed, Derrell Childs, Nels Erickson	Mike Levine, Zeke Jabbour, Russell Arnold, Arnold Fisher, Randy Pettit, Allan Siebert
2003	Carolyn Bjorklund, Fred Hamilton, Ed Barlow, Evan Bailey, Arnie Fisher	Aram Bedros, Leo Bell, David Lindop, Marshall Miles
2004	Hamish Bennett, Gene Simpson, Bruce Noda, Fran Dickman, Mike Shuman	Fred Hamilton, Ira Rubin, Grace Hunt, David Adams, Chuck Said
2005	Jerry Bare, Gene Freed, Jim Murphy, Mike Savage	Grace Hunt, John Sutherlin, Nancy Passell, Fred Hamilton, Thomas Peters, John Zilic
2006	Geof Brod, Steve Earl, Richard DeMartino, John Stiefel	Michael Mikyska, Catherine Podolsky, Phil Schaefer, Nell Schaefer
2007	Geof Brod, Richard DeMartino, John Stiefel, Pat McDevitt	Jeffrey Hand, David Butler, Joseph Godefrin, Ed Schulte, Larry Bausher, Steve Becker
2008	Allan Graves, Reanette Frobouck, Mark Lair, John Carruthers, Fred Hamilton	Geof Brod, Richard DeMartino, John Stiefel, Pat McDevitt
2009	Karen Allison, Lea Dupont, Benito Garozzo, Mike Ledeen	Robert Bitterman, Jerry Helms, Tom Rutledge, Bill Wisdom
2010	Kenneth L. Cohen, Ken Cohen, Rick Rowland, Neal Satten, Thomas Weik	Richard Budd, Daniel Colatosti, Mel Colchamiro, Sheila Gabay, John Malley
2011	Leonard Melander, Mark Dahl, Mary Oshlag, Richard Oshlag	Stan Tulin, Marc Jacobus, Eddie Wold, Roger Bates
2012	Bob Heller, Robert Fendrick, John Herriot, Larry Harding	Martin Scheinberg, Billy Eisenberg, Howard Perlman, Jeffrey Starr, Paul Trent, Sandra Trent
2013	Dee Adams, Al Stone, Fred Hamilton, Mark Itabashi, Dan Morse, John Sutherlin	Ed White, Cam Doner, Jan Zadroga, Kazimierz Omernik
2014	Stephen McConnell, Warren Cederborg, Dick Bruno, Robert Gardner, Jeff Schuett, Kerry Smith	James Griffin, Ira Hessel, Joe Quinn, Steve Shirey
2015	Haven Sharaf, Bill Irvine, Robert Lurie, John Hrones Jr, Melvin Marcus, Rena Lieberman	Rick Roeder, John Jones, Peter Rank, Lynne Feldman
2016	Glenn Eisenstein, Richard Reitman, John Rengstorff, Geoffrey Brod	James Krekorian, Robert Blanchard, Mark Itabashi, Douglas Doub, Paul Lewis, Linda Lewis
2017	Bob Glasson, Joann Glasson, Rick Rowland, Martin Rabinowtiz	Stephen Nellissen, Bob Gwirtzman, Stephen Mackay, James Priebe
2022	Alexander Allen, Meyer Kotkin, Abe Pineles, Daniel Boye	Haig Tchamitch, Billy Cohen, Wlodzimierz Starkowski, Michal Kwiecien
2023	Ross Grabel, Michael Penick, Hemant Lall, Iftikhar Baqai	John Jones, Leo Bell, Rick Roeder, Crispin Barrere
2024	Barry Bragin, Robert Cappelli, Mark Laken, Mark Aquino	Rick Binder, Mel Colchamiro, Jack Lipson, Alan Watson
2025	Peter Weichsel, Sam Lev, Fred Chang, James Krekorian	Marty Seligman, Mark Lair, Wlodzimierz Starkowski, Michal Kwiecien

== Sources ==
"ACBL - NABC Winners: Truscott USPC Senior Swiss". acbl.com. ACBL. "ACBL - NABC Winners". acbl.com. ACBL. Archived from the original on 4 February 2012.

List of previous winners, Page 8 Daily Bulletin (PDF), vol. 80–4, July 21, 2008, archived from the original (PDF) on April 2, 2015

2008 winners, Page 1 Daily Bulletin (PDF), vol. 80–6, July 23, 2008
