= Abe Pineles =

American bridge player

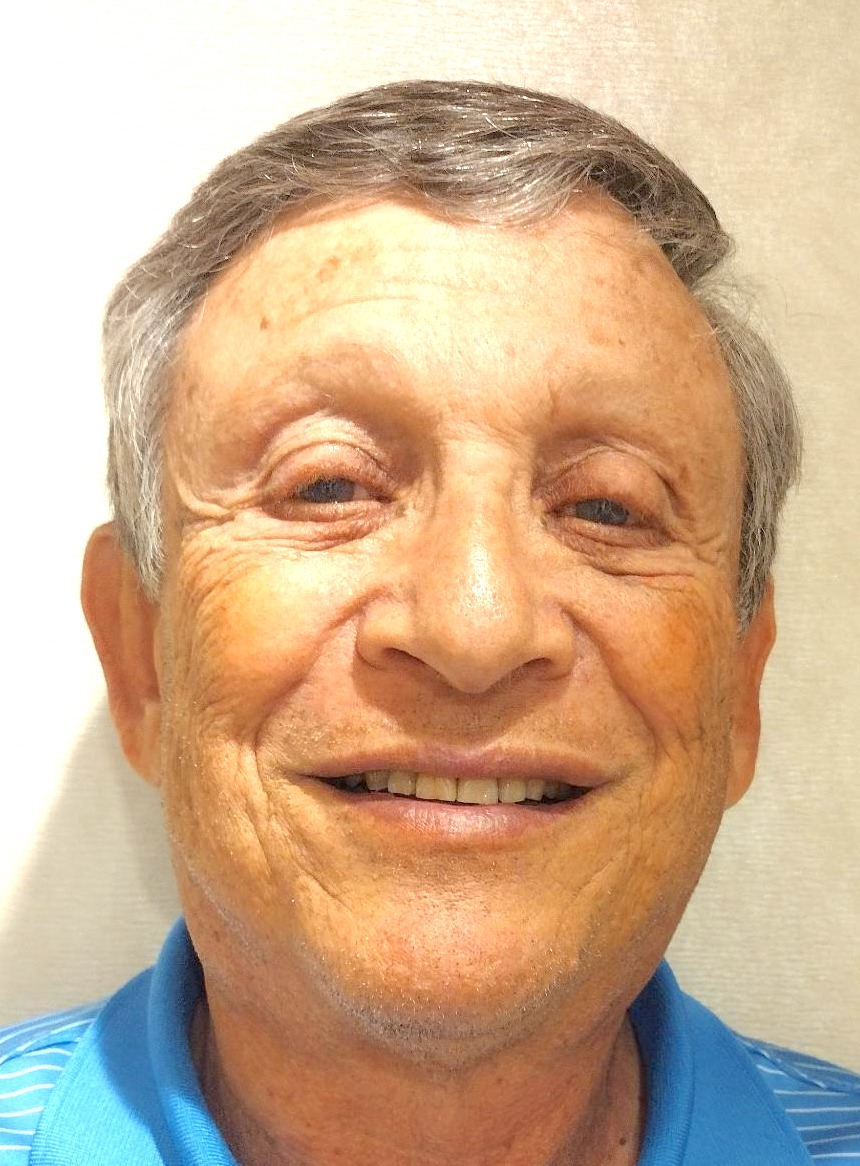
- Born: 1948 (age 76–77); Munich, Germany

Abe Pineles is an American North American champion bridge player and an American Contract Bridge League (ACBL) Grand Life Master.

== Bridge accomplishments ==
=== Wins ===
- North American Bridge Championships (1)
  - Truscott Senior Swiss Teams (1) 2022

== Personal life ==
Abe is married to Greta. They have two daughters.
