= World Senior Pairs Championship =

Part of the World Bridge Championships

The World Senior Pairs Championship is one of the competitions held as part of the quadrennial World Bridge Championships (formerly World Pairs Olympiad), inaugurated at the 8th rendition of the meet in 1990.

Prior to 2005 both members of each pair had to be at least 55 years of age. In 2005, the World Bridge Federation (WBF) decided that the minimum age for a player to be recognized as Senior would be increasing one year per year, until it reached 60 years in 2010. The decision ensured that 55-year-olds who participated in a senior event in 2003 would never become ex-Seniors.

== Results ==
World meets commonly run for 15 days on a schedule whose details vary.

In 2006 the Senior Pairs played Tuesday to Friday, the 11th to 14th days of the meet, after completion of all teams competition for seniors. There were eight sessions with 103 pairs on the first two days, 98 on the third, and 88 on the fourth.

In seven renditions of the Senior Pairs through 2014, no player has won more than one medal.

Year	Entries		Medalists	
1990	(Note: For 1990 to 1998, the WBF currently lists some number of leaders (28 in 1990), perhaps the number of finalists. Beginning 2002 the listings seem to enumerate the field.)	1.	(United Kingdom) Albert Dormer	(United Kingdom) Alan Hiron
		2.	(Netherlands) Kees Kaiser	(Netherlands) Jaap Kokkes
		3.	(Austria) Franz Baratta	(Austria) Karl Rohan
1994		1.	(United States) Hamish Bennett	(United States) Fred Hamilton
		2.	(United States) Simon Kantor	(United States) Murray Melton
		3.	(Canada) Duncan Phillips	(Canada) Bill Solomon
1998		1.	(United Kingdom) Irving Gordon	(United Kingdom) Boris Schapiro
		2.	(United States) Lea Dupont	(United States) Benito Garozzo
		3.	(Germany) Burghard von Alvensleben	(Germany) Walter Höger
2002	71	1.	(Bulgaria) Christo Drumev	(Bulgaria) Ivan Tanev
		2.	(Canada) Bruce Gowdy	(Canada) Arno Hobart
	(Note: This does not match the WBF listing as of August 2011, but WBF evidently confuses Laurie Vogel of Germany (Vogel–Mohanram) with Laurie Vogel of USA (Vogel–Greenberg?) and Claude Vogel of USA (Vogel–Mohan), crediting the former with simultaneous entry in multiple events. Laurie Vogel, GER and others.)	3.	(United States) Sangarapil Mohan	(United States) Claude Vogel
2006	103	1.	(Netherlands) Nico Klaver	(Netherlands) Roald Ramer
		2.	(Poland) Aleksander Jezioro	(Poland) Julian Klukowski
		3.	(Germany) Reiner Marsal	(Germany) Entscho Wladow
2010	66	1.	(United States) Rich DeMartino	(Republic of Ireland) Pat McDevitt
		2.	(Japan) Kyoko Ohno	(Japan) Akihiko Yamada
		3.	(United States) Farid Assemi	(United States) Edward Wojewoda
2014	33 (Note: There were 33 initial entries in 2014, excluding drop-ins from the teams.)	1.	(Indonesia) Henky Lasut	(Indonesia) Eddy Manoppo
		2.	(United States) Hemant Lall	(United States) Reese Milner
		3.	(Poland) Apolinary Kowalski	(Poland) Jacek Romanski

The 2014 silver and bronze medalists Lall–Milner and Kowalski–Romanski were two of three pairs that won the World Senior Teams Championship in the same meet, along with Michel Bessis–Philippe Cronier.

== See also ==
- World Open Pairs Championship
