= P. O. Sundelin =

Swedish bridge player

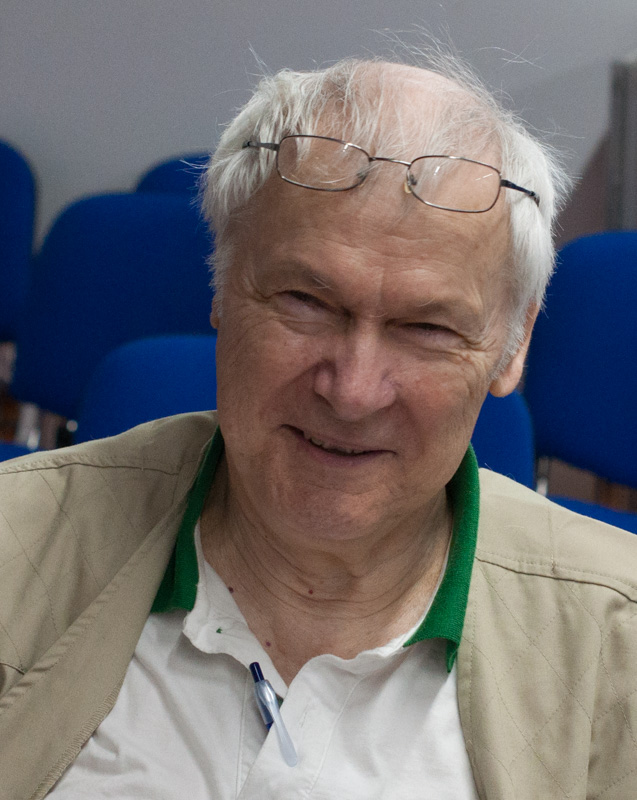
P. O. Sundelin (2014)

Per Olof (P. O.) Sundelin is a Swedish bridge player.

== Bridge accomplishments ==
=== Wins ===
- North American Bridge Championships (6)
  - Senior Knockout Teams (3) 2001, 2002, 2008
  - Nail Life Master Open Pairs (1) 1984
  - Truscott Senior Swiss Teams (2) 1998, 2001

=== Runners-up ===
- North American Bridge Championships (2)
  - Senior Knockout Teams (1) 1997
  - Jacoby Open Swiss Teams (1) 1991
