= Gene Freed =

American bridge player and physician

Eugene Horace Freed (March 18, 1930 – July 17, 2009) was an American bridge player and physician. Freed was a plastic surgeon from Los Angeles, California. He graduated from California State University, San Diego and University of Southern California.

Freed was born in Somerville, New Jersey, and was raised there until his family moved to San Diego when he was about 15. They lived near San Diego State University and he went to college there.

He died from a heart disease at home in Los Angeles.

== Medical practice ==
Freed was a private ear, nose, and throat specialist with "the same office on Wilshire Boulevard" for more than 50 years.

In his medical practice, he treated Maria Callas, Alfred Drake, Larry Fine (one of The Three Stooges), Mario Lanza, Chita Rivera.

Eventually he specialized in evaluations for Workmen's Compensation.

== Bridge accomplishments ==
=== Wins ===
- North American Bridge Championships (6)
  - Lebhar IMP Pairs (2) 1988, 1998
  - Leventritt Silver Ribbon Pairs (1) 1995
  - Truscott Senior Swiss Teams (2) 2002, 2005
  - Mitchell Board-a-Match Teams (1) 1986

=== Runners-up ===
- North American Bridge Championships
  - Senior Knockout Teams (2) 1998, 2006
