= Allan Siebert =

American bridge player

Allan P. Siebert (born 1942) is an American bridge player from Little Rock, Arkansas. On April 18, 2022, he was suspended by the American Contract Bridge League pending a disciplinary hearing. One of his online partners was suspended the same day.

== Bridge accomplishments ==
=== Wins ===
- North American Bridge Championships (6)
  - von Zedtwitz Life Master Pairs (1) 1995
  - Leventritt Silver Ribbon Pairs (1) 2007
  - Truscott Senior Swiss Teams (1) 2001
  - Senior Knockout Teams (1) 2001
  - Keohane North American Swiss Teams (2) 1988, 2003

=== Runners-up ===
- North American Bridge Championships
  - von Zedtwitz Life Master Pairs (1) 1985
  - Leventritt Silver Ribbon Pairs (1) 2014
  - Truscott Senior Swiss Teams (2) 1999, 2002
  - Senior Knockout Teams (2) 2005, 2007
