= 0-10,000 NABC Pairs =

Contract bridge tournament

The 0-10,000 NABC Pairs or 10K NABC Pairs is held at the Summer American Contract Bridge League (ACBL) North American Bridge Championship (NABC).

The 10K NABC Pairs is a four-session matchpoint pairs event with two qualifying sessions and two final sessions. The event is restricted to players with fewer than 10,000 masterpoints.

== History ==
The inaugural 10K NABC Pairs was held in 2014 at the Summer NABC in Las Vegas, Nevada.

== Winners ==
Year	Winners	Runners-up
2014	John Jones, Mark Bartusek	John Hoffman, Leila Sink
2015	Frank Treiber III, Diane Travis	Edward Piken, Viktor Anikovich
2016	David Rodney, Rusty Krauss	Mohsin Chandna, Jay Kelkar
2017	Michael Lipkin, David Gurvich	Pierre Daigneault, Francine Cimon
2018	Phil Clayton, Andrew Gumperz	Edward Piken, Steve Cohen
2019	Robert Kuhnreich, Elliot Sternlicht	Stephen Donahue, David Joyce

== Sources ==
- "ACBL - NABC Winners". acbl.org. ACBL.
- "ACBL Live" acbl.org. ACBL. Retrieved 1 August 2019.
- "NABC Winners" acbl.org. ACBL. Retrieved 1 August 2019
