= Philippine Tournament Bridge Association =

National sports federation of contract bridge in the Philippines

- Sport: Bridge
- Abbreviation: PTBA
- Founded: October 2000
- Affiliation: World Bridge Federation
- Headquarters: Dasmariñas, Makati
- Replaced: Philippine Contract Bridge League
- (founded): 1957
- (Philippines)

The Philippine Tournament Bridge Association (PTBA), is the governing body for the sport of contract bridge in the Philippines. It is recognized by the Philippine Olympic Committee and a member of the World Bridge Federation.

== History ==
The Philippine Tournament Bridge Association (PTBA) traces its roots to the Philippine Contract Bridge League (PCBL) which was established in 1957. The PCBL held five Zonal Championships including the inaugural 1957 Far East Bridge Federation Championships. It also hosted the 1977 Bermuda Bowl in Manila.

In 1999, the PCBL decided to reorganize itself due to issues about its corporate status. The PCBL was succeeded by the Philippine Tournament Bridge Association which was incorporated with Securities and Exchange Commission in October 2000 The World Bridge Federation and Pacific Asia Bridge Federation recognized the new organization. PTBA applied for membership in the Philippine Olympic Committee (POC) in June 2001.

Bridge was later included in multi-sport games. The Philippines took part at the bridge competition at the 2011 SEA Games in Indonesia. At the 2018 Asian Games in Indonesia, bridge was added in the competition calendar. The Philippines competed in bridge.

The PTBA became a regular member of the POC in 2019 with its status elevated from being an associate member.

The association has worked on promoting the game which is traditionally played by the elderly. In 2021, President Winston Arpon has expressed the challenge of promoting the game to a wider audience such as the youth which he says prefers pusoy dos.

== Competitions hosted ==
As the PCBL

- 1957 Far East Bridge Federation Championships
- 1962 Far East Bridge Federation Championships
- 1967 Far East Bridge Federation Championships
- 1974 Far East Bridge Federation Championships
- 1977 Far East Bridge Federation Championships
- 1980 ASEAN Bridge Club Championships
- 1983 ASEAN Bridge Club Championships (moved to Bangkok due to political situation in the Philippines)
- 1988 ASEAN Bridge Club Championships in Makati
- 1995 ASEAN Bridge Club Championships

As the PTBA

- 2001 ASEAN Bridge Club Championships in Makati
- 2003 Pacific Asia Bridge Championships in Makati
- 2008 ASEAN Bridge Club Championships in Makati
- 2011 Southeast Asia Bridge Federation (SEABF) Championships in Makati
- 2011 ASEAN Bridge Club Championship in Makati
