= Bernie Chazen =

American bridge player

Bernie Chazen (1942 – 27 January 2009) was an American bridge player. Chazen was from Tamarac, Florida

== Bridge accomplishments ==
=== Wins ===
- North American Bridge Championships (5)
  - Rockwell Mixed Pairs (2) 1973, 2000
  - Senior Knockout Teams (1) 1999
  - Mitchell Board-a-Match Teams (1) 1971
  - Chicago Mixed Board-a-Match (1) 1984

=== Runners-up ===
- North American Bridge Championships
  - Senior Knockout Teams (1) 2000
  - Spingold (2) 1984, 1987
