= Benito Garozzo =

Italian-American bridge player

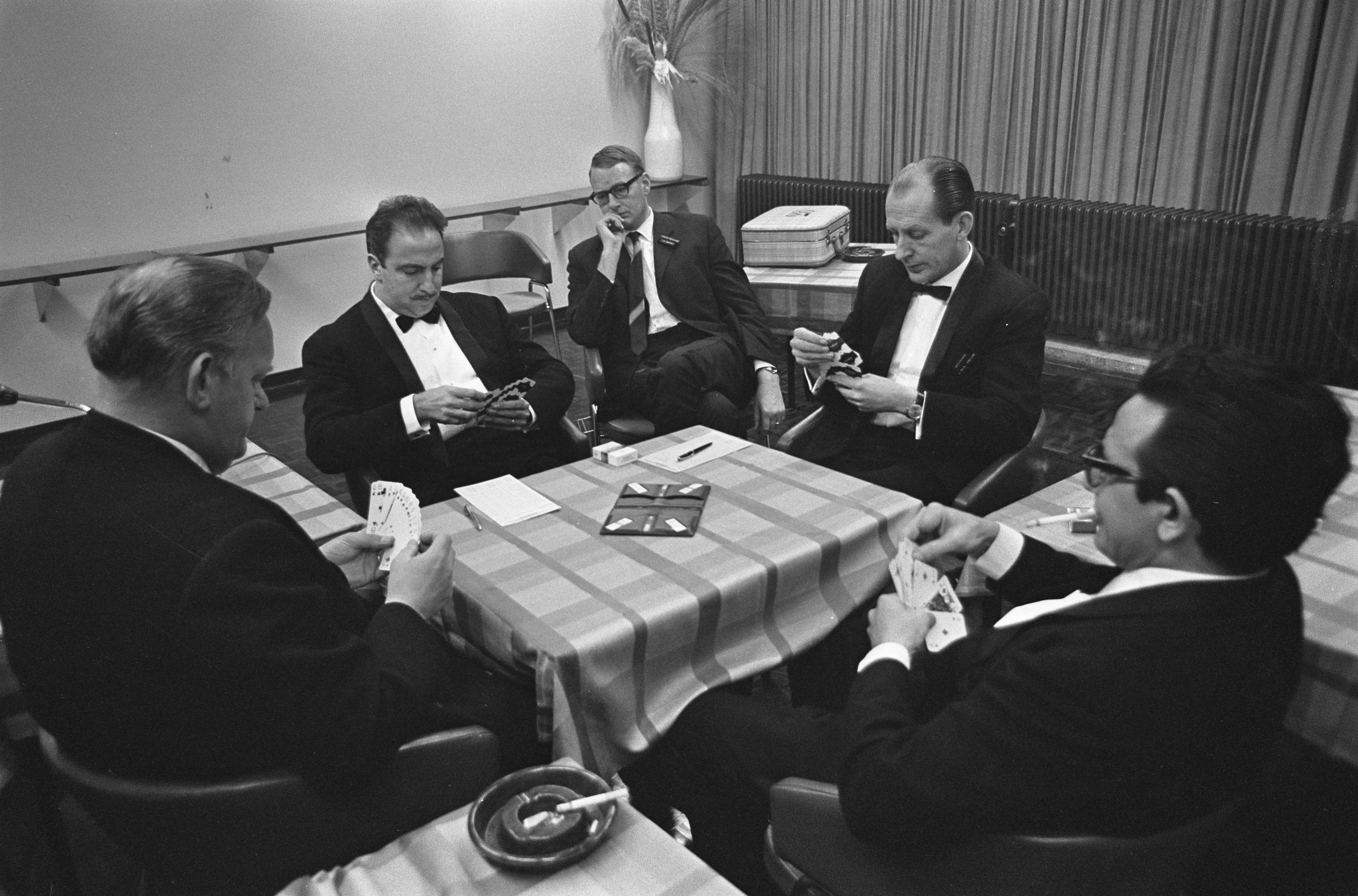
Garozzo & Belladonna (1967)

Benito Garozzo (born 5 September 1927) is an Italian American bridge player. He won 13 world championship titles with the Italian Blue Team, starting in 1961 when he was added as a last minute substitute for the Bermuda Bowl, playing in regular partnerships with Pietro Forquet to 1972 and then with Giorgio Belladonna. During those championship years he came to be considered by many experts the world's best bridge player.

== Life ==
Garozzo was born in Naples, Italy, at a time when his family lived primarily in Cairo, Egypt, but Naples was a second, summer home of his mother, four sisters and brother. At age six his brother taught him tresette, a partnership trick-taking game with dummy play. He also learned chess from his brother. During World War II, he lived at a sister's home in Naples, where family and friends played partnership games including tresette. During 1943 they started to play bridge with reference to a Culbertson book from 1933. After the war he returned to Cairo "and met better bridge players and I improved my game reading more recent books and playing the dummy on Auto Bridge." In 1984 he settled in Naples where he owned a jewelry business as of 1984.

Garozzo is user sillafu at Bridge Base Online. He has lived in the United States since 1987 and has been a citizen since January 1994. He is divorced with a son and daughter; his life partner for more than 30 years was Lea Dupont of Rockland, Delaware (also Italy and Florida). They were second in the quadrennial, 1998 World Senior Pairs Championship and won a major North American tournament for senior teams in 2009. She died on 6 April 2012.

== Career ==
Forquet and Garozzo used the Blue Club bidding system, which they developed based on the Neapolitan Club that Forquet had used with its creator Eugenio Chiaradia, the "Professor" of the early Blue Team. They wrote one book on the system together, published in 1967 (Il Fiori Blue Team, in Italian, or the Blue Team Club), and Garozzo wrote another with Léon Yallouze (1968, in French). The Blue Team as "Italy" won nine consecutive then-annual world team championships, all of the seven Bermuda Bowl and two quadrennial World Team Olympiad tournaments from 1961 to 1969, retired for two years, and returned to win the 1972 Olympiad.

The Blue Team had used six players without any change in personnel for the latter seven of those ten tournaments. Three of them retired after 1972, including Belladonna's longtime partner Walter Avarelli. Belladonna–Garozzo then established a partnership and co-created their advanced version of the Precision Club system called "Super Precision". With four other players sometimes including Forquet, they won for Italy three more world team championships in succession, the 1973 to 1975 Bermuda Bowls.

== Books ==
- Il Fiori Blue Team, Forquet and Garozzo (Milan: Prati, 1967), OCLC 59797539
- Le Trèfle "blue-team" (Paris: Presse spécialisée, 1968), 255 pp., OCLC 460460557
- Bridge de compétition, esprit et technique, Garozzo and Léon Yallouze, with collaboration of Claude Delmouly and Jean Fayard (Paris: Fayard, 1968), 293 pp.; also known as Bridge de l'avenir, OCLC 21023170, LCCN 68-137722
- The Blue Club, Garozzo and Yallouze, adapted [from the French] by Terence Reese (Faber and Faber, 1969) – "Adaptation of Bridge de compétition." LCCN 70-449743
- Italian Blue Team bridge book, Forquet and Garozzo with Enzo Mingoni (Grosset & Dunlap, 1969), pp. 274 pp. – "Translation of Il fiori blue team.", LCCN 77-86711, OCLC 77773; (London: Cassell, 1970), OCLC 559219255
- The Precision Club, C.C. Wei, adapted by Belladonna and Garozzo, transl. Jim Becker (The Bridge World and Barclay Bridge Supplies, 1972), 24 pp., OCLC 51519973 and OCLC 317308358
- Precision system e Superprecision, Belladonna and Garozzo (Milan: Mursia, 1973), 291 pp., OCLC 69200513
- Precision and Super Precision bidding, Belladonna and Garozzo (Putnam, 1975), 237 pp., LCCN 74-16574; (London: Cassell, 1976), OCLC 16362765 – transl. of Precision system e Superprecision
- New revised summary of the Super Precision system, C.C. Wei, Belladonna and Garozzo (New York: Monna Lisa Precision Corp., 1975), 39 pp., OCLC 9913817
- Il sistema Lancia, Belladonna and Garozzo (Mursia, 1976), 235 pp., LCCN 78-356252
- Il nuovissimo Fiori Romano, Belladonna and Garozzo (Mursia, 1976), 195 pp., LCCN 76-463201; see also Il sistema Fiori Romano (1955) and The Roman Club system of distributional bidding, Belladonna and Walter Avarelli (Simon and Schuster, 1959), 162 pp., OCLC 1821508

== Bridge accomplishments ==
=== Awards ===
- Charles J. Solomon Award (The Best Played Hand of the Year) 1975, 1980
- Romex Award (The Best Bid Hand of the Year) 1984

=== Wins ===
- Bermuda Bowl (10) 1961, 1962, 1963, 1965, 1966, 1967, 1969, 1973, 1974, 1975
- World Open Team Olympiad (3) 1964, 1968, 1972
- North American Bridge Championships (4)
  - North American Swiss Teams (1) 1984
  - Senior Knockout Teams (1) 1995
  - Senior Swiss Teams (1) 2009
  - Men's Pairs (1) 1971
- European Championships (5)
  - Open Teams (5) 1969, 1971, 1973, 1975, 1979
- European Union/European Community Bridge League (2)
  - Open Pairs (1) 1973
  - Mixed Teams (1) 1983
- Italian Championships (18)
  - Open Teams (12) 1958, 1963, 1967, 1968, 1970, 1974, 1975, 1976, 1977, 1978, 1983, 1985
  - Open Cup (3) 1965, 1968, 1977
  - Open Pairs (1) 1956
  - Men's Cup (1) 2003
  - Mixed Teams (1) 1983
- Other notable wins:
  - Cap Gemini Pandata World Top Invitational Pairs (1) 1991
  - Pamp World Par Contest (1) 1990

=== Runners-up ===
- Bermuda Bowl (3) 1976, 1979, 1983
- World Open Team Olympiad (1) 1976
- World Open Pairs (1) 1970
- World Senior Pairs (1) 1998
- North American Bridge Championships (6)
  - North American Swiss Teams (3) 1981, 1995, 2000
  - Jacoby Open Swiss Teams (2) 1993, 2001
  - Mixed Pairs (1) 1983
- European Championships (3)
  - Open Teams (2) 1977, 1983
  - Senior Teams 2017
- European Union/European Community Bridge League (1)
  - Open Pairs (1) 1969
- Italian Championships (8)
  - Open Teams (5) 1965, 1966, 1979, 1980, 1986
  - Open Cup (1) 1956
  - Mixed Teams (1) 1984
  - Senior Cup (1) 2003
- Other notable 2nd places:
  - Lancia Challenge Match (1) 1975
  - Sunday Times Invitational Pairs (1) 1971
  - World Bridge Production Pairs (1) 2000
