= World IMP Pairs Championship =

Contract bridge competition

The World IMP Pairs Championship is a contract bridge competition established in 1998 by the World Bridge Federation. Since then it has been a major side event in the quadrennial meet that is now called the "World Bridge Series Championships", "World Bridge Series", or "World Series".

It is open to all players without preregistration and about 15% of the pairs were transnational in the 2010 rendition.

World championship status of the IMP Pairs may be doubted or tentative for it is not explicitly listed as one of the constituent World Bridge Series Championships (nor directly listed in the side menu).

== Results ==
Year	Entries		Medalists	
1998	149 finalists	1.	(United States) Russ Ekeblad	(United States) Michael Seamon
		2.	(France) Marcel Leflon	(France) Dominique Masure
		3.	(Russia) Alexander Ladyzhensky	(Russia) Anatoli Pavlov
2002	130 finalists	1.	(Japan) Tadashi Imakura	(Japan) Masayuki Ino
		2.	(England) David Burn	(England) Nick Sandqvist
		3.	(Poland) Wojtek Olański	(Poland) Włodzimierz Starkowski
2006	213	1.	(Turkey) Okay Gür	(Turkey) Tezcan Şen
		2.	(Australia) Zoltan Nagy	(Australia) Bobby Richman
		3.	(Russia) Alexander Ladyzhensky	(Russia) Irina Ladyzhensky
2010	163	1.	(United States) Wolfe Thompson	(United States) Marc Zwerling
		2.	(Brazil) Joao-Paulo Campos	(Brazil) Miguel Villas-Boas
		3.	(United States) Kelley Hwang	(United States) John Zilic

In 1998 there were 160 pairs completed play on day one of whom 149 continued on day two.

In 2002 146 and 130. (Note: The "on-site Daily Bulletin #15" (PDF). (next morning) does not announce the IMP Pairs winners (page 1), only lists the final scores (p13). The "online Daily Bulletin #15". does not mention the event.)

There were 213 entries in 2006 of which 72 advanced to the final and 42 to the consolation. Four years later there were only 163 entries of which 73 advanced to the final.

== 1998 World Series components ==
This section in progress extends the footer Note. When complete most of it must move to our general coverage of the new so-called World Series.

IMP Pairs. The world championship status of this event is debatable and it may be debated by WBF online editors! The first two renditions covered above are from 1998 and 2002, whose tournament record is "No Data Found" online. (Select the event name in the Ekeblad record; see also the IMP Pairs To Date table.) The player record for Ekeblad does include his 1998 win. ... perhaps medalists alone are in the database?

Contemporary coverage. What is covered on page one of the contemporary website?
10th Championships 1998 (page one) - linked schedule at bottom of page

- pictures the gold medalists in knockout Teams and matchpoint Pairs, Open and Women flights (4 events);
- names the gold medalist Seniors, both teams and pairs, and Mixed Pairs (3 events);
- names the gold pair in the unheralded "Junior Triathlon" (one secondary event).

As listed in the three-column schedule (bottom of the same page), those are 3 Team Events (9-, 8-, and 4-day), 4 Pair Events (7-, 7-, 4-, and 3-day), and 1 Other Events (three Triathlon components over five days).
Alternatively, 7 events plus the complex triathlon result.

The schedule "Days and Rounds" (bottom of page) lists nine more events whose winners are not pictured or named on page one.

- Teams (2): two-day junior (J), two-day zonal (Z)
- Pairs (4): one-day zonal mixed (ZM), two-day junior (J), two-day zonal open (ZO), two-day IMP (IMP)
- Other (3+): two-day Par + Booklet, 11-day Continuous Pairs, one-day Junior Individual [with Triathlon results]

That is 16 events in all, 17 results including the triathlon complex.

Results - typically covering the final session and overall

TEAM

Junior Triathlon teams "J teams (29)".; 116+ players
Zonal Teams "(60 of 60+50)".

PAIR

(major) Mixed Pairs "final (260)".

Zonal Mixed Pairs "final (276)".
Junior Triathlon pairs "final (66 pairs)".; 132 players
Zonal Open Pairs "final (220)".
IMP Pairs "(149 pairs)".; 160 pairs yesterday, evidently no cut

OTHER

Jean Besse Par Contest "final (ranked scores for top 18 of 34)". - linked to list of all players; evidently include 1 of 4 women placed
Continuous Pairs - skip that (six and five days, 22 session results with no overall standings online)
Junior Triathlon individual "(112 players)".; 112
Junior Triathlon overall "(78 who scored overall)". - the winners did not score points in the Individual segment; first in Teams, second in Pairs!

Daily (for the Bulletin, select the date from the schedule)

Thu 0827 No.: 7 • Thursday, 27 August 1998
