= Rich DeMartino =

American bridge player (1939–2026)

Richard DeMartino (1939 – September 2, 2026) was an American bridge player from Riverside, Connecticut. He was a graduate of Lehigh University.

DeMartino died on September 2, 2026, at the age of 87.

== Bridge accomplishments ==
=== Wins ===
- North American Bridge Championships (5)
  - Leventritt Silver Ribbon Pairs (1) 2011
  - Truscott Senior Swiss Teams (2) 2006, 2007
  - Senior Knockout Teams (1) 2000
  - Keohane North American Swiss Teams (1) 1980

=== Runners-up ===
- North American Bridge Championships
  - Lebhar IMP Pairs (1) 2002
  - Truscott Senior Swiss Teams (2) 2001, 2008
  - Senior Knockout Teams (2) 2003, 2008
