= Blue Team (bridge) =

Italian bridge team

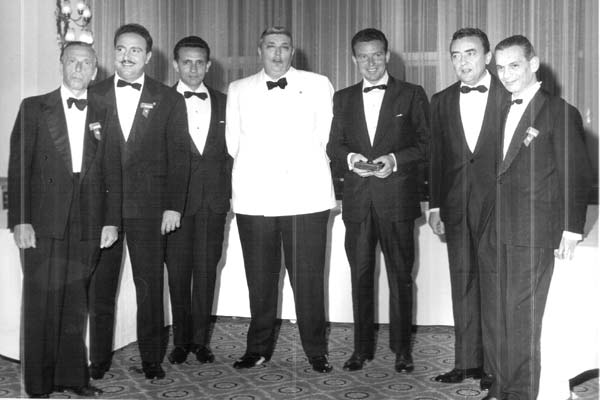
Bermuda Bowl 1966

The Blue Team (Italian: "Squadra azzurra") represented Italy in international contract bridge tournaments, winning sixteen world titles from 1957 through 1975. From 1964 to 1969 and during a 1972 comeback, the team comprised three regular pairs: Walter Avarelli–Giorgio Belladonna, Pietro Forquet–Benito Garozzo, and Massimo D'Alelio–Camillo Pabis Ticci. Eugenio Chiaradia and Guglielmo Siniscalco played in early years; Dano De Falco, Arturo Franco, and Vito Pittalà in late years. The spiritual father, long-time coach, and non-playing captain through 1966 was Carl'Alberto Perroux.

== History ==
In 1951 Italy won its first European championship (Open teams) and lost to the United States for the second Bermuda Bowl, on home ground in Naples. Chiaradia, Forquet, and Siniscalco were members of that six-man team.

Soon afterward Captain Perroux undertook long-term preparations to win those events, the only major international championships at the time. United States teams were considered the best in the world after the war, and they won two more Bermuda Bowls for North America against Europe. Great Britain, France, and Sweden were also strong, and Europe won the fifth and sixth tournaments with six-man teams from Great Britain and France before Italy won again at the European level.

The breakthrough came in 1956, when the Blue Team defeated Bermuda Bowl champion France in Stockholm earning the right to contest the 1957 Bermuda Bowl in New York City where they went on to defeat a United States team on its home ground. The players were now Walter Avarelli, Giorgio Belladonna, Eugenio Chiaradia, Massimo d'Alelio, Pietro Forquet, and Guglielmo Siniscalco. With remarkably stable personnel, the reign of the Blue Team continued, winning twelve world team championships in the thirteen years between 1957 and 1969, broken only by a sixth-place finish in the inaugural 1960 World Team Olympiad in Turin. The Blue Team retired after 1969 but key members returned to win four more world titles in the four years from 1972 to 1975.

A large part of the Blue Team's success lay in new and inventive bidding systems, which were often deemed quite strange, especially by conservative US circles. Losing teams sometimes even complained that the Italians had an unfair advantage using bids that were partly incomprehensible to Americans. Belladonna of Rome and his partners played Roman Club, a "short club" system. Neapolitans Chiaradia and Forquet played Neapolitan Club, a strong club system attributed to Professor Chiaradia and developed with Forquet. Both systems featured canapé-style openings, and often light opening bids and interventions. When young, inventive and cocky Garozzo joined the team in 1960, he further developed with Forquet the Neapolitan system into the Blue Club, which gained worldwide popularity in later years.

The string of Blue Team wins lasted until 1969, when the members announced their retirement. The American Dallas Aces team finally regained world titles for the US in the 1970 and 1971 Bermuda Bowls, when the Blue Team was absent. The Blue Team re-formed and captured the 1972 Olympiad and the 1973 and 1974 Bermuda Bowls, each time defeating the Americans. The original Aces disbanded in 1974, and the Italians again beat the USA team in 1975. In 1976, the Bermuda Bowl was won by the US and the Olympiad by Brazil, marking the end of Italy's dominance in the Open category.

Toward the end of their string of victories the Italians changed their lineup; Forquet, Pabis Ticci and D'Alelio withdrew, while Garozzo and Belladonna paired off, playing a version of Precision Club modified by Garozzo and called "Super Precision". The team was no longer officially called "Blue Team", but it still won.

== Cheating and controversies ==
The string of Blue Team victories was also followed by some cheating allegations. Originally the evidence only surfaced against "lesser" team members only, but in Avon Wilsmore's 2018 book the evidence was shown against the whole of the blue team, based on historical game records and bids.

An unusual lead. One of those featured a deal from the 1968 Bermuda Bowl in which Camillo Pabis Ticci led the ace of clubs against a four spades contract, holding ♠ J84 ♥ 9 ♦ A10763 ♣ A986. With a singleton in partner's hand the defense won two aces and two club ruffs. According to a review by John Swanson, which gives the opponent's bidding as 1♠ [South], 2♥, 2♠, 3♠, 4♠ and concludes that Pabis Ticci's explanation of the unusual lead was "patently absurd". However, in earlier review by Victor Mollo and Aksel J. Nielsen, where the bidding is given as, 1♥ [North], 1♠, 2♣, 3♠, 4♠, they conclude "On the bidding, D'Alelio [the partner of Pabis Ticci] was hardly likely to have the ♥A or a quick entry in trumps. The best chance to best the contract was, therefore, to find him with a singleton in one of the minors, and give him a ruff. Which minor? North's 2♣ bid pointed the way." However, the contemporary Sports Illustrated article (1968) collides with the bidding given by Mollo and Nielsen: "As North-South had not bid clubs, it did not seem likely that the defense would hit on the killing club ruff." Later sources note that Pabis Ticci had no reason to tell Swanson why he made the lead, and presumed the recorded: "Arthur Robinson had led the A♣ to defeat a partscore in an earlier session and he thought it would be nice to ‘hoist him by his own petard’" given by Swanson, failed to discern this was in jest. This source also notes the discrepancy between listed bidding auctions, but fails to resolve it.

The "foot-tapping" scandal. The best-known controversy occurred in 1975, when the Bermuda Bowl was held at its home site of Bermuda. Journalist Bruce Keidan reported that partners Gianfranco Facchini and Sergio Zucchelli were touching each other's shoes under the table in an apparent attempt to relay information about their hands. Cheating is of course illegal and normally grounds for expulsion from any bridge organization. Keidan's observations, which were confirmed by several witnesses, were presented to the presiding authorities of the event, who "severely reprimanded" Facchini and Zucchelli for their activity but allowed the players to continue competing in the event. Although the Italians were allowed to stay, the Bermuda Bowl authorities placed blocks underneath the tables to prevent any further foot contact.

An anonymous accusation. Another incident occurred during the 1963 tournament. An anonymous letter written in Italian was delivered to the American coach John Gerber. He secured a translator to read it aloud, but asked the translator to stop after the first paragraph, to deliver the letter to Italian captain Carl'Alberto Perroux, and to explain that Gerber had heard only the first paragraph. The writer had accused the Blue Team of cheating. After reading the letter to his team, Perroux suggested that the match be played with screens running across the tables (12 years before modern screens were introduced), but Gerber would have none of it. The goodwill engendered by this exchange inspired Perroux and his team to present their championship trophies to Gerber and the American team in what was described as the greatest act of sportsmanship in bridge history.

Avon Wilsmore book. In 2018, former Australian champion Avon Wilsmore published the book Under the Table: The Case Against the Blue Team in which he documented a great number of hands from the various World Championships and Olympiads in which he shows the Blue Team's bidding as suspicious. In particular he noted many deviations from their announced bidding system, liberal use of "off shape" takeout doubles and suspiciously high rate of killing opening leads. Wilsmore alleged a culture of cover-ups and scandal minimization within the World Bridge Federation. The author also unearthed many suspicious hands as reported at the time, which were removed from the later more formal publications, in what looks like an intentional cover-up.

== World Titles ==
=== Bermuda Bowls ===
- 1957, New York City, Walter Avarelli, Giorgio Belladonna, Eugenio Chiaradia, Massimo D'Alelio, Pietro Forquet, Guglielmo Siniscalco, Carl'Alberto Perroux (npc) defeated the United States team by 10,150 rubber bridge points.
- 1958, Como, Italy
- 1959, New York City, USA
- 1961, Buenos Aires, Argentina,
- 1962, New York City, USA
- 1963, St. Vincent, Italy
- 1965, Buenos Aires
- 1966, St. Vincent, Italy
- 1967, Miami Beach, USA
- 1969, Rio de Janeiro, Brazil
- 1973, Guaruja, Brazil
- 1974, Venice, Italy
- 1975, Southampton, Bermuda

=== World Team Olympiads ===
From 1964 to 1969 and for the 1972 comeback, the team comprised Giorgio Belladonna – Walter Avarelli; Benito Garozzo – Pietro Forquet; and Camillo Pabis Ticci – Massimo D'Alelio

- 1964, New York City, USA
- 1968, Deauville, France
- 1972, Miami Beach, USA

== European Titles ==
=== European Championship ===
- 1956, Stockholm, Sweden
- 1957 Vienna, Austria
- 1958 Oslo, Norway
- 1959 Palermo, Italy
