= United States Bridge Federation =

National federation for contract bridge in the United States

The United States Bridge Federation (USBF) is the national federation for contract bridge in the United States and a non-profit organization formed by the American Contract Bridge League (ACBL) and the American Bridge Association (ABA) in 2001 to hold the United States Bridge Championships and to select, train, and support Open, Women, Senior and Junior teams to represent the United States in international competition.

The USBF receives support for its teams from the ACBL International Fund and Junior Fund, its membership dues, contributions and entry fees for the USBCs.

== Organization ==
2018 officers.

- President: Marty Fleisher
- Vice President: Josh Parker
- CFO: Stan Subeck
- Secretary & COO: Jan Martel

The President and the Vice President are elected for 2-year terms.

== Olympic recognition ==
Originally, the USBF was also created to support the World Bridge Federation (WBF) efforts to obtain Olympic recognition for bridge. Following August 2002 recommendations by the Olympic Programme Commission, bridge and chess were recognized as "mind sports" by the International Olympic Committee but they were not found eligible for the main Olympic program.

On April 19, 2005, three years after that negative Commission report and three years before the 2008 Summer Olympic Games in Beijing whose program was its focus, four mind sports including bridge and chess established the International Mind Sports Association with primary purpose to organize quadrennial World Mind Sports Games approximately alongside the Olympics. The inaugural, 2008 World Mind Sports Games were held in Beijing during October, two months after the Summer Olympics and using the same facilities. The second, 2012 WMSG were held in Lille, France, entirely unassociated with the London Summer Olympics—smaller than in 2008, with a much smaller bridge program including no individuals, pairs, or youth events.

== See also ==
- List of bridge federations
