= American Contract Bridge League =

North American sports governing body

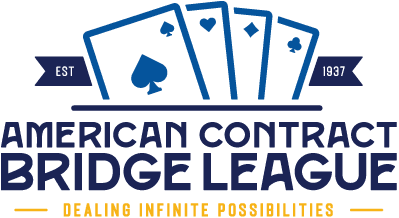

The American Contract Bridge League (ACBL) is a governing body for contract bridge in the United States, Canada, Mexico, and Bermuda. It is the largest such organization in North America having the stated mission "to promote, grow and sustain the game of bridge and serve the bridge-related interests of our Members." Its major activities are:

- sanctioning games at local bridge clubs and regional events
- certifying bridge teachers and club directors
- conducting the North American Bridge Championships (NABC)
- providing education materials and services
- administering the ACBL masterpoints system for tracking player performance
- providing oversight for ethical behavior and play
- representing the interests of its members with the World Bridge Federation.

As of 2025, it had more than 130,000 members.

== History ==
In 1927, the American Auction Bridge League was founded in 1927 in Hanover, New Hampshire. In 1929, when the "Contract" format of the game had supplanted the "Auction" version in popularity, it became the American Bridge League (ABL). Tournament bridge had three competing organizing bodies — the ABL, the American Whist League and the U.S. Bridge Association.

The ACBL was created in 1937 by the merger of the American Bridge League and the United States Bridge Association in 1937. At that time, its bridge tournaments were open only to white people, with the American Bridge Association running tournaments in which black people were allowed to play. In 1967, the American Contract Bridge League (ACBL) removed the final obstacle to ACBL membership for African-Americans when it included in its by-laws a rule that no person could be denied membership because of race, color, or creed.

== Headquarters ==
A not-for-profit organization, the ACBL was founded on December 23, 1937, in New York City and later moved its company headquarters to Greenwich, Connecticut, then to Memphis, Tennessee in 1971 and to Horn Lake, Mississippi in 2010. It has a full-time staff of about 60 employees in Horn Lake, plus about 160 tournament directors throughout the country. The headquarters also houses the League's Museum, Library and League's Hall of Fame.

== North American Bridge Championships (NABC) ==
Three times a year, in the spring, summer, and fall, the ACBL holds the North American Bridge Championships (NABC) using the duplicate bridge method of scoring, which greatly reduces the element of luck in competition. The NABC typically extends over eleven days and includes many different events. The location of the NABC is rotated among major cities and is attended by thousands of players.

== Masterpoints ==
For many, the most significant role of the ACBL is its sanctioning of club games and tournaments to award masterpoints. Players who finish at or near the top in ACBL-sanctioned events are awarded specified numbers of masterpoints, which are recorded by the League. Many players value the increase in their masterpoint totals as a measure of their success at the game. Unlike the Elo rating system developed for chess, the masterpoint system is strictly one of accumulation; players' masterpoint totals never decline (except as a penalty imposed for an ethics violation).

== Education and support ==
Members receive the monthly Bridge Bulletin magazine.

In addition to the Laws of Duplicate Bridge (named Laws of Duplicate Contract Bridge until 2008), the ACBL offers many other training and information resources at its official website including software supporting education and play of the game,

The ACBL has also published the ACBL Bridge Series, a series of books written by Audrey Grant and designed to teach the game to beginners, as well as to help more experienced players review and expand upon their knowledge of the game.

== Total Club Table Count ==
Year	Total	Online	Club
2013	3,129,056	942,040	2,157,016
2014	3,154,565	1,007,856	2,146,709
2015	3,190,839	1,058,149	2,132,690
2016	3,164,156	1,041,604	2,122,552
2017	3,154,684	1,081,206	2,073,478

== Districts ==
The ACBL consists of 25 Districts. Each District elects a district director (DD) who serves a three-year term on the ACBL Board of Directors. Clicking on the district number brings up the web site for that District. Clicking on the Report brings up the district director report.

District	Area	Director	DD Report
1	Eastern Canada	Leo Weniger	Reports
2	Ontario, Manitoba, Bermuda	Paul Janicki	Reports
3	Eastern New York (not New York City), Northern New Jersey	Carlos Munoz	Reports
4	Central New York, Eastern Pennsylvania, Delaware, Southern New Jersey	Joann Glasson	Report
5	Western PA, Eastern OH, Western NY, Western MD, Northern West VA	Sharon Fairchild	
6	Washington, DC, Virginia & Maryland	Margot Hennings	Report
7	North Carolina, South Carolina, Georgia & Eastern Tennessee	Bob Heller	Report
8	St. Louis, Northern Indiana, Central and Southern Illinois & Paducah	Georgia Heth	Reports
9	Florida and Puerto Rico	Jay Whipple III	Reports
10	Mid-South Bridge Conference	Russ Jones	Report
11	Kentucky, Western Ohio, Central Indiana & West Virginia	AJ Stephani	Report
12	Most of Michigan, Northwestern Ohio	Dennis Carman	Reports
13	Chicago, Wisconsin & Upper Michigan	Suzi Subeck	
14	Iowa, Minnesota, North & South Dakota and Nebraska	Sharon Anderson	
15	Southwest Missouri, Kansas, Oklahoma, Western Arkansas & Northern Texas	Phyllis Harlan	
16	Most of Texas, All of Mexico	Paul Cuneo	
17	Colorado, New Mexico, Arizona, Southern NV, Eastern Utah, West Texas, Wyoming	Bonnie Bagley	Report
18	Western Canada, Idaho, Montana, Wyoming, Utah	Claire Jones	Reports
19	Alaska, Washington State, British Columbia	Marv Norden	
20	Washington, Oregon, Northern California, Nevada & Hawaii	Merlin Vilhauer	
21	Northern California and part of Northern Nevada	Jacqueline Zayac	Reports
22	Southern California	David Lodge	Reports
23	California: Los Angeles County	Kevin Lane	
24	New York City and Long Island	Alvin Levy	
25	New England	Bob Bertoni	Reports

== See also ==
- ACBL Hall of Fame
- American Bridge Association
- List of American bridge players
- List of Canadian bridge players
- List of Mexican bridge players
- List of bridge governing bodies
- North American Bridge Championships
- Canadian Bridge Federation
- United States Bridge Federation
- 0-10,000 Fast Pairs
- 0-10,000 NABC Pairs
