= World Bridge Federation =

International governing body for contract bridge

- Formation: August 1958
- Type: Sports federation
- Headquarters: Lausanne, Switzerland
- Official language: English, French,
- President: Franck Riehm
- Website: www.worldbridge.org

The World Bridge Federation (WBF) is the international governing body of contract bridge. The WBF is responsible for world championship competitions, most of which are conducted at a few multi-event meets on a four-year cycle. The most prestigious championships are those for national teams in Open, Women, and Seniors categories: the Bermuda Bowl, Venice Cup, and Senior Bowl (jointly the biennial "World Teams Championships"), and the quadrennial World Team Olympiads, incorporated in the World Mind Sports Games beginning 2008.

The World Bridge Federation was founded August 1958 by delegates from Europe, North America, and South America (now Zones 1 to 3). It is incorporated under the laws of Switzerland as a 'non-profit' organization. Harold Stirling Vanderbilt was made the first honorary member of the WBF for his work developing the game. The current president is Jan Kamras of Sweden.

WBF membership now comprises 123 National Contract Bridge Organizations (NBOs) with about 700,000 affiliated members, most of whom participate in bridge competitions locally and many of whom compete nationally and internationally. The NBOs belong to the "zonal organization" in one of eight geographic zones. Each National Contract Bridge Organization agrees to fulfill certain requirements, such as opening its ranks to all its citizens and residents and upholding a standard of ethics acceptable to the WBF.

The World Bridge Federation has a Congress to which each NBO is entitled to send one delegate. The Congress meets every second year, at Team Olympiads and at World Championships. The WBF is administered by an Executive Council which is assisted by the various Committees and Consultants it appoints.

== History ==
The World Bridge Federation was formed on 18 August 1958 in Oslo, Norway, by delegates from Europe, the US, and South America. Baron Robert de Nexon, an inspiring figure in bridge from France, was elected as first President.

Charles J. Solomon, from the US (1964–1968) and Count Carl Bonde, from Sweden (1968–1970), succeeded Baron de Nexon as WBF President. With the election of Julius Rosenblum in 1970, the WBF started to assume the figure of a real World Organization. Rosenblum strongly believed that bridge needed a visible central organization with global reach rather than conducting its affairs on a local or continental basis.

Rosenblum retired in 1976, and Jaime Ortiz-Patiño from Switzerland was elected president. Under his guidance, the WBF started its new modern era and, in August 1977, was incorporated under the Laws of the State of New York as a not-for-profit organization. The Federation was re-structured as an International Federation devoted to offering its members the best possible service. The stimulation given by Ortiz-Patiño to building the organizational and administrative structure, to developing the discipline and its image, to introducing new rules and a rigid code of ethics is still effective even today. When he left the WBF in 1986 he was elected President Emeritus by acclamation for his exceptional services to bridge.

Denis Howard, from Australia, succeeded him as president from 1986 to 1990. Howard was narrowly re-elected for a second four-year term at a fractious Board of Directors meeting in 1990, where its European members favoured another candidate, José Damiani from France. The ongoing split in allegiance ultimately led to Howard resigning in January 1991 with an understanding that Ernesto d’Orsi from Brazil, who had distinguished himself as a leading bridge administrator, would succeed him on an interim basis. In turn, in August 1992, d'Orsi left the chair to Robert S. Wolff from the US, one of the top players in the history of bridge, to complete Howard's term of office. In August 1994, José Damiani was elected president.

José Damiani changed the way forward both for the WBF and Bridge itself. Under his leadership, following its initial recognition as an International Organization in 1995 pursuant to Article 29 of the Olympic Charter, the WBF was recognized as an International Sport Federation in 1999 by the International Olympic Committee. In October 2000 in Monaco, the World Bridge Federation was admitted as a member of the GAISF (General Association of International Sports Federations – Olympic and non-Olympic) – now SportAccord – at the General Assembly of this Association.

The WBF also became a member of ARISF (Association of Recognized International Sport Federations) and in October 2002 moved its headquarters to Lausanne (Switzerland), the Olympic City, where it is incorporated under Swiss Law. The WBF is one of the founder members of IMSA (International Mind Sports Association) which was formed on 19 April 2005.

José Damiani left the chair in November 2010 after 16 years of Presidency, achieving tremendous success in developing bridge, introducing new concepts of communication and information, which attracted media, sponsors and supporters; improving technological systems to manage and run the competitions, creating new events participated in by players of any category and developing youth bridge, opening the door and then constantly supporting and improving the teaching of bridge to the pupils in the schools. When he left, was elected WBF Chairman Emeritus by acclamation for his extraordinary services to bridge. In 2013, José Damiani was elected as WBF President Emeritus by acclamation.

Gianarrigo Rona, from Italy, former First Vice-president and EBL President (1999–2010), was elected president in São Paulo in September 2009 and took the chair in November 2010. He was re-elected in Bali in 2013.

== Events ==
=== Summary ===
WBF Championships:

The World Bridge Team Championships are held in the odd-numbered years:

1. World Team Championships (Open Series: Bermuda Bowl)
2. World Team Championships (Women series: Venice Cup)
3. World Team Championships (Senior series: Senior Bowl)
4. World Transnational Open Team (WTOT): World Transnational Open Teams Championship

The World Bridge Games are held every fourth year, in the same year as the Summer Olympics, previously known as World Team Olympiad.

1. National Open Teams
2. National Women Teams
3. National Senior Teams
4. World Transnational Mixed Team

The World Bridge Series Championships are held every fourth year, in the year of World Cup. It includes the following main events:

1. World Open Knockout Teams (Rosenblum Cup)
2. World Women Knockout Teams (McConnell Cup)
3. World Senior Knockout Teams (Rand Cup)
4. World Mixed Swiss Teams
5. World Mixed Pairs
6. World Open Pairs
7. World Women Pairs
8. World Senior Pairs (Hiron Trophy)

=== Global ===
- World Bridge Championships
- World Bridge Team Championships
- World Transnational Open Teams Championship
- World Team Olympiad
- World Bridge Games
- World Mind Sports Games
- Bermuda Bowl
- Venice Cup
- Senior Bowl
- Wuhan Cup
- Rosenblum Cup
- McConnell Cup
- World Senior Teams Championship
- World Mixed Swiss Teams
- World Open Pairs Championship
- World Women Pairs Championship
- World Senior Pairs Championship
- World Mixed Pairs Championship
- World IMP Pairs Championship
- World Masters Individual Championships
- World Mixed Teams Championship
- World Par Championship
- World Junior Pairs Championship (U21)
- World Junior Teams Championship (U21)
- World U26 Junior Pairs Championship
- World U26 Junior Teams Championship
- World University Bridge Championships

=== Europe ===
- European Bridge League
- European Team Championships (bridge)
- European Champions' Cup (bridge)
- European Open Bridge Championships
- European Youth Teams Championships
- European Youth Pairs Championships

=== Asia ===
- Asia Cup Bridge Championships

=== Asia Pacific (Far East) ===
- Asia Pacific Bridge Championships
- Asia Pacific Bridge Youth Championships

=== Southeast Asia ===
- Southeast Asia Bridge Championships

=== Asia and Middle East (West Asia) ===
- Asia and Middle East Bridge Championships

=== Africa ===
- African Bridge Championships

=== North America ===
- North American Bridge Championships

=== Central American & Caribbean ===
- Central American & Caribbean Bridge Championships

=== South America ===
- South American Bridge Championships

=== South Pacific ===
- South Pacific Bridge Championships

=== Commonwealth ===
- Commonwealth Nations Bridge Championships

=== Others ===
- Buffett Cup
- Cavendish Invitational
- Macallan Invitational Pairs

== Purpose ==
The purpose of the World Bridge Federation shall be:

- to promote, foster, promulgate and develop the sport of Bridge throughout the world;
- to be in the Olympic Movement, remaining affiliated with International Olympic Committee (IOC) as a recognized International Federation (IF) in conformity with the requirements of the Olympic Charter;
- to contribute to the achievement of the goals set out in the Olympic Charter, in particular by way of spreading Olympism and Olympic education;
- to federate National Bridge Associations in all countries;
- to devise methods and conduct competitions to award international or world championship titles;
- to establish standard laws for its contests adopting the International Code and supplementing them as may be required, but not inconsistent with them;
- to support and encourage the promotion of sports ethics;
- to dedicate its efforts to ensuring that in bridge contests the spirit of fair play prevails;
- to fight against doping in sport and to take measures, the goal of which is to prevent endangering the health of bridge players.

== President and Executive Council ==
The World Bridge Federation is run by an Executive Council consisting of delegates from the eight geographical zones, plus the President.

There are five delegates from the European Bridge League (Zone 1), five from the North American Bridge Federation (Zone 2), two from the Pacific Asia Bridge Federation (Zone 6) and one from each of the other five geographical zones. In addition, two more members of the council are elected by the High Level Players Commission. Thus the council has twenty voting members, including the President.

The Executive Council meets annually at the site of the World Championships. There is also a Management Committee which transacts necessary business between Executive Council meetings.

The presidential term is four years from late in even-number non-Olympiad years such as 2014.

- 1958–1964, Robert de Nexon, France
- 1964–1968, Charles J. Solomon, US
- 1968–1970, Carl C:son Bonde, Sweden
- 1970–1976, Julius Rosenblum
- 1976–1986, Jaime Ortiz-Patiño, Switzerland (later President Emeritus)
- 1986–1991, Denis Howard, Australia (resigned January 1991)
- 1991–1992, Ernesto d'Orsi, Brazil
- 1992–1994, Bobby Wolff, US
- 1994–2010, José Damiani, France
- 2010–2022, Gianarrigo Rona, Italy
- 2023-2025, Jan Kamras, Sweden
- 2025- , Franck Riehm, France

President Gianarrigo Rona (born 1940, Pavia) was elected at the 2009 World Team Championships and succeeded José Damiani after the 2010 World Bridge Series. He was president of the European Bridge League (EBL) from 1999 to 2010. His term ends at year-end 2022.

On 25 August 2022, in Wroclaw, Poland, Jan Kamras from Gothenburg, Sweden was unanimously elected as WBF President, to take up the office on 1 January 2023. He had been elected European Bridge League president in 2018.

== Zonal Organizations & NBOs ==
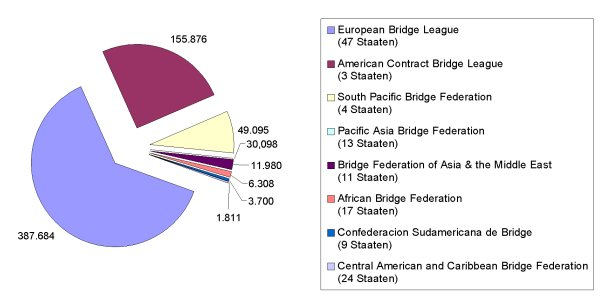

=== Regions of Members ===
103 Countries in 8 Zones (Updated at 31 March 2022):

Number	Region	Countries
1	ZONE 1 – European Bridge League (EBL)	46
2	ZONE 2 – North American Bridge Federation (NABF)	3
3	ZONE 3 – Confederación Sudamericana de Bridge (CSB)	10
4	ZONE 4 – Bridge Federation of Asia & the Middle East (BFAME)	10
5	ZONE 5 – Central American & Caribbean Bridge Federation (CAC)	12
6	ZONE 6 – Asia Pacific Bridge Federation (APBF)	12
7	ZONE 7 – South Pacific Bridge Federation (SPBF)	2
8	ZONE 8 – African Bridge Federation (ABF)	8
Total	World Bridge Federation	103

http://www.worldbridge.org/bridge-zones/qzone1/

http://www.worldbridge.org/bridge-zones/qzone2/

http://www.worldbridge.org/bridge-zones/qzone3/

http://www.worldbridge.org/bridge-zones/qzone4/

http://www.worldbridge.org/bridge-zones/qzone5/

http://www.worldbridge.org/bridge-zones/qzone6/

http://www.worldbridge.org/bridge-zones/qzone7/

http://www.worldbridge.org/bridge-zones/qzone8/

For purposes of administration and furtherance of its objectives and to comply with the International Olympic Committee's principles of the five IOC rings, the WBF structure is divided into five geographical Continental Conferences identical to the IOC's five rings. For organizational reasons the WBF established zones within any of the five Continents which, although part of a Continent, shall be entitled to have at least one member on the Executive and berths in WBF tournaments set forth in Article 9 of the By-Laws. Each zone has its own Zonal Conference of its member NBOs, organizing, managing and administrating its activity and conducting both its own zonal competitions and those delegated to it by the WBF.

The 8 Zonal Conferences are in June 2021:

1. Zone 1: Europe - European Bridge League (EBL) - Founded in 1947 at Copenhagen - 46 Countries
2. Zone 2: North America - North American Bridge Federation (NABF) - Founded in 2018 at New York City - 3 Countries
3. Zone 3: South America - South American Bridge Federation / Confederación Sudamericana de Bridge (CSB) - Founded in 1958 at Buenos Aires - 10 Countries
4. Zone 4: Asia and Middle East - Bridge Federation of Asia & the Middle East (BFAME) - Founded in 1979 at Amman - 10 Countries
5. Zone 5: Central America and Caribbean - Central American & Caribbean Bridge Federation (CAC) - Founded in 1979 at Barbados - 13 Countries
6. Zone 6: Asia Pacific - Asia Pacific Bridge Federation (APBF) - Founded in 1957 at Bangkok - 12 Countries
7. Zone 7: South Pacific - South Pacific Bridge Federation (SPBF) - Founded in 1979 at Palmerston North - 2 Countries
8. Zone 8: Africa - African Bridge Federation (ABF) - Founded in 2000 at Cairo - 8 Countries

The WBF has shown strong and steady growth and its membership now comprises 124 National Bridge Organizations (NBOs) with approximately 1,000,000 affiliated members who participate actively in competitive bridge events (locally, nationally and internationally). Each National Bridge Organization agrees to fulfill certain requirements, such as opening its ranks to all its citizens and residents and upholding a standard of ethics acceptable to the WBF.

=== Number ===
ZONE 1 – European Bridge League (Europe) 384,186 (46 NBOs)

ZONE 2 – North American Bridge Federation (North America) 124,909 (3 NBOs)

ZONE 3 – Confederation Sudamericana de Bridge (South America) 3,575 (10 NBOs)

ZONE 4 – Bridge Federation of Asia & the Middle East (Asia & Middle East) 7,307 (11 NBOs)

ZONE 5 – Central American & Caribbean Bridge Federation (Central American & Caribbean) 895 (14 NBOs)

ZONE 6 – Asia Pacific Bridge Federation (Asia Pacific) 50,242 (12 NBOs)

ZONE 7 – South Pacific Bridge Federation (South Pacific) 51,420 (04 NBOs)

ZONE 8 – African Bridge Federation (Africa) 6,086 (12 NBOs)

== See also ==
- List of bridge governing bodies
- List of bridge competitions and awards
- World Backgammon Federation
