= Ruth Sherman =

American bridge player (1903–1965)

Ruth Therese Sherman (November 24, 1903 – April 6, 1965) was an American bridge player from New York City. In 1944 she became ACBL Life Master number 45, the sixth woman to achieve the rank.

In American Contract Bridge League (ACBL) teams-of-four competition, Sherman won two of the three most important annual tournaments, the Chicago Board-a-Match (now Reisinger) in 1944 and the Vanderbilt in 1953. (The other is the Spingold; few women have won even two.) She also won the premier competition (then "national championship") for mixed pairs in 1942 and 1950, in partnerships with Harry Fishbein and Peter Leventritt; the premier event for women pairs in 1944 and 1949 with Margaret Wagar and Kay Rhodes. She won the analogous mixed teams three times, the women teams once.

Sherman was a daughter of Judge Henry L. and Edna Limburger Sherman. Both her grandfathers emigrated from Germany and her maternal grandmother was born in Hungary. She received a Ph.D. in physical chemistry from Vassar College and worked several years in chemical research. She was a Ph.D. research chemist when she became a strong player in a recurring game including her brother John and based at the family apartment on Park Avenue.

Sherman and her brother John won the Grand National Trophy in 1935 with a score of 67%. (Goren says the Mixed Team Championship, 1935.)

She and Helen Sobel won the "women's Eastern pair championship" three years running, 1943 to 1945.

In 1953 she and three other American women defeated the European Bridge League champion women in an unofficial match at the Regency Club in New York—Helen Sobel, Edith Kemp, and Margaret Wagar.

Sherman died "suddenly" in her home at 14 East 75th Street in Manhattan, at age 61 on April 6, 1965.

Sherman bequeathed $60,000 to four nieces and two nephews. However, her chief beneficiary was "her old friend and partner, Adam Meredith, British bridge expert." (Meredith was one of the six-man Great Britain team that won the 1955 Bermuda Bowl in New York City, the first win for Europe against North America.) Sherman's will set aside $450,000 in trust "to enable [Sherman] to continue his bridge activities," an amount equivalent to $4,597,000 in 2025. The remainder would revert to her family upon his death (in 1976).

According to Alan Truscott, a British expatriate who had been New York Times bridge columnist for 15 months at the time of her death in April 1964, "In recent years she became less active in American championships but played successfully in many European tournaments, often in partnership with former World Champion Adam Meredith."

During the month before her death, Sherman and Sally Johnson led the field of women pairs at the ACBL Spring Nationals after three of four sessions but finished third.

According to Charles Goren, Sherman had been exceptionally reliable: "Her partners could rely upon her, but so could her opponents." She and the "brilliant" Meredith played mainly pairs in Europe, however, and she added deceptive tactics under his influence.

== Bridge accomplishments ==
=== Wins ===
- Grand National Trophy (1) 1935
- North American Bridge Championships (11)
  - Rockwell Mixed Pairs (1) 1950
  - Whitehead Women's Pairs (2) 1944, 1949
  - Hilliard Mixed Pairs (1) 1942
  - Vanderbilt (1) 1953
  - Wagar Women's Knockout Teams (1) 1942
  - Marcus Cup (1) 1953
  - Chicago Mixed Board-a-Match (3) 1935, 1945, 1951
  - Reisinger (1) 1944

=== Runners-up ===
- North American Bridge Championships
  - von Zedtwitz Life Master Pairs (1) 1946
  - Whitehead Women's Pairs (3) 1934, 1945, 1947
  - Fall National Open Pairs (1) 1947
  - Wagar Women's Knockout Teams (6) 1948, 1950, 1952, 1953, 1954, 1955
  - Reisinger (1) 1953
