= Olive Peterson =

American bridge player and teacher (1898–1965)

Olive Stone Avery Peterson (January 20, 1898 – February 10, 1965) was an American bridge player and teacher from St. Davids, Pennsylvania, on the Philadelphia Main Line.

== Biography ==
Peterson was born in Cincinnati and moved to Indiana as a child. In 1925, she moved to Philadelphia, and was one of several strong bridge players based in the city. She was the "chief assistant" of Milton Work, an extraordinarily successful lecturer and writer on the game (and sometimes called its "Grand Old Man"), when she developed a partnership with young Charles Goren. Goren "became Mr. Work's technical assistant by the end of the decade".

Peterson and Work conducted a 36-day bridge cruise on the ocean liner Carinthia to the North Cape, Norway, and Russia in 1933. After he died in June 1934, Peterson assisted Goren "especially at bridge teachers' conventions"; "in seminars for 35 years".

Peterson and Maud Zontlein were the first winners of the Whitehead Trophy in 1930, the national championship for women pairs that continues as the Whitehead Women's Pairs (North America-level in the ACBL). With different partners she won again in 1932 (Mrs. Jay Jones) and 1945 (Peggy Golder), placed second in 1935 (Doris Fuller). In the Hilliard Mixed Pairs, then the premier tournament for mixed pairs (male–female), she was 1942 runner-up with John R. Crawford and 1943 winner with Goren. In women teams-of-four, she was a winner in 1938 and 1942, a runner-up four times from 1948 to 1954 – perhaps in partnership with Peggy Golder/Solomon from 1942 onward (Women's Board-a-Match Teams). In mixed teams, she was a winner four times from 1940 to 1944 and a runner-up in 1952 (Master Mixed Teams). She was Master Individual runner-up in 1942; women were winners only twice, runners-up only twice, in thirty renditions before that individuals championship was discontinued.

Peterson and Margaret Wagar became ACBL Life Masters number 36 and 37 in 1943, the fourth and fifth women to achieve the rank after Sally Young, Helen Sobel, and Peggy Solomon.

Peterson's husband was Harold Peterson, whom she married in 1919. She died in Philadelphia on February 10, 1965, age 67 years old.

== Publications ==
In a bridge column published during the week following her death, Alan Truscott credited Peterson with four books but named none of them.

- One Hundred and One Celebrated Hands in Contract Bridge: Bid and Played, edited by Milton Work and Peterson (Philadelphia: John C. Winston Co., 1933), 215 pp., OCLC 16727481
- The Work–Peterson Accurate Valuation System of Contract Bridge, Work and Peterson (Winston, 1934), 101 pp., OCLC 3344065
- Common-sense Contract: Featuring the Goren System, foreword by Charles Goren (Peterson, 193?), 80 pp., OCLC 51572224

== Bridge accomplishments ==
=== Honors ===
- Honorary Secretary of the ACBL, 1951 – recognizing "her many executive contributions to the game"

=== Wins ===
- North American Bridge Championships (10)
  - Whitehead Women's Pairs (3) 1930, 1932, 1945
  - Hilliard Mixed Pairs (1) 1943
  - Wagar Women's Knockout Teams (2) 1938, 1942
  - Chicago Mixed Board-a-Match (4) 1940, 1942, 1943, 1944

=== Runners-up ===
- North American Bridge Championships
  - Master Individual (1) 1942
  - Whitehead Women's Pairs (1) 1935
  - Hilliard Mixed Pairs (1) 1942
  - Wagar Women's Knockout Teams (4) 1948, 1950, 1953, 1954
  - Chicago Mixed Board-a-Match (1) 1952
