= Peggy Solomon =

American bridge player (1908–1995)

- Born: Margery Mastbaum; August 14, 1908; Philadelphia, Pennsylvania, U.S.
- Died: March 4, 1995 (age 86); Elkins Park, Pennsylvania, U.S.
- Occupation: Professional Bridge player
- Spouse(s): Benjamin M. Golder; Charles J. Solomon
- Parent(s): Etta Wedell Mastbaum; Jules Mastbaum

Margery Lee Golder Solomon (née Mastbaum; August 14, 1908 – March 4, 1995), was an American bridge player from Philadelphia, Pennsylvania. As Peggy Golder in 1942, she became ACBL Life Master number 33, the third woman to achieve the rank after Sally Young and Helen Sobel.

== Life ==
Solomon was the daughter of Etta (née Wedell) and Jules Mastbaum, a Philadelphia real estate investor who specialized in movie theaters and the philanthropist whose estate established that city's Rodin Museum. Both parents played bridge. In 1930, she married Benjamin M. Golder, who was a U.S. Congressman from Philadelphia (1925–1933); he would be 1946 president of the American Contract Bridge League (ACBL) and die in office. Peggy Golder started bridge lessons "shortly before World War II". Charles Goren was her second teacher and Charles J. Solomon, another star player from Philadelphia became her mentor; they married in 1948. Charles Solomon would be president of the ACBL in 1958, the year the World Bridge Federation was established, and second president of the WBF (1964–68). He died in 1975.

Solomon died at age 86, at home in Elkins Park, on March 4, 1995. According to a daughter the cause was pulmonary fibrosis. She was survived by a sister, two daughters, Joan Golder Ash and Norma Golder Brunswick, eight grandchildren and eight great-grandchildren.

== Career ==
Solomon played in one world championship tournament, the fourth quadrennial World Team Olympiad in 1972. She was a member of the 6-person USA women team that finished third behind Italy and South Africa. With Gail Moss instead of Solomon the team would win bronze and gold medals in 1976 and 1980.

In ACBL competition Solomon won one national-level tournament in the open category, the 1944 Chicago Board-a-Match Teams (now the North America-level Reisinger). She won the premier national championship for women pairs (Whitehead Women's Pairs) in 1945 with Olive Peterson and in 1960 with Mary Jane Farrell. She won the analogous tournament for women teams five times from 1942 to 1970 and that for mixed teams three times.

== Books ==
- Bridge for Women, Solomon and others (Doubleday, 1967), 221 pp., LCCN 67-10526

== Bridge accomplishments ==
=== Wins ===
- North American Bridge Championships (12)
  - Whitehead Women's Pairs (2) 1945, 1960
  - Wagar Women's Knockout Teams (5) 1942, 1957, 1964, 1968, 1970
  - Marcus Cup (1) 1967
  - Chicago Mixed Board-a-Match (3) 1949, 1950, 1959
  - Reisinger (1) 1944

=== Runners-up ===
- North American Bridge Championships (15)
  - Hilliard Mixed Pairs (1) 1943
  - Rockwell Mixed Pairs (1) 1961
  - Smith Life Master Women's Pairs (3) 1965, 1966, 1967
  - Wagar Women's Knockout Teams (5) 1948, 1953, 1954, 1961, 1967
  - Chicago Mixed Board-a-Match (2) 1939, 1940
  - Spingold (1) 1944
  - Reisinger (1) 1953
  - Vanderbilt (1) 1954
