= Hermine Baron =

American bridge player

Hermine Baron (November 1, 1912 – September 27, 1996) was an American contract bridge player who was a Grand Life Master.

A native of Omaha, Nebraska, she moved to Los Angeles in the mid-1940s. Having contracted polio at an early age, (Note: The New York Times obituary of October 6, 1996 states at the age of 13 while the ACBL Hall of Fame biographical summary states at the age of 11. In the November 2, 1964 edition of Sports Illustrated, an article by Charles Goren indicates the age as 13.) she played the game from a wheelchair. At her death, she had accumulated 22,654 masterpoints, the most of any woman in the USA. Winner of several national titles and over 100 regional events, she also represented the USA internationally in 1968, 1978 and 1982. (Note: The 5th Edition of The Official Encyclopedia of Bridge (1994, American Contract Bridge League, ISBN 0-943855-48-9) states the three years on page 169 under the topic Handicapped Players while the 6th Edition (2001, American Contract Bridge League, ISBN 0-943855-44-6) states the years 1968 and 1978 on page 607 under Baron's biographical summary but states "three times" under the Handicapped Players topic on page 180. The ACBL Hall of Fame biographical summary indicates the two years 1968 and 1978. The New York Times obituary refers to 1968, 1978 and 1982. Her World Bridge Federation profile (below) lists three events in her playing record - participation in the 1978 and 1982 Women Pairs events and the Women Team event in 1968.)

Baron died in West Hollywood, California, in 1996. was inducted into the ACBL Hall of Fame in 2002.

== Playing record ==
- Grand Life Master with 22,654.52 masterpoints — the most of any woman in the U.S. at the time of her death in 1996
- Helen Sobel Smith Trophy: Life Master's Women's Pairs winner in 1963 with Anne Burnstein
- McKenney Trophy (now the Barry Crane Top 500): won in 1964 and 1970. Her 1964 winning total of 1370 masterpoints was an all-time record subsequently broken in 1969
- Sternberg Trophy (formerly the Coffin Trophy): Women's Board-a-Match Teams winner in 1964 with Mary Jane Farell, Bee Schenkin and Peggy Solomon and in 1968 with Mary Jane Farell, Sally Johnson, Bee Schenkin, Peggy Solomon and Rhoda Walsh; runner-up in 1967 with Mary Jane Farell, Bee Schenkin and Peggy Solomon and in 1974 with Carol Greenhut, Trudi Nugit, and Kerri Shuman
- Von Zedtwitz Gold Cup: Life Master Pairs winner with Meyer Schleifer in 1966
- Whitehead Trophy: Women's Pairs winner in 1968 with Rhoda Walsh and in 1982 with Beverly Rosenberg; runner-up in 1967 with Marilyn Johnson, in 1975 with Carol Greenhut and in 1977 and 1980 with Beverly Rosenberg
- Cavendish Trophy: Blue Ribbon Pairs runner-up in 1971 with Michael Lawrence
- Represented the United States in world competition in 1968, 1978, and 1982

== Bridge accomplishments ==
=== Honors ===
- ACBL Hall of Fame, 2002

=== Wins ===
- North American Bridge Championships (7)
  - von Zedtwitz Life Master Pairs (1) 1966
  - Whitehead Women's Pairs (2) 1968, 1982
  - Smith Life Master Women's Pairs (1) 1963
  - Wagar Women's Knockout Teams (2) 1964, 1968
  - Keohane North American Swiss Teams (1) 1979

=== Runners-up ===
- North American Bridge Championships (8)
  - Whitehead Women's Pairs (4) 1967, 1975, 1977, 1980
  - Blue Ribbon Pairs (1) 1971
  - Hilliard Mixed Pairs (1) 1961
  - Wagar Women's Knockout Teams (2) 1967, 1974
