= Rhoda Walsh =

American bridge player

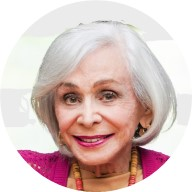
Rhoda Walsh - May 2023

Rhoda Walsh (born 1933) is an American bridge player from Los Angeles, California. She is a graduate from Loyola Law School and is an attorney.

Walsh is a World Bridge Federation (WBF) Master and a North American (ACBL) Grand Life Master. In teams-of-four competition, she earned a bronze medal with the 1968 USA women in the quadrennial World Team Olympiad. That year she also won three major women's North American Bridge Championships—the Wagar Women's Knockout Teams and both pairs tournaments, the Whitehead and Smith playing with two different partners.

Walsh is a two-time winner of the annual Whitehead Women's Pairs, inaugurated 1930, playing with Hermine Baron in 1968 and with Kerri Davis in 1972. She is a three-time winner of the annual Smith Life Master Women's Pairs (est. 1961), playing with Dorothy Talmage in 1968, Amalya Kearse in 1972, and Sabine Zenkel in 1989. Five major championships for women pairs, with five partners. She won the major pairs championship for seniors, Leventritt Silver Ribbon Pairs, in 2000 playing with Charles Coon.

== Bridge accomplishments ==
=== Wins ===
- North American Bridge Championships (12)
  - Leventritt Silver Ribbon Pairs (1) 2000
  - Whitehead Women's Pairs (2) 1968, 1972
  - Smith Life Master Women's Pairs (3) 1968, 1972, 1989
  - Machlin Women's Swiss Teams (2) 1985, 1988
  - Wagar Women's Knockout Teams (1) 1968
  - Keohane North American Swiss Teams (2) 1984, 1985
  - Chicago Mixed Board-a-Match (1) 1976

=== Runners-up ===
- North American Bridge Championships
  - Rockwell Mixed Pairs (1) 2000
  - Smith Life Master Women's Pairs (2) 1982, 1998
  - Machlin Women's Swiss Teams (1) 1987
  - Keohane North American Swiss Teams (1) 1986
  - Chicago Mixed Board-a-Match (1) 2005
