= Marcus Cup =

Contract bridge team event

The Marcus Cup was a two-session open team event contested by Senior Masters at the American Contract Bridge League’s summer North American Bridge Championships. From 1946 to 1952, the event winners had been awarded the Faber Cup but in 1953 the Marcus Cup was donated by friends in memory of Edward N. Marcus and replaced the Faber Cup

From 1946 to 1971 scoring had been by Board-a- Match but was changed in 1972 to international match points with Swiss pairings. The Marcus Cup was relegated as a secondary championship in 1968 and discontinued after 1978.

== Winners ==
Year	Winners Awarded the Faber Cup	Runners-up
1946	Charles Groden, Harold Harkavy, Elinor Murdoch, Jack Shore	Mrs. L. Goldstein, G. Schildmiller, M. Basher, L. A. Bernard
1947	Jack Cushing, Charles Saunders, Howard Zacks, Helen Zacks	Mrs. E. Folline, Mrs. S. Landauer, C. Shapiro, H. Gerst, Dr. A Salasky
1948	Maynard Adams, F. Ayres Bombeck, Bobby Nail, Edson Wood	M. Levin, P. Bacher, Mr. and Mrs. L. Jaeger, Peter Leventritt
1949	H. Sanborn Brown, John F. Carlin, Sam Delott, Irving Deuter	Ruth Sherman, H. Sonnenblick, Dr. William V. Lipton, W. M. Lichtenstein, Edgar Kaplan
1950	Gretchen Feldstein, Gratian Goldstein, Helen Lackman, Herman Lackman	P. Godin, M. Blain, E. Beausoleil, J. J. Perrault
1951	Dorothy E. Berning, Jack Cushing, Jay T. Feigus, Sims Gaynor (tied with); Jeff Glick, Arthur S. Goldsmith, Alvin Landy, Sol Mogal	
1952	Warren Blank, J. George Boeckh, Jack Denny, Duke Dautell, Jerome Jacobs	Mr. and Mrs. E. Schwartz, S. Fink, Dr. L. Mark, B. O. Johnson
	Winners Awarded the Marcus Cup	Runners-up
1953	Lee Hazen, Richard Kahn, Edgar Kaplan, Dr. William V. Lipton, Ruth Sherman (tied with); Israel Cohen, Richard Freeman, Fred Karpin, Mike Michaels	
1954	Gerald Ackerman, Leonard Karp, Gwen Montgomery, Robert Rice	L. Lentz, S. Landauer, H. Gerst, N. Berlin (tied with ) W. Ridenhour, J. C Barefoot Jr., Mr. and Mrs W. H. Holderness
1955	John Gerber, Jim Jacoby, Oswald Jacoby, Paul Hodge, Walter Wolff Jr.	Dr. William V. Lipton, V. Mitchell, R. Reynolds, C. Russell, Frank Nichols
1956	Mr. and Mrs. A.H. Brown, Richard Hart, F. Bert Powley	Dr. and Mrs. S. Warner, R. M. Rice, L. Karp, G. Ackerman
1957	John H. Moran, Bill Root, Peggy Rotzell, Robert Sitnek	Mrs. T. J. McKenna, Nathan Gerstman, R. Brown, Mrs. R. Nevins
1958	Jackie Begin, Barbara Brier, Maurice Paul, Peter Pender (tied with); Fred Berger, Dr. John Fisher, Emma Jean Hawes, Margaret Wagar (and); Mrs. J. Theron Brown, Nathan Gerstman, Dr. Richard Greene, Frank Nichols, Charles Whitehead	
1959	Nathan Gerstman, Mrs. Thomas McKenna, Eric R. Murray, Mrs. William Selikoff, Paul Trent	Dorothy Hayden, T. Brasher, A. Bell, G. Polak, Dan Rotman (tied with); R. Wolf, R. Bendan, P. Szecsi, G. Sorter, M. Tish
1960	E.G. Burke, Eddie Kantar, Marshall Miles, Bill Root, Tobias Stone	Mrs. J. Coleman, Mrs. C. Munn, S. Rebner, C. Potvin
1961	Armand Barfus, Billy Eisenberg, Marty Ginsburg, Jeff Westheimer	P. Adams, A. Greene, Mrs. S. Warner, Mrs. B. Tepper
1962	Alan Bell, Leona Low, Marc Low, Roger Sarfaty, Richard Vission	Mr. and Mrs. T. Griffin, D. Lickly, A. B. Harris
1963	Hal Kandler, Jim Linhart, Hugh Ross, Richard Zeckhauser	Paul Hodge, John Gerber, Eric R. Murray, D. Carter (tied with); Harry Fishbein, Alvin Landy, Charles J. Solomon, N. Silverstein, Barry Crane, M. Shuman (and); Mrs. E. F. Nicholas, J.P. Miler, J. Blair, F. Ayres Bombeck (and); R. B. Henderson, L. Rafkin, Danny Kleinman, R. Violin
1964	Jack Marsch, Douglas Thomson, Howard Rubin, Hank Promislow, Helen Promislow	F. Vine, H. Bork, M. Martino, L. Woodcock (tied with); Mr. and Mrs. V. Remey, A. Silber, C. Bishop, R. Rosen
1965	Charles Shannon, Robert Hathaway, Ron Andersen, Darrell Penrod	Barry Crane, P. Rank, G. Marsee, R. Zoller
1966	Phyllis Kantar, Eddie Kantar, Marshall Miles, Harvey Cohen	T. Michaels, I. Cohen, Mrs. P. McDaniel, A. Gabrilovitch
1967	Charles J. Solomon, Peggy Solomon, Harry Fishbein, Julius L. Rosenblum, Sylvia Stein	William Flannery, H. Sachs, Paul Swanson, Bobby Goldman

== Bibliography ==
- Frey, Richard L.; Truscott, Alan F., eds. (1964). The Official Encyclopedia of Bridge (1st ed.). New York: Crown Publishers. LCCN 64023817.
- Frey, Richard L.; Truscott, Alan F.; Kearse, Amalya L., eds. (1976). The Official Encyclopedia of Bridge (3rd ed.). New York: Crown Publishers. ISBN 0-517-52724-3. LCCN 76017053.
- Francis, Henry G.; Truscott, Alan F.; Frey, Richard L.; Hayward, Diane, eds. (1984). The Official Encyclopedia of Bridge (4th ed.). New York: Crown Publishers. ISBN 0-517-55272-8. LCCN 84001791.
