= Chicago Mixed Board-a-Match =

North American bridge competition

The Mixed Board-a-Match Teams is a bridge competition held at the summer American Contract Bridge League (ACBL) North American Bridge Championship (NABC).

From 2010 the event is officially the Freeman Mixed Board-a-Match Teams, as it is contested for the Richard Freeman Memorial Trophy, named for Richard Freeman (1933–2009). This is the fourth trophy in play, following Lebhar, Barclay, and Chicago.

The event is a board-a-match team event. The event typically last 2–3 days with each day being a round consisting of two sessions of 26 boards. The event is open.

== History ==
The Mixed Teams championship is one of the oldest ACBL events, first played in 1929. It is a four-session event with two qualifying and two final sessions. At one time it was restricted to players with at least 100 masterpoints (thus the name to 1995, "Master Mixed Teams") but now is an open event.

It was originally known as the Master Mixed Teams. In 1996, the name changed to the present designation. From 1946 to 1955, a separate event with national rating was held on the West Coast.

The winners have their names inscribed on the Chicago Trophy.

== Winners ==
At least four champion Mixed Teams defended their titles successfully and without change in personnel, in 1944, 1950, 1953, and 1978. The 1977–78 winners finished in a 3-way tie in 1979.

Charles Goren won the event six times from 1938 to 1954 and Helen Sobel six times from 1941 to 1968, five times as teammates.

Master Mixed Teams (1929–1995)
Year	Winners	Runners-up
1929	Max Cohen, Mrs. M. K. Alexander, Rose Fleischer, R. Frankenstein	(unknown)
1930	Winfield Liggett, Dorothy Rice Sims, P. Hal Sims, Derrick Wernher	W. Cleveland Cogswell, J. Arnold Farrar, Doris Fuller, George Reith
1931	Mrs. G. A. Bennett, Doris Fuller, Charles Lochridge, George Reith	E. M. Baker, Margaret Beech, William McKenney, Mrs. H. D. Stahl
1932	Marie Black, Huber Boscowitz, Sam Fry, Olga Hilliard	Mrs. L. Bloomberg, Bernard Cone, Louis Gotthelf, Mrs. Thomas Stern
1933	David Burnstine, Elinor Murdoch, Mrs. Ivan Stengel, Edwin Wetzlar	Dorothy Rice Sims, P. Hal Sims, Margaret Wagar, Waldemar von Zedtwitz
1934	Lester Bachner, Mrs. Lester Bachner, James Lemon, Martha Lemon	Mitch Barnes, Barbara Collyer, Doris Fuller, Henry Vogel
1935	Helen Bonwit, Howard Schenken, Ruth Sherman, Louis H. Watson	Mary Clement, Mary Zita Jacoby, Oswald Jacoby, Waldemar von Zedtwitz
1936	Hortense Evans, Louis Haddad, Robert McPherran, Elizabeth Whitney	B. Jay Becker, Helen Bonwit, Howard Schenken, Sally Young
1937	Philip Abramsohn, Estelle Drescher, Morrie Elis, Ann Naiman	S. Garton Churchill, Phyllis Gardner, Travers LeGros, Dorothy Roberts
1938	Doris Fuller, Charles Goren, Henry Vogel, Sally Young	Eleanor Hirsch, John Kunkel, Helen Pendelton Rockwell, Milton Vernoff
1939	Robert Chatkin, Valerie Klein, Alvin Landy, Florence Stratford	Edward Ellenbogen, Peggy Golder, Helen Mitchell, Charles J. Solomon
1940	Marie Black, Henry Chanin, Olive Peterson, Waldemar von Zedtwitz	Edward Ellenbogen, Peggy Golder, Helen Mitchell, Charles J. Solomon
1941	Charles Goren, Sidney Silodor, Helen Sobel, Sally Young	Oswald Jacoby, Louise Wainwright, Sherman Stearns, Mrs. William A. Tucker
1942	John R. Crawford, Olive Peterson, Margaret Wagar, Waldemar von Zedtwitz	Philip Abramsohn, Kay Rhodes, Edith Seligman, Tobias Stone
1943	Charles Goren, Olive Peterson, Sidney Silodor, Helen Sobel	Edith Hammond, Pat Lightner, Walter Malowan, Stuyvestant Wainwright
1944	Charles Goren, Olive Peterson, Sidney Silodor, Helen Sobel	Marie Basher, Edward Cohn, John R. Crawford, Margaret Wagar
1945	John R. Crawford, Ruth Sherman, Margaret Wagar, Waldemar von Zedtwitz	Estelle Elis, Harry Fishbein, Al Roth, Edith Seligman
1946	Samuel Katz, Alicia Kempner, Evelyn Lebhar, Bertram Lebhar Jr.	Charles Goren, Emily Folline, Sidney Silodor, Helen Sobel
1947	Harry Fishbein, Ruth Goldberg, Ludwig Kabakjian, Edith Seligman	2/3. Emily Folline, Peter Leventritt, David Warner, Sally Young; 2/3. Harold Harkavy, Jane Jaeger, Lewis Jaeger, Mrs. G. Strasser
1948	John R. Crawford, Charles Goren, Helen Sobel, Margaret Wagar	Harry Fishbein, Ruth Goldberg, Ludwig Kabakjian, Edith Seligman
1949	Peter Leventritt, Charles J. Solomon, Peggy Solomon, Sally Young	John R. Crawford, Charles Goren, Helen Sobel, Margaret Wagar
1950	Peter Leventritt, Charles J. Solomon, Peggy Solomon, Sally Young	John R. Crawford, Charles Goren, Helen Sobel, Margaret Wagar
1951	Jane Jaeger, Richard Kahn, Leo Roet, Ruth Sherman	Myron Field, Agnes Gordon, Charles Goren, Helen Sobel
1952	Anne Burnstein, Harold Harkavy, Al Roth, Edith Seligman	John R. Crawford, Emma Jean Hawes, George Rapée, Olive Peterson, Sidney Silodor
1953	Anne Burnstein, Harold Harkavy, Edith Kemp, Alvin Roth	Emmanual Hochfeld, Mary Jane Kauder, Lew Mathe, Gloria Turner
1954	Charles Goren, Sidney Silodor, Helen Sobel, Margaret Wagar	Marianne Boschan, Gertrude Eberson, David Murray, Lewis Tubbs
1955	Gratian Goldstein, Harold Harkavy, Terry Michaels, Alvin Roth	Mary Bowden, Doug Drury, Robert P. Freedman, Agnes Gordon, Eric Murray
1956	Mary Bowden, Doug Drury, Robert P. Freedman, Agnes Gordon, Eric Murray	Barbara Brier, Jan Stone, Tobias Stone, Waldemar von Zedtwitz
1957	John R. Crawford, Milton Ellenby, Harold Harkavy, Edith Kemp, Gloria Turner	Sam Fry, Dorothy Hayden, Sally Johnson, Ira Rubin
1958	Leland Ferer, Gratian Goldstein, Eunice Rosen, Billy Rosen	B. Jay Becker, Bee Gale, Betty Goldberg, Howard Schenken
1959	Peter Leventritt, Robert F. Jordan, Charles J. Solomon, Peggy Solomon, Sally Young	Leonard Harmon, Edgar Kaplan, Peggy Rotzell, Alfred Sheinwold, Betty Sheinwold
1960	William Grieve, Alicia Kempner, George Rapée, Betty Ann Welch	B. Jay Becker, Dorothy Hayden, Norman Kay, Sidney Silodor, Sylvia Stein
1961	Richard Freeman, Emmanuel Hochfeld, Louise Robinson, Gloria Turner	John Fisher, Jean Frankel, Lou Gurvich, Boots Kendrick, Sidney Lazard
1962	Charles Coon, Agnes Gordon, Eric Murray, Helen Portugal	Norman Kay, Sidney Silodor, Sylvia Stein, Margaret Wagar
1963	Sidney Lazard, Betty Kaplan, Edgar Kaplan, Stella Rebner	Israel Cohen, Garner McDaniel, Terry Michaels, Alvin Roth
1964	John Fisher, John Gerber, Emma Jean Hawes, Margaret Wagar	2/3. Martin Cohn, Hampton Hume, Bernadine Jenkins, Mary Philley; 2/3. Harold Harkavy, Virginia Heckel, Edith Kemp, Cliff Russell, Jerome Yavitz
After 1964 the historic Chicago Trophy (see Reisinger) became the prize for winning this event.
1965	Barbara Brier, Al Roth, Jan Stone, Tobias Stone, Waldemar von Zedtwitz	Burt Norton, Carol Norton, Alan Press, Billy Rosen, Sylvia Stein, Carol Stolkin
1966	Jimmy Cayne, Judy Dryer, Paul Soloway, Eunice Rosen, Billy Rosen	Barbara Rappaport, Al Roth, Bee Schenken, Howard Schenken
1967	Mike Cappelletti, Kathie Cappelletti, Mike Moss, Gail Shane	2/4. John Gerber, Norman Kay, Carol Klar, George Rosenkranz, Edith Rosenkranz; 2/4. B. Jay Becker, John Fisher, Dorothy Hayden, Emma Jean Hawes; 2/4. Leland Ferer, Gratian Goldstein, Fred Hamilton, Sylvia Stein
1968	Minda Brachman, Jim Jacoby, Oswald Jacoby, Helen Sobel Smith	Betty Kaplan, Edgar Kaplan, George Rapée, Carol Stolkin
1969	Janice Cohn, Flo Orner, Charles Peres, Dan Rotman, Ivar Stakgold, Alice Stakgold	Barry Crane, Jules Farell, Mary Jane Farell, Marilyn Johnson, Peter Rank
1970	Dorothy Bare, Gerald Bare, Eugenie Mathe, Lew Mathe	2/3. Ken Barbour, William Daly, Mickey Rosenthal, Helen Strasberg, Dave Strasberg; 2/3. Betty Adler, Julian Adler, Dave Sachs, Sue Sachs
1971	John Anderson, Ron Andersen, Marilyn McCrary, Sue Picus	Dorsey Brooks, Zerrene Brooks, Joan Remey, Vincent Remey
1972	Gail Moss, Mike Moss, Marietta Passell, Bill Passell	B. Jay Becker, John Fisher, Emma Jean Hawes, Alan Truscott, Dorothy Hayden Truscott
1973	Ellen Alfandre, Phil Feldesman, Edith Sacks, Stanley Tomchin	2/5. Betty Adler, Julian Adler, David Sachs, Sue Sachs; 2/5. Doug Fraser, Sandra Fraser, Barbara Saltsman, Joey Silver; 2/5. Mark Berger, Sallie Johnson, Amos Kaminsky, Jack Saltz, Mona Stocknoff; 2/5. Carol Crawford, John R. Crawford, Barbara Rappaport, Al Roth
1974	Edith Kemp, Jerome Yavitz, Rita Seamon, William Seamon	Robert Lipsitz, Jo Morse, Peggy Parker, Steve Parker, Steve Robinson
1975	Gerald Caravelli, Nancy Gruver, Jim Linhart, Helen Utegaard	2/3. Shirlee Lazarus, Eugenie Mathe, Lew Mathe, Joan Remey, Vincent Remey, Jim Zimmerman; 2/3. Carol Crawford, John R. Crawford, Barbara Rappaport, Al Roth
1976	1/2. Richard H. Katz, Carol Sanders, Paul Swanson, Marion Weed; 1/2. Fred Hamilton, John Sutherlin, Peggy Sutherlin, Rhoda Walsh, Nancy Weichsel, Peter Weichsel	
1977	Nancy Alpaugh, Joan DeWitt, Mark Lair, Sidney Lazard	Ethel Dayboch, Morrie Freier, Richard Paulsen, Sue Thornton
1978	Nancy Alpaugh, Joan DeWitt, Mark Lair, Sidney Lazard	Betty Adler, Julian Adler, David Sachs, Sue Sachs
1979	1/3. Nancy Alpaugh, Joan DeWitt, Mark Lair, Sidney Lazard; 1/3. Betty Bloom, Steven Bloom, Mark Cohen, Edith Sacks; 1/3. Lynne Feldman, Mark Feldman, Ed Nagy, Sharon Smith	
1980	Barry Crane, Jose John Hamui, Elias Konstantinovsky, Laura Mariscal, Kerri Shuman	Gerald Caravelli, Dennis McGarry, Joan Remey, Vincent Remey, Helen Utegaard
1981	Doug Fraser, Sandra Fraser, Ralph Katz, Paul Lewis, Linda Peterson, Esta Van Zandt	Bill Cole, Lynn Deas, Norb Kremer, Beth Palmer
1982	1/2. Tommy Sanders, Carol Sanders, Sidney Lazard, Joan DeWitt; 1/2. Lynn Deas, Norb Kremer, Beth Palmer, Bill Cole	
1983	Alan Kudisch, Judy Landau, Drew Casen, Karen Allison	Kathie Wei, Judi Radin, Eric Rodwell, Jeff Meckstroth
1984	Susan Sternberg, Bernie Chazen, Juanita Skelton, Allan Cokin, Barbara Sion, Steve Sion	Edith Rosenkranz, George Rosenkranz, Carol Sanders, Mark Lair, Lynn Deas, Eddie Wold
1985	Bill Pollack, Rozanne Pollack, Alan Truscott, Dorothy Truscott, Evelyn Levitt, Dave Treadwell	Rich Schmieder, Jyme Tropila, Martin Miller, Carol Dietz
1986	Mark Cohen, Stasha Cohen, Harold Lilie, Joyce Lilie, David Berkowitz, Lisa Berkowitz	Carol Simon, Bob Etter, Min Ross, Hugh Ross, Paul Kern, Claire Kern
1987	1/2. Jim Mahaffey, Linda Perlman, Joan Remey, Paul Soloway; 1/2. Bob Hamman, Kerri Shuman, Rama Linz, Bobby Levin	
1988	1/2. Robert Radwin, Helen Utegaard, Flo Rotman, Dan Rotman; 1/2. Ken Cohen, JoAnn Manfield, Robert Woodard, Ev Cogan	
1989	Alan Sontag, Peter Weichsel, Gladys Collier, Juanita Chambers	2/3. Marty Bergen, Dori Cohen, Mary Oshlag, Richard Oshlag; 2/3. Chester Hirsch, Mary Jane Farell, Jacqui Mitchell, Victor Mitchell
1990	Edith Rosenkranz, George Rosenkranz, Eddie Wold, Marinesa Letizia, Kerri Shuman, Mark Lair	Jim Becker, Ellee Lewis, Howard Chandross, Vivian Whalen
1991	John Carruthers, Katie Thorpe, Brad Moss, Bronia Gmach, Jared Lilienstein	Robert Thomson, Asya Kamsky, Rozanne Pollack, Michael Radin, Marty Bergen, Dori Cohen
1992	Gabriel Chagas, Marinesa Letizia, Dennis Clerkin, Juanita Chambers, Mike Lawrence, Beth Palmer	Björn Fallenius, Kathy Anday, Shirlee Meckstroth, Jeff Meckstroth
1993	Lisa Berkowitz, David Berkowitz, Beth Palmer, William Pettis	Nancy Molesworth, Stephen Schneer, Robbie Hopkins, Joan Lewis
1994	Mike Lucas, Michael Seamon, Renee Mancuso, Steve Sion, Barbara Sion	George Rosenkranz, Sabine Zenkel, Eddie Wold, Kerri Sanborn, Larry Cohen
1995	Joyce Lilie, Harold Lilie, David Berkowitz, Lisa Berkowitz	Jeff Schuett, Ginny Schuett, Tom Kniest, Karen Walker, Florine Walters, Mark Feldman

Mixed Board-a-Match Teams, 1996 to present
Year	Winners	Runners-up
Chicago Mixed Board-a-Match Teams, for the Chicago Trophy, 1996 to 2009
1996	Gaylor Kasle, Barbara Kasle, Nancy Passell, Garey Hayden	Jimmy Cayne, Jacqui Mitchell, Amalya Kearse, Mike Passell, Chuck Burger, Suzy Burger
1997	Marc Low, Sandra Low, Sue Sachs, David Sachs	Kit Woolsey, Sally Woolsey, JoAnne Casen, Larry Mori, Martha Katz, Ralph Katz
1998	David Berkowitz, Lisa Berkowitz, Jim Bjerkan, Cheri Bjerkan	Rita Shugart, Geir Helgemo, Kitty Munson, Andrew Robson
1999	Lynn Baker, Karen McCallum, Zia Mahmood, Matt Granovetter	Richard Gabriel, Ellen Gabriel, Rhoda Prager, Brian Ellis
2000	Barry Rigal, Sue Picus, Sylvia Moss, Judi Radin, Alex Ornstein, Jeff Ferro	Mel Colchamiro, Janet Colchamiro, Betty Bloom, Steve Bloom, Kitty Munson Cooper, Steven Cooper
2001	Rose Meltzer, Peter Weichsel, Chip Martel, Jan Martel, Lew Stansby, JoAnna Stansby	Lou Ann O'Rourke, Joan Stein, Hjördis Eythorsdottir, Curtis Cheek, Billy Miller
2002	Michael Rosenberg, Debbie Rosenberg, Lisa Berkowitz, Larry Cohen, Richard Schwartz, Margie Gwozdzinsky	Paul Lewis, Linda Lewis, Bob Glasson, Joann Glasson
2003	Fulvio Fantoni, Hemant Lall, Donna Compton, Petra Hamman	Richard Zeckhauser, Mildred Breed, Eddie Wold, Hjördis Eythorsdottir
2004	Steve Robinson, Lynn Deas, Bill Pollack, Rozanne Pollack, Beth Palmer, Bill Pettis	Rose Meltzer, Peter Weichsel, Lew Stansby, JoAnna Stansby, Jan Martel, Chip Martel
2005	Peggy Kaplan, Petra Hamman, Rozanne Pollack, Steve Beatty, Hemant Lall, Marty Fleisher	Barbara Sonsini, John Sutherlin, Tobi Sokolow, Mark Lair, Rhoda Walsh
2006	Lynn Deas, Beth Palmer, William Pettis, Rozanne Pollack, Bill Pollack	Richard Schwartz, Margie Gwozdzinsky, Walid Elahmady, Daniela von Arnim, Teri Casen, Drew Casen
2007	Don Stack, Linda Eakes, Jack Spear, Nancy Spear	Stephen Goldstein, Leslie Paryzer, John Stiefel, Sheila Gabay
2008	Chris Willenken, Migry Zur Campanile, JoAnna Stansby, Lew Stansby	Gaylor Kasle, Barbara Kasle, Jo Morse, Garey Hayden
2009	Sabine Auken, Robert Hampton, John Hurd, Sylvie Willard, Jenny Wolpert, Joel Wooldridge	Jim Foster, Stella Rainey, Linda Smith, Ron L. Smith
Freeman Mixed Board-a-Match Teams, for the Richard Freeman Memorial Trophy, 2010 to present
2010	Gary Cohler, Jill Meyers, JoAnna Stansby, Lew Stansby	Gloria Bart, Les Bart, Sally Woolsey, Kit Woolsey
2011	Judith Bianco, Petra Hamman, Peggy Kaplan, Win Allegaert, Hemant Lall	David Berkowitz, Lisa Berkowitz, Josef Blass, Ewa Harasimowicz, Anna Sarniak, Marcin Leśniewski
2012	Joan Eaton, Michael Roche, Nader Hanna, Karen Cumpstone	Debbie Rosenberg, Richard Zeckhauser, Joel Wooldridge, Gabrielle Sherman
2013	Win Allegaert, Petra Hamman, David Grainger, Judy Bianco	Robert Brady, Craig Ganzer, Dana Berkowitz, Mihaela Balint
2014	Joan Eaton, Michael Roche, Nader Hanna, Karen Cumpstone	2/3. Robert Brady, Craig Ganzer, Dana Berkowitz, Lisa Berkowitz, David Berkowitz; 2/3. Beth Palmer, Robin Taylor, Alan Sontag, William Cole, Michael Polowan, Lynn Deas
2015	Paul Fireman, Shannon Cappelletti, John Hurd, Vincent Demuy, Sylvie Willard, Benedicte Cronier	
2016	Victor King, Linda Lewis, Paul Lewis, Sheila Gabay	
2017	Thomas Paske, Marusa Basa, Alexander Hydes, Sarah Bell	May Sakr, Ivan Tsonchev, Rose Meltzer, Justyna Zmuda, Nikolay Demeriv, Valdimir Marashev
2018	Douglas Doub, Yiji Starr, Jiang Gu, Rose Yan	May Sakr, Nikolaos Delimpaltadakis, Vasileios Vroustis, Giorgia Botta
2019	Veri Kiljan, Christina Madsen, Migry Zur Campanile, Thomas Paske	Glenn Robbins, Shen Qi, Wenfei Wang, Jiang Gu
2020	Not held	Not held
2021	Not held	Not held
2022	Joyce Hill, Signe Buus Thomsen, Mikael Rimstedt, Kevin Dwyer, Amber Lin, Shan Huang	John McAllister, Alexander Wernle, Jovanka Smederevac, Michael Xu, Olivia Schireson

== West Coast interlude ==
From 1946 to 1955, a separate event with national rating was held on the West Coast.

West Coast Master Mixed Teams (1946–1955)
Year	Winners
1946	Nell Wells, George Wells, Kay Dunn, James Dunn
1947	Rose Eidem, Meyer Schleifer, Betty Bysshe, Detmar Walther
1948	Alma Rosekrans, Waldemar von Zedtwitz, Maurice Seiler, Mrs. Maurice Seiler
1949	Arnold Kauder, Mary Jane Kauder, Helen Cale, Jack Ehrlenbach
1950	Arnold Kauder, Mary Jane Kauder, Helen Cale, Jack Ehrlenbach
1951	Ruth Smith, Casey Million, Nell Wells, John Hancock
1952	Don Oakie, Mrs. James Moffatt, Stella Rebner, Doug Steen
1953	Barry Cohen, Stella Rebner, Malvine Klausner, Edward Frischauer
1954	Harrient Rethers, Clarence Strouse, Alicia Kempner, Barry Crane
1955	Arnold Kauder, Mary Jane Kauder, Nell Wells, Ernest Rovere
