= Billy Rosen =

American bridge player (1928–2019)

William Albert Rosen (September 12, 1928, in Chicago, Illinois – April 7, 2019) was an American bridge player, best known for winning the 1954 Bermuda Bowl world championship.

He started playing bridge while attending De Paul University.

Rosen won his first national title in 1952, the National Men's Pairs in partnership with Arthur Grau. In August 1953, Rosen and Milton Ellenby made the pages of Life magazine as the youngest winners of the von Zedtwitz Life Master Pairs. (annual from 1930). The same year he won the McKenney Trophy which the American Contract Bridge League gives to the player earning the most masterpoints in a calendar year. Rosen won the Spingold tournament twice in a row, in 1953 and 1954, the latter helping him qualify for that year's Bermuda Bowl world team championship. The Bermuda win made him, at 25 years old, the youngest world champion ever to do so; a record broken by Bobby Levin in 1981 at the age of 23. Rosen's win earned him the title of World Bridge Federation World Life Master .

The September 1954 issue of Playboy Magazine the editors wrote, "If bridge has a world's champion, he's a twenty four year old guy named William Rosen." Rosen contributed a column on "Tournament Bridge" for the issue. He wrote, "The game holds a beguiling interest to most people because it is undoubtedly the most challenging of all card games, combining skill in bidding, play of the hand and also, the subtle art of gamesmanship."

In 1958, Rosen won the Lebhar Trophy for winning the Master Mixed Pairs at the North American Championships. He won the prize playing with his wife Eunice Rosen, also a champion bridge player. In 1965, Rosen was on the Chicago team that captured the Sports Illustrated Trophy. Bridge guru Charles Goren called Rosen the "star performer of the Chicago team."

In 1978 Rosen won the Grand National Teams. Rosen won his last national championship in 1980.

Rosen worked as an options trader at the Chicago Board Options Exchange before retiring in 1994. He lived in Highland Park, Illinois.

Rosen was Inducted into the ACBL Hall of Fame in 2014 as a recipient of the von Zedtwitz Award.

== Tributes ==
- In a 1983 column, Alan Truscott of The New York Times called Bill Rosen "[one] of the greatest names in the game".
- Bob Hamman, one of the world's greatest players, named Rosen as one of "three players that I'd call really intimidating – if you could see some obscure way declarer could work it out (to make his contract), you had to be afraid he would work it out."

== Bridge accomplishments ==
=== Awards and honors ===
- McKenney Trophy, 1953
- ACBL Hall of Fame, von Zedtwitz Award 2014

=== Wins ===
- Bermuda Bowl (1) 1954
- North American Bridge Championships (8)
  - Spingold (2) 1953, 1954
  - Grand National Teams (1) 1978
  - Men's Board-a-Match Teams (1) 1980
  - Master Mixed Teams (2) 1958, 1966
  - Life Master Pairs (1) 1953
  - Men's Pairs (1) 1952

=== Runners-up ===
- Bermuda Bowl (1) 1955
- North American Bridge Championships (1)
  - Master Mixed Teams (1) 1965
