= Gratian Goldstein =

American bridge player

Gratian Goldstein is an American bridge player.

== Bridge accomplishments ==
=== Wins ===
- North American Bridge Championships (8)
  - Marcus Cup (1) 1950
  - Chicago Mixed Board-a-Match (2) 1955, 1958
  - Smith Life Master Women's Pairs (1) 1969
  - Wagar Women's Knockout Teams (2) 1948, 1953
  - Whitehead Women's Pairs (2) 1947, 1948

=== Runners-up ===
- North American Bridge Championships (7)
  - Blue Ribbon Pairs (1) 1966
  - Chicago Mixed Board-a-Match (1) 1967
  - Rockwell Mixed Pairs (1) 1972
  - Smith Life Master Women's Pairs (1) 1961
  - Wagar Women's Knockout Teams (2) 1945, 1971
  - Whitehead Women's Pairs (1) 1953
