= Doris Fuller =

American bridge player and teacher

Doris H. Fuller (Feb 1893 -- 26 Jan 1962) was an American bridge player and teacher from New York City.

Born in Alabama to Sam and Amelia Weil, she married Robert B. "Bob" Fuller in New York City on February 24, 1923.

The veteran New York Times bridge columnist Albert Morehead wrote in tribute, under the subheading "Colorful Player Dies" on February 6, 1962: "The death of Doris Fuller (Mrs. Robert B. Fuller) last week removed from the bridge scene one of the most colorful characters of the times thirty or more years ago when contract bridge was a new game." She had been a bridge teacher and club duplicate director, as well as a champion player. According to Morehead, "many an aspiring young bridge expert" during the Great Depression played bridge for the money to live. "Bob Fuller was making a living and his wife always had a spare dollar for anyone who couldn't eat without it."

Fuller directed both regular bridge games at "several New York clubs" and some special events. Prior to the annual Asbury Park tournament in 1941, for example, she and Al Sobel held in a city hotel "their annual duplicate game" whose prize was payment of tournament entry fees; she and Mrs. E. M. Goddard conducted tournament "warm-up games".

Fuller first won the American Bridge League or "national" championship for women teams-of-four in 1935 with Helen White, Florence Stratford, and Angela Quigley. Fuller and White were partners at least on the deal featured in a Morehead bridge column. The same foursome were champions again in 1936, and runners-up in 1937 when White was newly wed to Al Sobel – or Helen Sobel, as she became world-famous.

Fuller died in New York on January 26, 1962, aged 69.

== Bridge accomplishments ==
=== Wins ===
- North American Bridge Championships (8)
  - Whitehead Women's Pairs (2) 1933, 1937
  - Wagar Women's Knockout Teams (4) 1935, 1936, 1939, 1954
  - Chicago Mixed Board-a-Match (2) 1931, 1938

=== Runners-up ===
- North American Bridge Championships
  - von Zedtwitz Life Master Pairs (1) 1937
  - Whitehead Women's Pairs (3) 1935, 1936, 1939
  - Wagar Women's Knockout Teams (3) 1937, 1941, 1942
  - Chicago Mixed Board-a-Match (2) 1930, 1934
