= Peggy Kaplan =

American bridge player

Peggy Kaplan is an American bridge player.

Kaplan lives in Minnesota. Kaplan was one of the contributing editors to the 7th edition of The Official Encyclopedia of Bridge.

== Bridge accomplishments ==
=== Wins ===
- North American Bridge Championships (5)
  - Freeman Mixed Board-a-Match (1) 2011
  - Chicago Mixed Board-a-Match (1) 2005
  - Fast Open Pairs (1) 2009
  - Rockwell Mixed Pairs (1) 2004

=== Runners-up ===
- North American Bridge Championships (1)
  - Machlin Women's Swiss Teams (1) 2007
