= Lisa Berkowitz =

American bridge player

Lisa Berkowitz (born 1952) is an American bridge player. She is from Old Tappan, New Jersey.

== Bridge accomplishments ==
=== Wins ===
- North American Bridge Championships (17)
  - Rockwell Mixed Pairs (2) 1986, 1987
  - Whitehead Women's Pairs (1) 2009
  - North American Pairs (1) 1995
  - Machlin Women's Swiss Teams (2) 1992, 2008
  - Wagar Women's Knockout Teams (3) 1990, 1999, 2009
  - Sternberg Women's Board-a-Match Teams (3) 1986, 1988, 1997
  - Chicago Mixed Board-a-Match (5) 1986, 1993, 1995, 1998, 2002

=== Runners-up ===
- North American Bridge Championships
  - Freeman Mixed Board-a-Match (2) 2011, 2014
  - Wagar Women's Knockout Teams (2) 1985, 1994
