= Agnes Gordon =

Canadian bridge player

Agnes Leslie Gordon (née Willson, April 25, 1906 – May 24, 1967) was a Canadian bridge player.

She was born in Ridgetown, Ontario and graduated from the University of Ontario. She moved to Buffalo, New York after her marriage in 1930, although she remained a Canadian citizen.

At the North American Bridge Championships meet in November–December 1963 (then called "Fall Nationals"), Gordon and Eric Murray won the premier annual mixed pairs championship of the North America, the Rockwell Mixed Pairs. Their score in the final session, 506.5 matchpoints of 650 top, or 78%, is the highest single-session score in the history of national-level ACBL pairs competition (at least, it was from the 1930s to 2009). During the same 16-day meet, Gordon and Helen Portugal tied for first place among eight pairs in trials to play on the USA women team in May 1964. They went on to earn silver medals in the second quadrennial World Team Olympiad with a second-place finish behind Great Britain. (Note: Gordon and Portugal also played on the USA women team in the 1960 Olympiad (the first meet organized by the World Bridge Federation), when it finished fifth in a field of 14. USA was the only team from North America among 14 in the 1960 field; Canada entered a team in 1964, as did Mexico. The WBF database includes only the two Team Olympiad appearances for Gordon in world-level tournaments. During her lifetime there were also two "World Pair Olympiad" meets, 1962 and 1966, for which the database covers only first and second place pairs (mixed pairs, open pairs, women pairs).)

She died in a Buffalo hospital in 1967 from cancer.

Gordon was inducted into the ACBL Hall of Fame in 2009.

== Bridge accomplishments ==
=== Honors ===
- ACBL Hall of Fame, Von Zedtwitz Award 2009

=== Wins ===
- North American Bridge Championships (6)
  - Rockwell Mixed Pairs (1) 1963
  - Whitehead Women's Pairs (1) 1961
  - Wagar Women's Knockout Teams (1) 1967
  - Chicago Mixed Board-a-Match (2) 1956, 1962
  - Reisinger (1) 1948

=== Runners-up ===
- North American Bridge Championships
  - Rockwell Mixed Pairs (1) 1956
  - Whitehead Women's Pairs (1) 1959
  - Smith Life Master Women's Pairs (1) 1964
  - Wagar Women's Knockout Teams (3) 1957, 1963, 1964
  - Chicago Mixed Board-a-Match (2) 1951, 1955
