= Thomas K. Sanders =

American bridge player (1932–2011)

Thomas Koonce Sanders, Sr. (July 21, 1932 – December 11, 2011) was an American bridge player from Nashville, Tennessee. He was married to Carol Sanders, a women's teams world champion player.

Sanders was a graduate of Vanderbilt University. He won a single World Bridge Federation gold medal as USA non-playing captain in the 1981 Bermuda Bowl tournament.

Tom and Carol Sanders were both inducted into the ACBL Hall of Fame in 2002. They were recipients of the von Zedtwitz Award; that is, were nominated for the Hall of Fame by a "Veterans Committee" of players out of the limelight for some time.

== Bridge accomplishments ==
=== Honors ===
- ACBL Hall of Fame, von Zedtwitz Award 2002

=== Wins ===
- North American Bridge Championships (12)
  - von Zedtwitz Life Master Pairs (1) 1982
  - Blue Ribbon Pairs (1) 1977
  - Hilliard Mixed Pairs (1) 1961
  - Vanderbilt (3) 1979, 1990, 1993
  - Senior Knockout Teams (3) 1995, 1996, 1998
  - Mitchell Board-a-Match Teams (1) 1983
  - Chicago Mixed Board-a-Match (1) 1982
  - Spingold (1) 1977

=== Runners-up ===
- North American Bridge Championships
  - Rockwell Mixed Pairs (1) 1979
  - Silodor Open Pairs (1) 1960
  - Wernher Open Pairs (1) 1963
  - Vanderbilt (2) 1978, 1985
  - Keohane North American Swiss Teams (1) 1982
  - Reisinger (3) 1961, 1973, 1986
  - Spingold (1) 1963
