= Alicia Kempner =

American bridge player

Alicia Kempner is an American bridge player from Palm Springs, California.

== Bridge accomplishments ==
=== Wins ===
- North American Bridge Championships (5)
  - Wagar Women's Knockout Teams (2) 1962, 1969
  - Barclay Trophy (1) 1954
  - Chicago Mixed Board-a-Match (2) 1946, 1960

=== Runners-up ===
- North American Bridge Championships
  - Rockwell Mixed Pairs (1) 1955
  - Whitehead Women's Pairs (1) 1965
