= Mike Cappelletti =

American lawyer, bridge player, and poker player (1938–2013)

- Born: April 18, 1938; Providence, Rhode Island, U.S.
- Died: November 14, 2013 (aged 75)
- Occupation: Lawyer
- Known for: Bridge and poker

Armand Michael Cappelletti (April 18, 1938 – November 14, 2013) was an American lawyer most widely known as a bridge player and poker authority.

== Biography ==
Cappelletti was born in Providence, Rhode Island, the son of carpenter Armand "Mondo" Cappelletti and Rose Marie (Carpinelli). Both sets of his grandparents were born in Italy.

He later lived in Alexandria, Virginia, where he practiced for the U.S. Department of Justice and later as a public defender in Washington, D.C. Among poker players he is known as the author of the books Cappelletti on Omaha, The Best of Cappelletti on Omaha, Poker at the Millennium, and How to Win at Omaha High-Low Poker, and also as columnist for the poker magazine, CardPlayer. He is well known among bridge players as the inventor of the Cappelletti convention. Cappelletti was an American Contract Bridge League (ACBL) Grand Life Master with more than 24,000 masterpoints. He won a bronze medal in the 1974 World Mixed Teams. Cappelletti also authored the book 100 Bridge Problems: Using Poker Tactics in Contract Bridge.

Cappelletti made some contributions to bridge bidding including Cappelletti over notrump, Cappelletti over one-of-a-major doubled, Cappelletti two-suited cuebids.

== Bridge accomplishments ==
=== Wins ===
- North American Bridge Championships (2)
  - Master Mixed Teams (1) 1967
  - Silver Ribbon Pairs (1) 2013

=== Runners-up ===
- North American Bridge Championships (7)
  - Reisinger (1) 1991
  - Men's Board-a-Match Teams (1) 1979
  - North American Swiss Teams (1) 1985
  - Blue Ribbon Pairs (2) 1973, 1977
  - Mixed Pairs (2) 1967, 1988
- Other notable 2nd places:
  - Goldman Pairs (1) 1968
