= Carol Crawford =

American backgammon and bridge player

Carol Ann Crawford (February 22, 1934 – August 10, 1982), also known as Carol Stolkin and Carol Ross, was an American backgammon and bridge player from Buffalo, New York who spent many years in Detroit, Michigan. In 1973, she became the second woman to win the World Backgammon Championship.

She was the second wife of John R. Crawford. Like her husband, she had talent in both backgammon and bridge.

== Bridge accomplishments ==
=== Wins ===
National Mixed Pair

=== Runners-up ===
- North American Bridge Championships (3)
  - Chicago Mixed Board-a-Match (2) 1974, 1975
  - Smith Life Master Women's Pairs (1) 1976
