= Rita Seamon =

American bridge player (1924–2022)

Rita Shirley Seamon (October 20, 1924 – July 14, 2022) was an American bridge player.

Rita won a North American championship in 1974 playing with her husband William Seamon. She placed second twice in the Women's Pairs playing with her daughter Janice Seamon-Molson.

== Personal life ==
Her husband William Seamon was also a bridge player.

Rita and William had three children: Rick, Michael and Janice. Michael Seamon and Janice Seamon-Molson are both bridge players.

== Bridge accomplishments ==
=== Wins ===
- North American Bridge Championships (1)
  - Chicago Mixed Board-a-Match (1) 1974

=== Runners-up ===
- North American Bridge Championships (3)
  - Wagar Women's Knockout Teams (1) 1996
  - Whitehead Women's Pairs (2) 1961, 1989
