= Eunice Rosen =

American bridge player (1930–2019)

Eunice Manya Rosen (September 6, 1930 – June 5, 2019) was an American bridge player. She was married to fellow bridge champion William Rosen.

In 1958 and in 1966, Eunice and Bill won the Master Mixed Teams, now known as the Chicago Mixed Board-a-Match tournament. In 2000, she won the Whitehead Women's Pairs playing with Joan Stein. Her impressive defensive bridge skills became widely regarded in the bridge community, resulting in a write-up in The New York Times column covering one of her remarkable moves.

In a 1982 New York Times column, Alan Truscott called Eunice Rosen "one of the leading players in the game."

Her parents were Samuel and Marion Berg. Eunice and William Rosen lived in Highland Park, Illinois. They had four children: Marc Jeremy Rosen, Marta Jane Freud, James David Rosen and Gary Andrew Rosen. Eunice Rosen died in Wilmette, Illinois on June 5, 2019, at the age of 88.

== Wins ==
- North American Bridge Championships (3)
  - Master Mixed Teams (2) 1958, 1966
  - Women's Pairs (1) 2000

== Runner-up ==
- North American Bridge Championships (1)
  - Women's Board-a-Match Teams (1) 1972
