= Kitty Cooper =

American bridge player and writer (born 1950)

- Born: 1950 (age 75–76); New York City
- Other names: Kitty Bethe; Kitty Munson; Kitty Munson Cooper
- Occupations: Writer, bridge player, and genetic genealogist
- Known for: Bridge
- Relatives: Hans Bethe
- Website: kittycooper.com

Kitty Cooper born Catherine Anne Munson in 1950 is an American bridge player and genetic genealogist. As a player in bridge tournaments, she has been known also as Kitty Bethe, Kitty Munson, and Kitty Munson Cooper.

== Biography ==
Kitty Cooper was born and raised in New York City and graduated cum laude from Harvard University. As of 2025 she lives in Avon, Connecticut and San Diego with her partner Bart.

She is known as a blogger on genetics and genealogy and does presentations on genetic genealogy. In the past she had a small web development business.

She has son, Paul Bethe, who also used to play competitive bridge, returning from a long break winning his first NABC title playing with his mother.

== Bridge accomplishments ==
=== Wins ===
- Venice Cup (1) 1989
- North American Bridge Championships (8)
  - Rockwell Mixed Pairs (1) 1992
  - Senior and Advanced Senior Master Pairs (1) 1975
  - Machlin Women's Swiss Teams (1) 1989
  - Wagar Women's Knockout Teams (1) 1998
  - Keohane North American Swiss Teams (3) 1987, 1990, 2000
  - Senior Mixed Pairs (1) 2012
  - Freeman Mixed Board-a Match (1) 2025

=== Runners-up ===
- Venice Cup (1) 1995
- North American Bridge Championships (8)
  - Rockwell Mixed Pairs (1) 2006
  - Whitehead Women's Pairs (2) 1998, 2014
  - Machlin Women's Swiss Teams (2) 1984, 1994
  - Sternberg Women's Board-a-Match Teams (1) 1988
  - Chicago Mixed Board-a-Match (2) 1998, 2000
