= John Gerber (bridge) =

American bridge player (1906–1981)

John Gerber (May 18, 1906 – January 28, 1981) was an American bridge player. He is the namesake of the Gerber convention.

Gerber was born in Yelisavetgrad, Russian Empire (now Kropyvnytskyi, Ukraine). He settled in Houston, Texas, where he died in a hospital at age 74.

Gerber was inducted into the ACBL Hall of Fame in 1998.

== Bridge accomplishments ==
=== Honors ===
- ACBL Hall of Fame, 1998

=== Wins ===
- North American Bridge Championships (7)
  - Wernher Open Pairs (1) 1959
  - Hilliard Mixed Pairs (1) 1958
  - Marcus Cup (1) 1955
  - Mitchell Board-a-Match Teams (1) 1953
  - Chicago Mixed Board-a-Match (1) 1964
  - Reisinger (1) 1964
  - Spingold (1) 1954

=== Runners-up ===
- Bermuda Bowl (1) 1961
- North American Bridge Championships
  - Rockwell Mixed Pairs (2) 1953, 1968
  - Wernher Open Pairs (1) 1957
  - Nail Life Master Open Pairs (1) 1974
  - Mitchell Board-a-Match Teams (1) 1960
  - Chicago Mixed Board-a-Match (1) 1967
  - Reisinger (2) 1957, 1959
  - Spingold (1) 1967
