= Whitehead Women's Pairs =

Bridge championship

The Whitehead Women's Pairs bridge championship is held at the spring American Contract Bridge League (ACBL) North American Bridge Championship (NABC).

The Whitehead Women's Pairs is a four-session matchpoint (MP) pairs event with two qualifying and two final sessions. The event typically starts on the second Thursday of the NABC and is restricted to female players.

== History ==
The Whitehead Women's Pairs is an event for partnerships consisting of two female players. There are two qualifying sessions, followed by two final sessions. The contest was held annually at the Summer North American Bridge Championship until 1962. That was changed the following year and subsequently contested at the Spring North American Bridge Championship.

At stake is the Whitehead Trophy, donated in 1930 by Wilbur Whitehead of New York, a great bridge authority and a member of the team that won the Vanderbilt Cup in 1928, the first year it was in play. Whitehead (1866–1931) was president of the Simplex Automobile Company, but bridge held such a fascination for him that he retired from business in 1910 to devote his life to bridge. He was the inventor of many bidding and play conventions, the quick-trick table of card values, the Whitehead system of requirements for original bids and responses and the Whitehead table of preferential leads. Whitehead was instrumental in standardizing procedures in auction bridge and later in contract bridge.

== Winners ==
No Women's Pairs champion has defended its title in more than 50 years, but four early winners did so on seven occasions: 1939, 1942–43, 1948, 1956–58. The four-time winners from 1955 to 1958 were Kay Rhodes and Margaret Wagar.

Whitehead Women's Pairs, 1930 to present
Year	Winners	Runners-up
1930	Olive Peterson, Maud Zontlein	Josephine Culbertson, Elinor Murdoch
1931	Vivi Hanson, Elinor Murdoch	Mary Clement, Olga Hilliard
1932	Mrs. Jay S. Jones, Olive Peterson	Florence Fitch, Maud S. Zontlein
1933	Doris Fuller, Mrs. Courtand Smith	Marie Black, Mary Clement
1934	Helen Bonwit, Helen White	Ruth Sherman, Mrs. Thomas Stern
1935	Bertine Teichman, Mable Ulbrich	Doris Fuller, Olive Peterson
1936	Mrs. Jay S. Jones, Sally Young	Mable Ervin, Doris Fuller
1937	Mable Ervin, Doris Fuller	Martha Lemon, Mrs. Martin R. West
1938	Helen Sobel, Sally Young	Phyllis Gardner, Dorothy Roberts
1939	Helen Sobel, Sally Young	Doris Fuller, Millicent Tansill
1940	Edith Atkinson, Mrs. John Waidlich	Estelle Drescher, Gussie Planco
1941	Mae P. Rosen, Edith Seligman	Ruth Horn, Gussie Planco
1942	Mae P. Rosen, Edith Seligman	Helen Bonwit, Mrs. D. P. Hanson
1943	Mae P. Rosen, Edith Seligman	Olga Hilliard, Evelyn Lebhar
1944	Ruth Sherman, Margaret Wagar	Paula Bacher, Kay Rhodes
1945	Peggy Golder, Olive Peterson	Ruth Sherman, Margaret Wagar
1946	Edith Seligman, Sally Young	Anne Burnstein, Mrs. G. Rosenbaum
1947	Gratian Goldstein, Josephine Gutman	Ruth Sherman, Helen Sobel
1948	Gratian Goldstein, Josephine Gutman	Mildred Cunningham, Mrs. Harry Mason Smith
1949	Kay Rhodes, Ruth Sherman	Mildred Cunningham, Mrs. Harry Mason Smith
1950	Mrs. John Kelly, Dorothy Thompson	Reba Buck, Mrs. George P. Ryan
1951	Alwina M. Dunphy, Mrs. Edward Minear	Mrs. Frank Fooshe, Mrs. Henry C. Wolfe
1952	Shirley Fairchild, Elaine Lee	Mildred Betzler, Mrs. Michael Hoffman
1953	Mrs. Harold P. Swearingen, Barbara Weiner	Gretchen Feldstein, Gratian Goldstein
1954	Margaret Alcorn, Sally Neely	Paula Levin, Mrs. Max Ritter
1955	Kay Rhodes, Margaret Wagar	Mrs. Carl I. Conklin, Paula Nevins
1956	Kay Rhodes, Margaret Wagar	Wynne Ecker, Mrs. P. Halbestadt
1957	Kay Rhodes, Margaret Wagar	Edith Kemp, Terry Michaels
1958	Kay Rhodes, Margaret Wagar	Mrs. N.L. Cassibry, Ann Smith
1959	Betty Adler, Dorothy Hayden	Agnes Gordon, Sylvia Schwartz
1960	Mary Jane Farell, Peggy Solomon	Mabel Mahoney, Betty Ann Welch
1961	Agnes Gordon, Betty Haddad	Mrs. Seymour Keith, Rita Seamon
1962	Clarice Holt, Mrs. Greeley Warner	Kay Carter, Mrs. G.M. Sharum
After 1962, the event was moved from the summer NABC to the spring NABC.
1963	Mrs. K. L. Sargent, Mrs. Ray Tobin	Garner McDaniel, Terry Michaels
1964	Margaret Alcorn, Lucille Patterson	Ruth Ballantyne, Mrs. Lloyd Scott
1965	Nancy Gruver, Sue Sachs	Alicia Kempner, Helen Sobel
1966	Virginia Heckel, Edith Kemp	Garner McDaniel, Terry Michaels
1967	Garner McDaniel, Terry Michaels	Hermine Baron, Marilyn Johnson
1968	Hermine Baron, Rhoda Walsh	2/3. Emma Jean Hawes, Dorothy Hayden; 2/3. Gloria Cohen, Belle Kauffman
1969	Gale Clarke, Gloria Noszka	Sallie Johnson, Bee Schenken
1970	Robin Klar, Tina Rockaway	Jacqui Mitchell, Gail Moss
1971	Amalya Kearse, Jacqui Mitchell	Barbara Brier, Betsey Wolff
1972	Kerri Davis, Rhoda Walsh	Gail Moss, Judi Solodar
1973	Ann Economidy, Vivian Williamson	Mary Anderson, Pamela Eckard
1974	Pat Leary, Jan Stansby	Jacqui Mitchell, Gail Moss
1975	Jacqui Mitchell, Gail Moss	Hermine Baron, Carol Greenhut
1976	Gail Schaab, Barbara Staton	Emma Jean Hawes, Dorothy Truscott
1977	Jacqui Mitchell, Gail Moss	Hermine Baron, Beverly Rosenberg
1978	Babs Charney, Flo Rotman	Edith Kemp, Barbara Rappaport
1979	Anne Burnstein, Edith Kemp	Ann Roberts, Genne Winter
1980	Mildred Boyce, Barbara Norwood	Hermine Baron, Beverly Rosenberg
1981	Emma Jean Hawes, Dorothy Truscott	Roberta Epstein, Rozanne Marel
1982	Hermine Baron, Beverly Rosenberg	Nancy Alpaugh, Betsey Wolff
1983	Evelyn Levitt, Jo Morse	Lynne Pollenz, Sue Picus
1984	Judy Tucker, Jacqui Mitchell	Mildred Breed, Barbara Norwood
1985	Dale Dermer, JoAnne Caplan	Nadine Wood, Robin Taylor
1986	Edith Freilich, Nancy Gruver	Peggy Sutherlin, Sharon Osberg
1987	Tobi Deutsch, Kay Schulle	Carlyn Steiner, Janet Daling
1988	Sally Wheeler, Georgiana Gates	Jan Martel, Dorothy Truscott
1989	Nadine Wood, Jeanne Elkner	Janice Seamon, Rita Seamon
1990	Tobi Deutsch, June Deutsch	Carol Sanders, Betty Ann Kennedy
1991	Leslie Paryzer, Nancy Widman	Claire Tornay, Kathie Walvick
1992	Cheri Bjerkan, Janice Seamon	Carol Sanders, Betty Ann Kennedy
1993	Carol Sanders, Betty Ann Kennedy	Shawn Womack, Jan Cohen
1994	Corinne Kirkham, Ann Kluewer	Bernace DeYoung, Ellasue Chaitt
1995	Lila Perlstein, Juanita Chambers	Ayako Amano, Miho Sekizawa
1996	Nancy Widman, Leslie Paryzer	Susan Wexler, Margie Gwozdzinsky
1997	Susan Wexler, Margie Gwozdzinsky	Suzy Burger, Barbara Sion
1998	Judi Radin, Valerie Westheimer	Carol Simon, Kitty Munson
1999	Harriet Eaton, Ellen Crawford	Mildred Breed, Shawn Quinn
2000	Joan Stein, Eunice Rosen	Marilyn Hemenway, Barbara Fellows
2001	Judi Radin, Sylvia Moss	Tobi Sokolow, Janice Seamon-Molson
2002	Cheri Bjerkan, Sue Weinstein	Kerri Sanborn, Karen McCallum
2003	Joan Eaton, Candace Griffey	Connie Goldberg, JoAnn Sprung
2004	Jacqui Mitchell, Amalya Kearse	Cynthia Balderson, Carole Miner
2005	Gail Greenberg, Laurie Vogel	Helen Abbott, Polly Dunn
2006	Sylvia Moss, Judi Radin	Cathy Strauch, Margie Gwozdzinsky
2007	Irina Ladyzhensky, Kamla Chawla	Valerie Westheimer, Migry Zur Campanile
2008	Lynne Feldman, Chris Benson	Diane Walker, Mickie Kivel
2009	Lisa Berkowitz, Joann Glasson	Hjördis Eythorsdottir, Valerie Westheimer
2010	Suzy Burger, Linda Lewis	Victoria Gromova, Tatiana Ponomareva
2011	Marjorie Michelin, Diana Schuld	Sylvia Moss, Judi Radin
2012	Georgiana Gates, Patricia Norman	Linda Lewis, Joann Glasson
2013	Joanne Weingold, Jan Assini	Irina Ladyzhensky, Kamla Chawla
2014	Ran Jingrong, Wenfei Wang	Kitty Cooper, Lynne Feldman
After 2014, the event was moved from the spring NABC to the fall NABC.
2015	Emily Harrell, Benedicte Cronier	Linda Lewis, Jean Barry
2016	Shawn Quinn, Nancy Passell	Gigi Simpson, Gen Geiger
2017	Katarzyna Dufrat, Justyna Zmuda	Nancy Passell, Petra Hamman
2021	Heather Dhondy, Maggie Knottenbelt	Linda Perlman, Kristen Onsgard
2022	Pamela Nisbet, Brenda Bryant	Karen Lee Barrett, Kathryn Kimmerling
2024	Kristen Onsgard, Nancy Passell	Anam Tebha, Christina Parker

== See also ==
- Smith Life Master Women's Pairs

== Sources ==
- List of previous winners, Page 8. Daily Bulletin (PDF), vol. 52–8, March 20, 2009
- 2009 winners, Page 1. Daily Bulletin (PDF), vol. 52–9, March 21, 2009, archived from the original (PDF) on November 17, 2010
- 2017 winners, Page 1. Daily Bulletin (PDF), vol. 90, November 30, 2017
- "Search Results: Whitehead Womens Pairs". 1930 to present. ACBL. Visit "NABC Winners". Retrieved 2016-12-18.
