= Rockwell Mixed Pairs =

National bridge championship in the USA

The Rockwell Mixed Pairs is a national bridge championship held regularly at the Spring American Contract Bridge League (ACBL) North American Bridge Championship (NABC). The Rockwell Trophy, donated by Helen Rockwell in 1946, is presented to the winners. Originally contested at the Fall NABC, the event was moved to the Spring NABC in 1986.

The event is a four-session matchpoint (MP) pairs event with two qualifying and two final sessions; each pair consists of one male and one female player.

== Winners ==
Five pairs have won twice:

- John Crawford and Margaret Wagar, who won in 1948 and successfully defended in 1949; they also finished second in 1947. Crawford also won with Dorothy Hayden in 1959.
- Sidney Silodor and Helen Sobel, who won in 1955 and successfully defended in 1956. Silodor also won with Edith Rosenbloom in 1941.
- Barry Crane and Kerri Sanborn (then Shuman) won in 1975 and 1982. They finished second in 1971, 1974, and 1977, as Kerri and Stephen Sanborn did in 2008.
- David Berkowitz and Lisa Berkowitz, who won in 1986 and successfully defended in 1987.
- Tom Kniest and Karen Walker won in 2006 and 2009.

Mixed Pairs, 1946 to present
Year	Winners	Runners-up
preceded by the Hilliard Mixed Pairs, from 1931
1946	Anne Burnstein, Al Roth	Charlotte Sidway, Herbert H. Sherman
1947	Evelyn Ansin, Charles Goren	John R. Crawford, Margaret Wagar
1948	John R. Crawford, Margaret Wagar	Charles Johnson, Mrs. Frank Myer
1949	John R. Crawford, Margaret Wagar	Paula Bacher, Peter Leventritt
1950	Peter Leventritt, Ruth Sherman	William Thiemann, Mrs. William Thiemann
1951	Edith Rosenbloom, Sidney Silodor	Edward Burns, Shirley Fairchild
1952	Anne Burnstein, Al Roth	Ella Tilles, Jules Tilles
1953	Jewel Hodge, Paul Hodge	John Gerber, Celeste Mounce
1954	Said Haddad, Betty Windley	Zenobia Allen, John Moran
1955	Sidney Silodor, Helen Sobel	Alicia Kempner, George Rapée
1956	Sidney Silodor, Helen Sobel	Donald Farquaharson, Agnes Gordon
1957	Bee Gale, Howard Schenken	Frances Carter, David Warner
1958	Carol Ross, Edwin Smith	Louis Cohen, Sylvia Stein
1959	John Crawford, Dorothy Hayden	Sidney Lazard, Stella Rebner
1960	Elsie Abrams, William Passell	Peter Johnson, Gladys Kransberg
1961	Art Comstock, Margaret Muirhead	Charles J. Solomon, Peggy Solomon
1962	Clarice Holt, Paul Levitt	Peggy Jean Berry, John Sutherlin
1963	Agnes Gordon, Eric Murray	Barbara Brier, Jerry Brier
1964	Dan Morse, Mary Margaret Swan	Margaret Alcorn, Peter Pender
1965	Betty Kaplan, Edgar Kaplan	Malvine Klausner, Morris Portugal
1966	Robert Sharp, Louise Sharp	Gertrude Blasband, Sylvester Lowery
1967	Gertrude Machlin, Kit Woolsey	Kathie Cappelletti, Mike Cappelletti
1968	Marilyn Johnson, Peter Rank	John Gerber, Carol Klar
1969	Peggy Parker, Steve Parker	Evelyn Levitt, Dave Treadwell
1970	George Dawkins, Carolyn Flournoy	Mary Chilcote, Larry Weiss
1971	Eugenie Mathe, Lew Mathe	Barry Crane, Kerri Davis
1972	John Mohan, Peggy Sutherlin	Leland Ferer, Gratian Goldstein
1973	Bernie Chazen, Marilyn Johnson	Kenneth Cohen, Helen Smith
1974	Gerald Caravelli, Helen Utegaard	Barry Crane, Kerri Shuman
1975	Barry Crane, Kerri Shuman	Sandi Leavitt, Paul Sugar
1976	Peggy Lipsitz, Steve Parker	Nancy Gruver, Lee Rautenberg
1977	Joel Friedberg, Nancy Gruver	Barry Crane, Kerri Shuman
1978	Ahmed Hussein, Gail Moss	Dave McClintock, Janet McClintock
1979	Juanita Skelton, Mike Smolen	Carol Sanders, Tommy Sanders
1980	Jeff Meckstroth, Patty Meckstroth	Hemant Lall, Jan Lall
1981	Esta Van Zandt, Jim Zimmerman	2/3: Charlie Dorn, Bonnie LaRochelle; 2/3: Bart Bramley, Judy Wadas
1982	Barry Crane, Kerri Shuman	Mike Passell, Nancy Passell
1983	John Gustafson, Helen Gustafson	Benito Garozzo, Lea Dupont
1984	Kathy Sulgrove, Larry Rock	Audrey Rennels, Ron Von der Porten
1985	Beth Palmer, Steve Robinson	Patricia Hassett, Steve Garner
After 1985 the Rockwell Mixed Pairs was moved from the Fall to the Spring NABC meet.
1986	Lisa Berkowitz, David Berkowitz	Laurie Kranyak, Phil Becker
1987	Lisa Berkowitz, David Berkowitz	Juanita Chambers, Jim Robison
1988	Claire Tornay, Michael Moss	Susan Green, Mike Cappelletti
1989	Dorothy Truscott, Alan Truscott	Sandra Low, Marc Low
1990	JoAnn Manfield, Ken Cohen	Adair Gellman, Ravindra Murthy
1991	JoAnn Manfield, Danny Sprung	Judy Tucker, Jim Becker
1992	Kitty Bethe, Larry Mori	Linda Lee, Ray Lee
1993	Libby Fernandez, Happoldt Neuffer	Sabine Zenkel, Ron Andersen
1994	Jill Blanchard, Geoff Hampson	Kay Schulle, John Sutherlin
1995	Cindy Bernstein, Bob Bernstein	Kay Larsen, Chris Larsen
1996	Margery Tamres, Joseph Brady	Anne Simon, Arnie Fisher
1997	Phyllis Quinn, Wafik Abdou	Shirley Blum, George Whitworth
1998	Joan Eaton, Leslie Amoils	Craig Jacobson, Barbara Lehman
1999	Shannon Lipscomb, Mike Cappelletti Jr.	Anne Arndt, Godfrey Chang
2000	Linda Gordon, Bernie Chazen	Fred Hamilton, Rhoda Walsh
2001	Barbara Shaw, Mark Shaw	Terry Michaels, Gary Roberts
2002	Linda Webb, Richard Ekstrum	Gary Cohler, Barbara Kasle
2003	Jim Kirkham, Corinne Kirkham	Jay Baum, Kathy Baum
2004	Peggy Kaplan, Bill Kent	Marty Fleisher, Rozanne Pollack
2005	John Kranyak, Laurie Kranyak	Lynn Deas, Alan Stout
2006	Karen Walker, Tom Kniest	Kitty Cooper, Steven Cooper
2007	Mildred Breed, Richard Zeckhauser	Jane Teel, Robert Teel Jr.
2008	Gail Greenberg, Jeffrey Hand	Kerri Sanborn, Stephen Sanborn
2009	Karen Walker, Tom Kniest	Craig Robinson, Elaine Landow
2010	Scott Levine, Judi Radin	Dan Jacob, Brenda Keller
2011	Lloyd Arvedon, Carolyn Sessler	Gail Greenberg, Jeff Hand
2012	Pat McDevitt, Sheila Gabay	Bernace De Young, Richard Reitman
2013	Paul Lewis, Linda Lewis	Barbara Lehman, Craig Jacobson
2014	Richard Coren, Janice Seamon-Molson	Beth Bromberg, John Bromberg
2015	Susan Stubinski, Bruce Wick	Sheila Gabay, Lloyd Arvedon
2016	Jenni Carmichael, Greg Humphreys	Stephen Sanborn, Kerri Sanborn
2017	Igor Savchenko, Cristal Nell	Daniel Rubinfeld, Judi Radin
2022	Jacek Pszczola, May Sakr	

== See also ==
- Hilliard Mixed Pairs, predecessor 1931 to 1945

== Sources ==
- 1946–2011 winners. Manley, Brent; Horton, Mark; Greenberg-Yarbro, Tracey; Rigal, Barry, eds. (2011). The Official Encyclopedia of Bridge - Biographies and Results (compact disk) (7th ed.). Horn Lake, MS: American Contract Bridge League. p. 281. ISBN 978-0-939460-99-1.
- 2012 winners. Daily Bulletin (PDF), vol. 55–7, March 22, 2012, p. 1
- 2013 winners. Daily Bulletin (PDF), vol. 56–7, March 21, 2013, p. 1
- 2014 winners. Daily Bulletin (PDF), vol. 57–7, March 27, 2014, p. 1, archived from the original (PDF) on October 21, 2014
