= Sidney H. Lazard =

American businessman and bridge player

Sidney Herold Lazard (December 18, 1930 – November 3, 2015) was an American business leader in the oil and gas industries and a champion contract bridge player. He attended Tulane University and was a lifelong New Orleans resident until 2001, when he moved to Dallas, Texas.

Lazard was inducted into the ACBL Hall of Fame in 2000.

== Sidney H. Lazard, Jr. Sportsmanship Award ==
In 2001, Lazard established the Sidney H. Lazard, Jr. Sportsmanship Award in honor of his son, who died in 1999 after battling cancer. The annual award celebrates sportsmanlike characteristics and aims to recognize those who "play hard but fair and hold no grudges."

I designed the award as a way to honor his memory by recognizing top bridge players who emulate the ideal that I saw in my son, and to encourage all players to aspire to that standard.

— Sidney Lazard

The 2016 recipient was Boye Brogeland.

== Bridge accomplishments ==
=== Honors ===
- ACBL Hall of Fame, 2000

=== Wins ===
- North American Bridge Championships (14)
  - Blue Ribbon Pairs (1) 2002
  - North American Pairs (1) 1990
  - Vanderbilt (1) 1970
  - Mitchell Board-a-Match Teams (1) 1977
  - Chicago Mixed Board-a-Match (5) 1963, 1977, 1978, 1979, 1982
  - Reisinger (2) 1960, 1997
  - Spingold (3) 1954, 1958, 1968

=== Runners-up ===
- North American Bridge Championships
  - Rockwell Mixed Pairs (1) 1959
  - Wernher Open Pairs (2) 1967, 1997
  - Nail Life Master Open Pairs (1) 2001
  - Open Pairs (1928-1962) (1) 1957
  - Grand National Teams (2) 1987, 2004
  - Jacoby Open Swiss Teams (1) 1983
  - Vanderbilt (2) 1967, 1994
  - Mitchell Board-a-Match Teams (4) 1954, 1956, 1961, 1965
  - Chicago Mixed Board-a-Match (1) 1961
  - Reisinger (3) 1968, 1969, 1975
  - Spingold (2) 1966, 1973
