= Sally Young =

American bridge player (1905–1970)

Sarah L. Sheppard "Sally" Young (January 1905 – February 27, 1970) was an American bridge player from Philadelphia who won many important tournaments in the 1930s and 1940s. She was the first woman and 17th player to achieve the American Contract Bridge League (ACBL) rank of Life Master (ACBL Life Master).

== Early life and education ==
Young was born in Pennsylvania, one of eight children born to George and Marcella Sheppard (née Stehr). Her paternal grandparents were born in Ireland, and her mother's grandparents were born in England.

== Career ==
Young began playing bridge at 15 and was self taught until Charles Goren took her under his tutelage. Young was one of several strong players from the Philadelphia area who contended for "national championships" (ACBL) during the 1930s–40s— including her four 1939 Reisinger teammates, below.

With John R. Crawford, Goren, and Charles J. Solomon, Young won the Chicago Trophy (now Reisinger) teams-of-four championship in 1937, 1938, and 1939. (They played as a fivesome with B. Jay Becker in 1939.) In 1947 she teamed with three other women—Jane Jaeger, Kay Rhodes and Paula Ribner—and they shared the title with two other teams. (The Reisinger does not break ties. It was the first of 6 ties in 85 renditions to 2013.) It remains the only win, albeit shared, for an all-women team—the only win in North America in any major open teams competition.

Young and Helen Sobel won the annual North American women pairs championship (now Whitehead Women's Pairs) in 1938 and again in 1939. That year she became the first woman to achieve the rank of ACBL Life Master; Sobel became the second in 1941. (They were 17th and 25th overall, of whom the first twelve preceded ACBL.)

From 1943 to 1946, Young teamed with Emily Folline, Helen Sobel, and Margaret Wagar to win the women teams (Sternberg Women's Board-a-Match Teams, now a knockout format named for Wagar) four years in a row.

=== Awards and recognition ===
Young was inducted into the American Contract Bridge League's Hall of Fame in 2001. One of about 20 ACBL permanent trophies is named for Young. It is awarded annually to the winner of the Young LM–1500 Pairs tournament.

== Personal life ==
She married Ralph C. Young in 1926. They had one son, Ralph Jr.

== Death ==
She was living in Narberth, Pennsylvania at the time of her death in 1970 at Lankenau Medical Center, age 65.

== Bridge accomplishments ==
=== Honors ===
- ACBL Hall of Fame 2001

=== Wins ===
- North American Bridge Championships (22)
  - Whitehead Women's Pairs (4) 1936, 1938, 1939, 1946
  - Hilliard Mixed Pairs (1) 1940
  - Open Pairs (1928-1962) (1) 1941
  - Wagar Women's Knockout Teams (7) 1937, 1939, 1943, 1944, 1945, 1946, 1951
  - Chicago Mixed Board-a-Match (5) 1938, 1941, 1949, 1950, 1959
  - Reisinger (4) 1937, 1938, 1939, 1947

=== Runners-up ===
- North American Bridge Championships (8)
  - Hilliard Mixed Pairs (1) 1934
  - Wagar Women's Knockout Teams (4) 1941, 1955, 1956, 1958
  - Chicago Mixed Board-a-Match (2) 1936, 1947
  - Spingold (1) 1939
