= Marilyn Johnson =

American bridge player

Marilyn Kinsman Johnson (February 18, 1928 – October 31, 2007) was an American bridge player from Houston, Texas. She won three world championships, one at women pairs and two at women teams, all in partnership with Mary Jane Farell. Farell and Johnson also won the North American von Zedtwitz Life Master Pairs in 1978, which no other pair of women has done (1930 to 2014).

Johnson, a native of Rutland, Vermont, majored in chemistry at Wellesley College and worked 33 years for Shell Oil. She died in Houston, aged 79.

== Bridge accomplishments ==
=== Wins ===
- North American Bridge Championships (8)
  - von Zedtwitz Life Master Pairs (1) 1978
  - Rockwell Mixed Pairs (2) 1968, 1973
  - Hilliard Mixed Pairs (1) 1957
  - Wagar Women's Knockout Teams (4) 1970, 1974, 1975, 1976

=== Runners-up ===
- North American Bridge Championships
  - Whitehead Women's Pairs (1) 1967
  - Wagar Women's Knockout Teams (1) 1973
  - Chicago Mixed Board-a-Match (1) 1969
