= Harold Harkavy =

American bridge player

Harold Harkavy (November 29, 1915 – November 29, 1965) was an American bridge player, considered one of the world's best at declarer play.

He was originally from New York City, and served in Italy and Africa in World War II. He later lived in Miami Beach, Florida.

Harkavy was married to Marie Franko Harkavy and had a son, Robert. Harkavy died on his 50th birthday of pancreatitis in a French Hospital in San Francisco, where he had gone for the Fall National Championships.

Harkavy was inducted into the ACBL Hall of Fame in 2004.

== Bridge accomplishments ==
=== Honors ===
- ACBL Hall of Fame, 2004

=== Wins ===
- North American Bridge Championships (11)
  - Wernher Open Pairs (1) 1953
  - Vanderbilt (1) 1963
  - Marcus Cup (1) 1946
  - Chicago Mixed Board-a-Match (4) 1952, 1953, 1955, 1957
  - Reisinger (1) 1952
  - Spingold (3) 1953, 1956, 1963

=== Runners-up ===
- North American Bridge Championships
  - Wernher Open Pairs (1) 1952
  - Blue Ribbon Pairs (1) 1963
  - Mitchell Board-a-Match Teams (1) 1952
  - Chicago Mixed Board-a-Match (2) 1947, 1964
  - Reisinger (2) 1945, 1964
