= Stella Rebner =

American bridge player

Stella Rebner is an American bridge player.

== Bridge accomplishments ==
=== Wins ===
- North American Bridge Championships (5)
  - Barclay Trophy (2) 1952, 1953
  - Chicago Mixed Board-a-Match (1) 1963
  - Wagar Women's Knockout Teams (2) 1957, 1962

=== Runners-up ===
- World Olympiad Women's Teams Championship (1) 1964
- North American Bridge Championships (1)
  - Rockwell Mixed Pairs (1) 1959
