= Lew Mathe =

American bridge player

Lewis Lawrence Mathe (March 27, 1915 – March 10, 1986) was an American world champion bridge player and administrator from Canoga Park, California.

Mathe, a native of New York, served in the Army during World War II; he enlisted two days before the attack on Pearl Harbor. He died in Los Angeles in 1986. He was inducted into the ACBL Hall of Fame in 1997.

== Bridge accomplishments ==
=== Honors ===
- ACBL Hall of Fame, 1997

=== Awards ===
- Herman Trophy (1) 1957
- Mott-Smith Trophy (3) 1959, 1964, 1967

=== Wins ===
- Bermuda Bowl (1) 1954
- North American Bridge Championships (19)
  - von Zedtwitz Life Master Pairs (2) 1963, 1967
  - Rockwell Mixed Pairs (1) 1971
  - Silodor Open Pairs (1) 1959
  - Blue Ribbon Pairs (1) 1964
  - Open Pairs (1928-1962) (1) 1957
  - Vanderbilt (3) 1964, 1966, 1967
  - Mitchell Board-a-Match Teams (3) 1957, 1962, 1970
  - Chicago Mixed Board-a-Match (1) 1970
  - Reisinger (4) 1959, 1960, 1962, 1971
  - Spingold (2) 1953, 1954

=== Runners-up ===
- Bermuda Bowl (3) 1955, 1962, 1966
- North American Bridge Championships
  - Silodor Open Pairs (2) 1964, 1967
  - Wernher Open Pairs (1) 1961
  - Blue Ribbon Pairs (1) 1967
  - Hilliard Mixed Pairs (1) 1959
  - Nail Life Master Open Pairs (1) 1982
  - Vanderbilt (1) 1963
  - Mitchell Board-a-Match Teams (1) 1972
  - Chicago Mixed Board-a-Match (2) 1953, 1975
  - Reisinger (1) 1966
  - Spingold (2) 1971, 1974
