= Pamela Nisbet =

Canadian/New Zealand bridge player (born 1953)

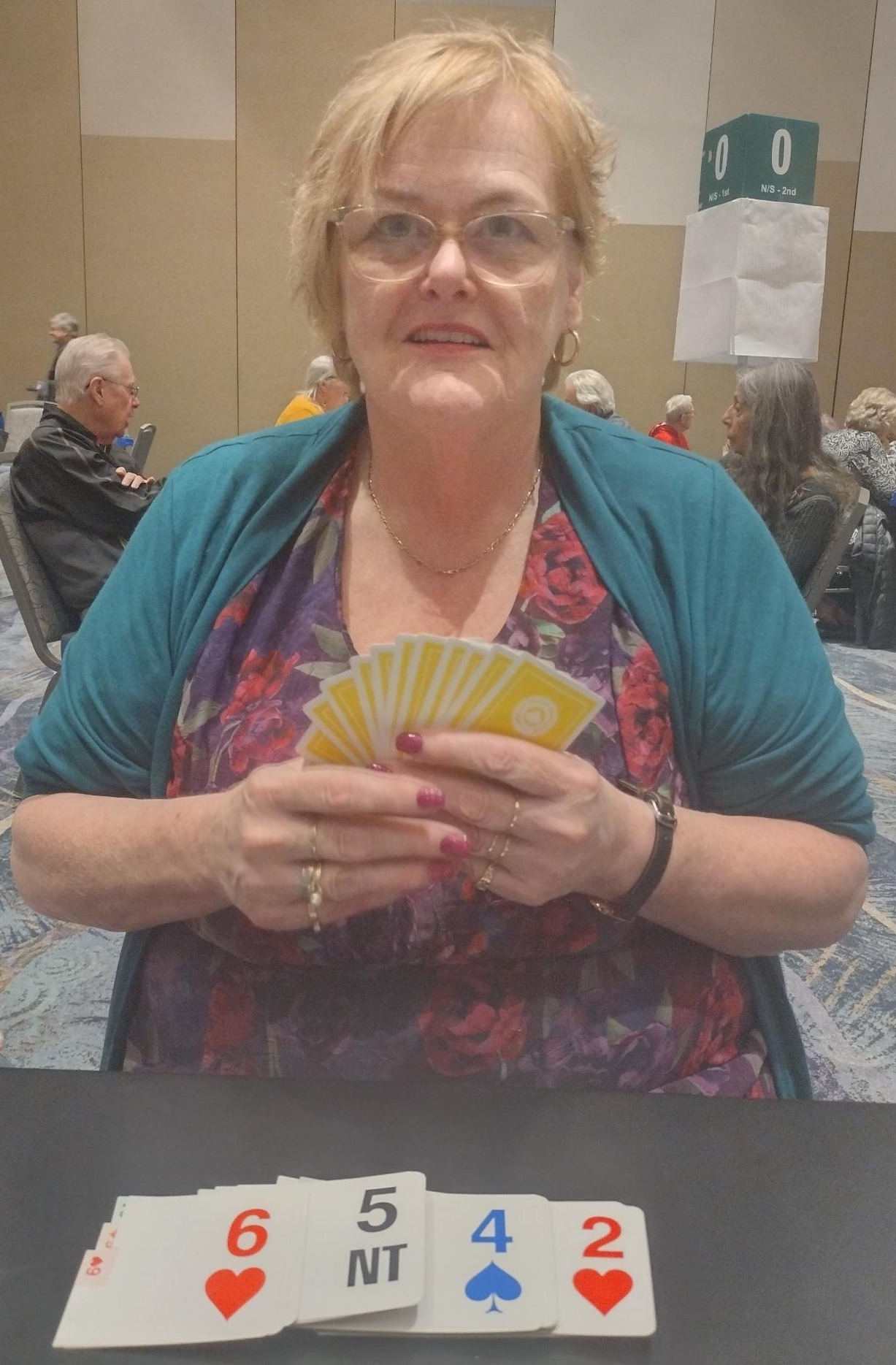
- Born: Pamela Adam; 12 December 1953 (age 72); Dunedin, New Zealand

Pamela Nisbet is a Canadian/New Zealand North American champion bridge player. She has dual Canadian/New Zealand citizenship and has represented Canada many times in international competition.

== Bridge accomplishments ==
=== Wins ===
- North American Bridge Championships (1)
  - Whitehead Women's Pairs (1) 2022

== Personal life ==
Nisbet was born in New Zealand. She is one of six children of William Oswald Adam and Evelyn Mary Guilford. Her father was the oldest of thirteen and left school at 10 and late became a hairdresser and tobacconist.

Nisbet left New Zealand to move to Canada and became a Canadian citizen. She moved back to Dunedin, New Zealand in 2021.

She is divorced and has two grown daughters.
