= Brenda Bryant =

Canadian bridge player (born 1956)

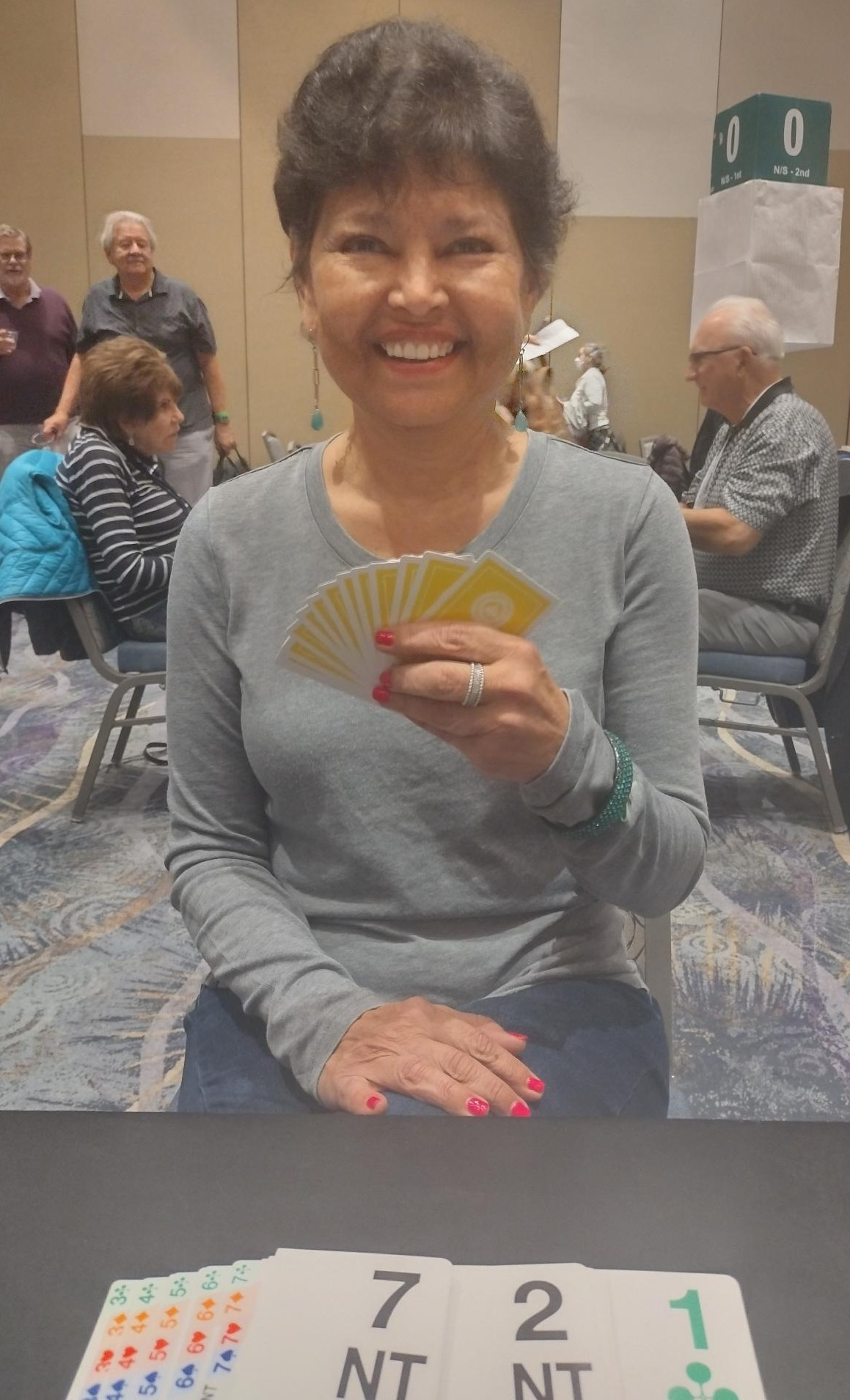

Brenda Bryant is a Canadian North American champion bridge player.

== Bridge accomplishments ==
=== Wins ===
- North American Bridge Championships (1)
  - Whitehead Women's Pairs (1) 2022

== Personal life ==
Bryant has a Phd in psychology from Michigan State University in the United States.

Bryant started the first Masters of Social Justice at Marygrove College in Detroit, Michigan, United States. Bryant now teaches at Wayne State in Detroit.
