= Kay Schulle =

American bridge player

Kay Schulle is an American bridge player.

== Bridge accomplishments ==
=== Wins ===
- Venice Cup (1) 1993
- North American Bridge Championships (7)
  - Machlin Women's Swiss Teams (2) 1991, 1993
  - Sternberg Women's Board-a-Match Teams (2) 1991, 2005
  - Wagar Women's Knockout Teams (2) 1985, 1989
  - Whitehead Women's Pairs (1) 1987

=== Runners-up ===
- North American Bridge Championships (7)
  - Jacoby Open Swiss Teams (1) 2001
  - Machlin Women's Swiss Teams (2) 1988, 1995
  - Rockwell Mixed Pairs (1) 1994
  - Wagar Women's Knockout Teams (2) 1990, 1993
  - von Zedtwitz Life Master Pairs (1) 1990

=== Discipline for Cheating, 2020 ===
Schulle and playing partner Gerald Sosler were found guilty of cheating by the American Contract Bridge League (ACBL) Online Ethical Oversight Committee in August 2020 for "failing to disclose partnership agreements with intent to deceive..." They were suspended for six months, put on probation for a further six months and forfeited masterpoints won during three events on Bridge Base Online (BBO).
