= Kay Rhodes =

American bridge player (1910–1996)

Kathryn Mary "Kay" Rhodes (March 22, 1910 – June 19, 1996) was an American bridge player of New York City and later Rohnert Park, California.

Rhodes was born in Washington, DC, on March 22, 1910, to parents with surnames Vandekoolwyk (father) and Friesman. She died in Sonoma, California, on June 19, 1996.

Rhodes teamed with three other women—Paula Bacher (later Ribner), Jane Jaeger, and Sally Young—in the 1947 National Board-a-Match Teams championship, played for the Chicago Trophy (now the Reisinger Board-a-Match Teams or simply the Reisinger). They shared the title with two other teams and it remains the only win, albeit shared, for any all-women team in North America's three major open teams-of-four tournaments—Reisinger, Spingold, and Vanderbilt.

Rhodes and Margaret Wagar won the Whitehead Women's Pairs four years in succession, 1955 to 1958.

== Bridge accomplishments ==
=== Wins ===
- North American Bridge Championships (6)
  - Whitehead Women's Pairs (5) 1949, 1955, 1956, 1957, 1958
  - Reisinger (1) 1947

=== Runners-up ===
- North American Bridge Championships
  - Whitehead Women's Pairs (1) 1944
  - Wagar Women's Knockout Teams (7) 1952, 1953, 1954, 1955, 1956, 1957, 1958
  - Chicago Mixed Board-a-Match (1) 1942
