= Jovanka Smederevac =

Austrian bridge player

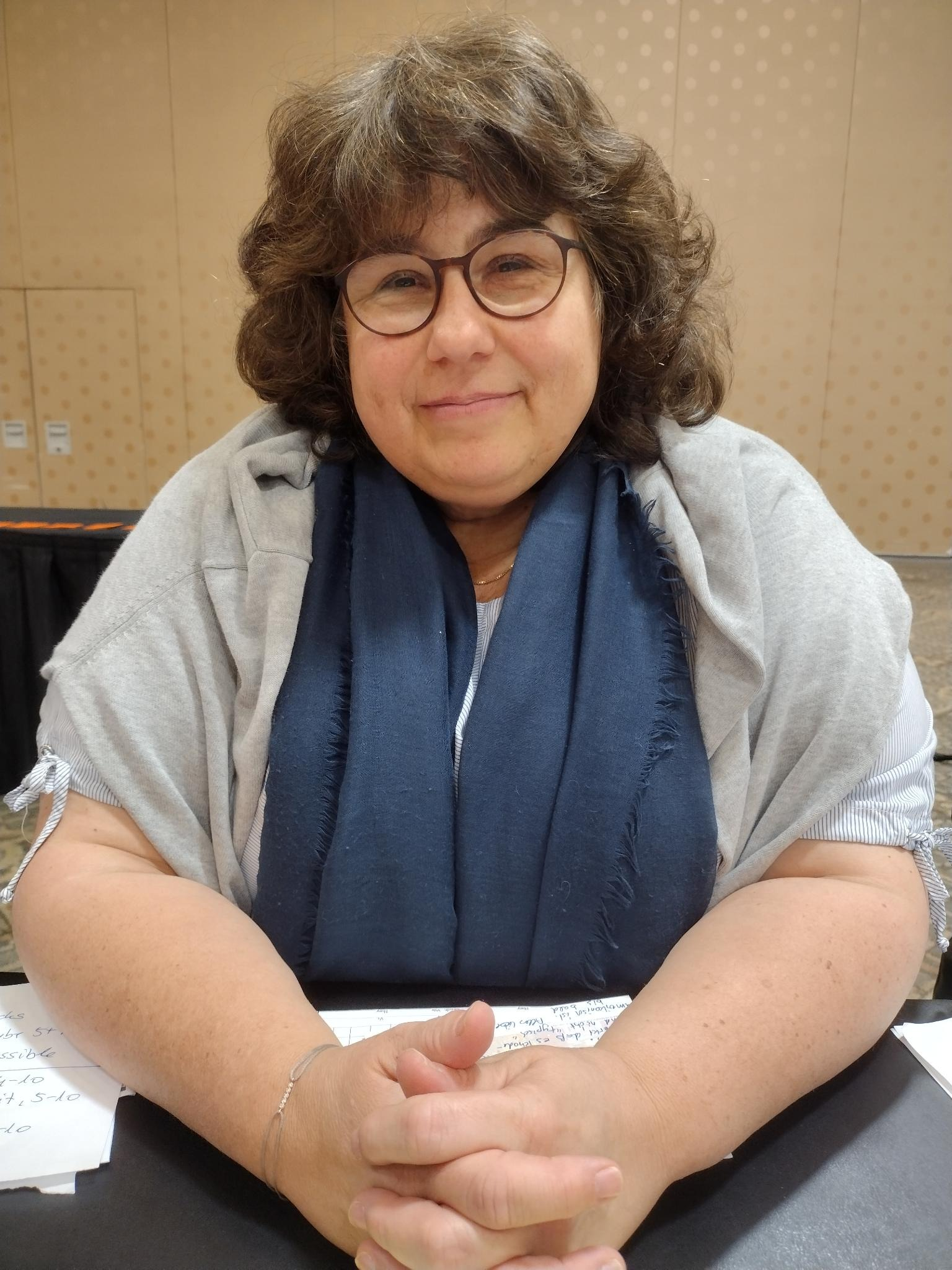

Jovanka Smederevac was an Austrian world champion bridge player until 2015, when she got expelled from the ÖBV (Austrian Bridge Association) for misconduct, which she disputes. Subsequently she has represented the French Bridge Federation.

== Bridge accomplishments ==
=== Wins ===
- World Team Olympiad (1) 1992
- European Transnationals Mixed Teams (1) 2013
- European Transnationals Women Pairs (1) 2013
