= Hilliard Mixed Pairs =

National bridge championship

The Hilliard Mixed Pairs national bridge championship was last held at the spring American Contract Bridge League (ACBL) North American Bridge Championship (NABC).

== History ==
This was the original national mixed pairs event. It was contested at the summer NABC the first two years. It moved to the fall NABC in 1933 until it was replaced by the Rockwell Mixed Pairs in 1946. However, it continued to be contested at Bridge Week until 1957. It was contested at the newly created Spring NABC from 1958 to 1962 .

== Winners ==
When this was the premier event for mixed pairs, before 1946, no pair defended its title successfully, or even won the trophy twice. Only a few players won it twice. Two pairs did win the Hilliard trophy more than once after it was downgraded in status: Kay and James Dunn, three times, Helen and Morris Portugal twice, all during the five-year span 1951 to 1955. Mary Jane and Arnold Kauder won in 1949 and finished second in 1950 and 1957. Married couples did not generally dominate the event, however.

All listings are "ladies first".

Hilliard Mixed Pairs, 1931 to 1962
Year	Winners	Runners-up
1931	Mrs. Jay S. Jones Jr., Lewis R. Ayres	Elinor Murdoch, Oswald Jacoby
1932	Frances B. Newman, Charles Lochridge	Mrs. Evelyn C. Kaiser, B. Jay Becker
1933	Margaret Wagar, Fred Levy	Helen White, J. C. McClelland
1934	Mrs. Theodore Greenbaum, Richard Kahn	Sally Young, Charles Goren
1935	Hortense Evans, Louis J. Haddad	Florence Stratford, Maury J. Glick
1936	Mrs. D. M. Healy, Wingate Bixby	Mrs. L. Heiner, Arthur Glatt
1937	Mrs. Sam Rush, Harry Fishbein	Mrs. H. E. Latter, Jesse Slutt
1938	Mrs. Sam Rush, Fred Kaplan	Lottie Zetosch, Robert Appleyard
1939	Florence Stratford, Lewis H. Fremont	Louise Wainwright, Oswald Jacoby
1940	Sally Young, Sidney Silodor	Helen Sobel, Robert A. McPherran
1941	Vera Glick, Jeff Glick	Ann Bryant, Harry Feinberg
1942	Ruth Sherman, Harry Fishbein	Olive Peterson, John R. Crawford
1943	Olive Peterson, Charles Goren	Peggy Golder, Charles J. Solomon
1944	Helen Sobel, Sidney Silodor	Josephine Gutman, Peter Leventritt
1945	Margaret Wagar, John R. Crawford	Marjorie Perlmutter, Irving Deuter
After 1945 this Hilliard Trophy event was replaced as North American mixed pairs championship by the Rockwell Mixed Pairs.
1946	Paula Bacher, Harry Fishbein	Mrs. Norman Perlstein, Norman Perlstein
1947	Betty Bysshe, Meyer Schleifer	Helen Cale, Jack Ehrlenbach
1948	Verna Leonard, E. Miller	Harriet Rethers, Dan Westerfield
1949	Mary Jane Kauder, Arnold Kauder	Mrs. H. J. Murphy, H. J. Murphy
1950	Venita Street, Robert Street	Mary Jane Kauder, Arnold Kauder
1951	Helen Portugal, Morris Portugal	Allyn G. Whitehead, Dan Westerfield
1952	Kay Dunn, James Dunn	Malvine Klausner, Edward Frischauer
1953	Helen Portugal, Morris Portugal	Mrs. Harry Bierman, Harry Bierman
1954	Kay Dunn, James Dunn	Mrs. M. Lorber, E. Hatcher
1955	Kay Dunn, James Dunn	Hortense Evans, Barry Crane
1956	Ruth Million, John Hancock	Jan Stone, Tobias Stone
1957	Marilyn Johnson, Bob Adams	Mary Jane Kauder, Arnold Kauder
After 1957 the Hilliard Trophy event was restored to North American championship status, but secondary to the Rockwell.
1958	Phyllis Novak, John Gerber	Jane Clunie, Dr. William A. Clunie
1959	Mary Jane Farell, Al Roth	2/3. Eugenie Mathe, Lew Mathe; 2/3. Clara Watanabe, Ivan Erdos
1960	Shirlee Harris, Ed Rosen	Mrs. Benton Brandon, John E. Simon
1961	Carol Sanders, Tommy Sanders	Hermine Baron, Robert F. Jordan
1962	1/2. Shirlee Harris, Ed Rosen; 1/2. Jesse Cook, Grant Marsee	

== See also ==
- Rockwell Mixed Pairs, successor as premier event

== Sources ==
- The Official Encyclopedia of Bridge, 6th edition. American Contract Bridge League. 2002. ISBN 0-943855-44-6.
- "Search Results: Mixed Pairs (Hilliard)". 1931 to 1962. ACBL. Visit "NABC Winners"; select a Discontinued NABC. Retrieved 2014-06-04.
