= Kerri Sanborn =

American bridge player

Sharon Lou "Kerri" Sanborn (born July 29, 1946) is an American bridge player from New York City. She has won major tournaments as Kerri Davis and Kerri Shuman as well. Sometime prior to the 2014 European and World meets (summer and October), Sanborn ranked 25th among 73 living Women World Grand Masters by world masterpoints (MP) and 7th by placing points that do not decay over time.

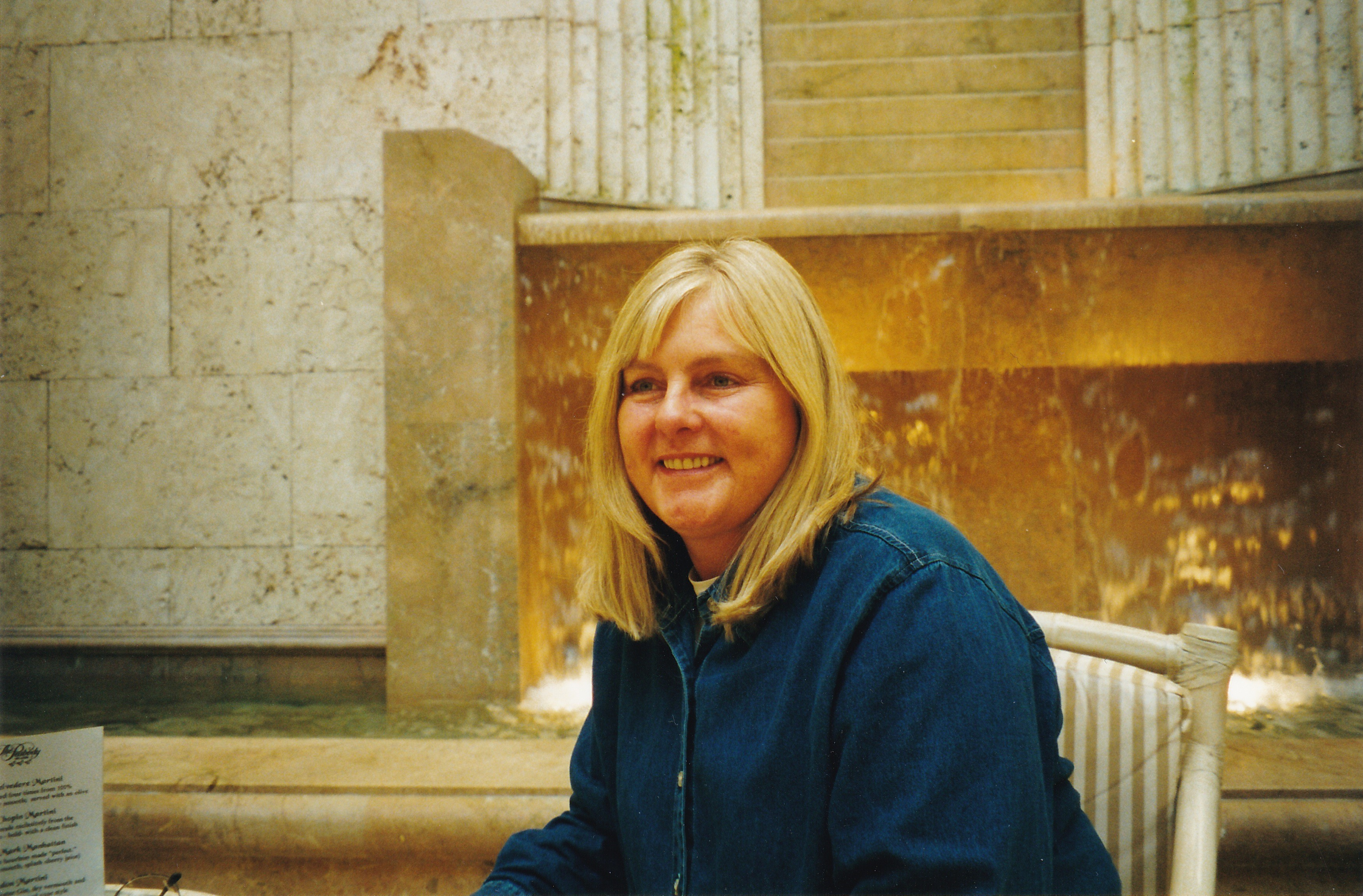
Sharon Lou "Kerri" Sanborn

As Kerri Shuman during 1974, Sanborn earned the greatest number of masterpoints in American Contract Bridge League-sanctioned play, and thus won the ACBL McKenney Trophy. No woman since then has won the annual masterpoints race, which is now recognized by the Barry Crane Trophy after her longtime masterpoints partner Barry Crane. Sanborn (as Shuman) and Crane won the World Bridge Federation's third quadrennial World Mixed Pairs Championship in 1978. In 1990 she was the only woman invited to compete in a special WBF par contest for individuals; in effect, an examination set by experts for experts.

Sanborn was inducted into the ACBL Hall of Fame in 2007.

Sanborn was one of 24 women, six from each of four countries (as for men), invited to participate in the SportAccord World Mind Games, December 2011 in Beijing. Her partner was Irina Levitina, at least for the Pairs.

Sanborn and Jack Zhao of China, who sometimes lives and frequently plays in North America, won the 13th quadrennial World Mixed Pairs Championship in Sanya, China, October 2014. Thus she became the first player to win the gold medal twice, and he became the first player from outside Europe and North America to win any medal.

== Bridge accomplishments ==
=== Awards and honors ===
- ACBL McKenney Trophy, 1974
- ACBL Hall of Fame, 2007

=== Wins ===
- Venice Cup (2) 1989, 1993
- World Mixed Pairs Championship (2) 1978, 2014
- North American Bridge Championships (20)
  - Rockwell Mixed Pairs (2) 1975, 1982
  - Whitehead Women's Pairs (1) 1972
  - Smith Life Master Women's Pairs (1) 2003
  - Machlin Women's Swiss Teams (6) 1989, 1990, 1993, 2001, 2007, 2012
  - Wagar Women's Knockout Teams (5) 1978, 2003, 2005, 2008, 2010
  - Sternberg Women's Board-a-Match Teams (2) 2006, 2008
  - Chicago Mixed Board-a-Match (3) 1980, 1987, 1990

=== Runners-up ===
- Venice Cup (2) 1995, 2009
- World Mixed Pairs Championship (1) 1986
- North American Bridge Championships
  - Rockwell Mixed Pairs (4) 1971, 1974, 1977, 2008
  - Whitehead Women's Pairs (1) 2002
  - Blue Ribbon Pairs (1) 1987
  - Smith Life Master Women's Pairs (2) 1985, 1986
  - Machlin Women's Swiss Teams (3) 1983, 2008, 2013
  - Wagar Women's Knockout Teams (3) 1974, 1986, 2014
  - Sternberg Women's Board-a-Match Teams (2) 2001, 2002
  - Chicago Mixed Board-a-Match (1) 1994
  - Reisinger (1) 1989
