= Margaret Wagar =

American bridge player (1902–1990)

Margaret Wagar (April 6, 1902 – January 6, 1990) was an American bridge player from Delaware, Ohio and Atlanta, Georgia.

== Biography ==
The premier American Contract Bridge League (ACBL) annual championship for women teams since 1976 is the Wagar Women's Knockout Teams, named for Wagar. Previously it was the Women's Board-a-Match Teams, which she won six times including four in a row from 1943 to 1946 with identical teammates Emily Folline, Helen Sobel, and Sally Young. Her teams also finished second or tied for second ten times in 15 years from 1950 to 1964! Wagar also won the premier championship for women pairs four years in a row with Kay Rhodes, the 1955 to 1958 Whitehead Women's Pairs tournaments (and were partners on the runner-up women team seven years in a row from 1952 to 1958). She and Sobel won the Fall National Open Pairs in 1947 and 1948; she and John Crawford won the Rockwell Mixed Pairs in 1948 and 1949. (The Fall National was one of several "national championships" for open pairs; the Rockwell was and is the major championship for mixed pairs.)

Olive Peterson and Wagar became ACBL Life Masters number 36 and 37 in 1943, the fourth and fifth women to achieve the rank after Sally Young, Helen Sobel, and Peggy Solomon. They had been the two women on the 1942 champion mixed team.

Wagar retired from bridge competition in 1978. She had lived in Atlanta most of her life and she was honored by Atlanta bridge players on August 31, 1982. At that time Alan Truscott (New York Times bridge columnist and continuing editor of The Official Encyclopedia of Bridge) credited her with 27 "national titles", which he believed to be the greatest number for any living woman. In a column three months after her 1990 death, however, he credited her with 24—with comment only that they included two of "the prestigious Spingold Knockout Teams".

Wagar was inducted into the ACBL Hall of Fame in 1999.

As a competitive bridge player at least during the 1940s she was sometimes covered under the names Mrs. Margaret W. Wagar and Mrs. Wilkinson Wagar of Atlanta. In one 1944 society column of The Atlanta Constitution, "Margaret (Mrs. Wilkinson) Wagar" appears in two of the three items.

== Bridge accomplishments ==
=== Honors ===
- ACBL Hall of Fame, 1999

=== Wins ===
- North American Bridge Championships (26)
  - Rockwell Mixed Pairs (2) 1948, 1949
  - Whitehead Women's Pairs (5) 1944, 1955, 1956, 1957, 1958
  - Hilliard Mixed Pairs (2) 1933, 1945
  - Open Pairs (1928-1962) (2) 1947, 1948
  - Smith Life Master Women's Pairs (1) 1962
  - Wagar Women's Knockout Teams (6) 1940, 1943, 1944, 1945, 1946, 1967
  - Chicago Mixed Board-a-Match (5) 1942, 1945, 1948, 1954, 1964
  - Reisinger (1) 1941
  - Spingold (2) 1946, 1948

=== Runners-up ===
- North American Bridge Championships
  - von Zedtwitz Life Master Pairs (1) 1943
  - Rockwell Mixed Pairs (1) 1947
  - Whitehead Women's Pairs (1) 1945
  - Wagar Women's Knockout Teams (10) 1950, 1952, 1953, 1954, 1955, 1956, 1957, 1958, 1963, 1964
  - Chicago Mixed Board-a-Match (5) 1933, 1944, 1949, 1950, 1962
