= Charles Goren =

American bridge player and writer

Charles Henry Goren (March 4, 1901 – April 3, 1991) was an American bridge player and writer who significantly developed and popularized the game. He was the leading American bridge personality in the 1950s and 1960s and widely known as "Mr. Bridge".

== Early years ==
Goren was born in what is now Khotyn, Ukraine, then part of the Russian Empire, to a Jewish family. His parents were Jacob and Rebecca Goron, a writer and a homemaker. His father emigrated in 1903 with the family possibly coming later. He earned a law degree at McGill University in Montreal in 1923. While he was attending McGill, a girlfriend (or "a young hostess") laughed at his ineptness at the game of bridge, thus motivating him to immerse himself in a study of existing bridge materials.

After graduation, he practiced law for 13 years in Philadelphia. The growing fame of contract bridge player Ely Culbertson, however, prompted Goren to abandon his original career choice to pursue bridge competitions, where he attracted the attention of Milton Work, an American authority on many card games including contract bridge. Work was impressed by Goren's knowledge of the game and hired Goren to help him write his bridge articles and columns.

Work was one of many strong bridge players based in Philadelphia around the 1920s. By 1928 he had popularized the 4–3–2–1 point count system for evaluating balanced hands (now sometimes called the Work count). His chief assistant Olive Peterson and young Goren established a partnership as players.

After the publication of Winning Bridge Made Easy in 1936, Goren gave up on practicing law. As a player, Goren's "breakthrough" was the 1937 Board-a-Match Teams championship (now called The Reisinger National Bridge Championship) which he won with three other Philadelphia players: John Crawford, Charles Solomon, and Sally Young.

Goren dominated the competitive bridge circuit. In 1950, he became world champion at the Bermuda Bowl. By 1958, he had earned 5,791 master points, was earning about $150,000 per year, and was profiled in a Time magazine cover story. He would place runner-up in 1956 and 1957. He won the Spingold knock-out teams championship in 1947 and 1960, the Vanderbilt in 1944 and 1945, and won other national victories, and national runner-up on 21 occasions. He remained a competitive player until about 1962 after which he focused on writing and teaching bridge.

== Bridge contributions ==
After Milton Work died in 1934, Goren began his own bridge writing career and published the first of his many books on playing bridge, Winning Bridge Made Easy, in 1936. Drawing on his experience with Work's system, Goren quickly became popular as an instructor and lecturer.

Goren's books have sold millions of copies (especially Winning Bridge Made Easy and Contract Bridge Complete); by 1958 his daily bridge column was appearing in 194 American newspapers. He also had a monthly column in McCall's and a weekly column in Sports Illustrated.

His television program, Championship Bridge with Charles Goren, was broadcast from 1959 to 1964 on the ABC network. It featured numerous appearances by top players and segments with celebrity guests such as Chico Marx, Alfred Drake, and Forest Evashevski, among others.

Goren's longest partnership was with Helen Sobel, but he also famously partnered actor Omar Sharif. Sharif also wrote introductions to or co-authored several of Goren's bridge books, and was also co-author of Goren's newspaper column, eventually taking it over in collaboration with Tannah Hirsch.

The Bridge World monthly magazine, established by Ely Culbertson in 1929, named nine members to its bridge hall of fame including Goren and Culbertson between the years 1964 and 1966. In 1994, the ACBL established its hall of fame with the Bridge World nine as founding members. It named eight new members in 1995 and has inducted others annually since then.

=== Point count system ===
As he continued writing, Goren began to develop his point count system, based on the Milton Work point count, as an improvement over the existing system of counting "honor tricks". Goren, with assistance, formulated a method of combining the Work count, which was based entirely on high cards, and various distributional features. This may well have improved the bidding of intermediate players and beginners almost immediately.

=== Four-card suits ===
Goren also worked to continue the practice of opening four-card suits, with an occasional three-card club suit when the only four-card suit was a weak major. In this, he was following the practice established by Ely Culbertson in the early 1930s. Later on, he continued this practice, resisting the well-known five-card majors approach that has become a major feature of modern Standard American bidding.

Opening a four-card suit can improve the chances of the partnership identifying a four-four trump fit, and the four-card approach is still used by experts today, notably by most Acol players. It is claimed that the drawback of the four-card approach is that the Law of Total Tricks is more difficult to apply in cases where it is used. However, the five-card majors approach became popular before the Law of Total Tricks was propounded.

=== Other contributions ===
In addition to his pioneering work in bringing simple and effective bridge to everyday players, Goren also worked to popularize the Precision bidding method, which is one of many so-called big club or strong club systems (which use an opening bid of one club to indicate a strong hand).

Tribune Content Agency distributes the daily column Goren Bridge, written by Bob Jones, using the Goren method.

== Legacy ==
Goren died on April 3, 1991, in Encino, California, at the age of 90. He had lived with his nephew Marvin Goren for 19 years. While few players "play Goren" exactly today, the point-count approach he popularized remains the foundation for most bidding systems.

The New York Times published Alan Truscott's obituary of Goren nine days after his death, as the lead article of page A17 (Obituaries) across five of its six columns. "INSIDE", on page 1 of the same issue, includes the listing:

Charles Goren Dies at 90
He was Mr. Bridge to millions of players and readers who adopted his simplified bidding system. Page A17.

The layout for Truscott's obituary incorporates a two-column box by the staff entitled "Goren on Bridge: Counting Points", which cites New Contract Bridge in Nutshell and Encyclopædia Britannica. Its preface: "Here are the basics of the point-counting system used to bid bridge hands. Although the practice of assigning points to high cards was already in use, Charles H. Goren expanded and popularized the method, which has remained the standard point-counting system."

During the month of Goren's death, Truscott followed his obituary with a bridge column entitled, "Goren leaves behind many fans and a column with an international flavor". His business interests had been "managed by others" since his retirement "a quarter of a century ago", according to Truscott. "The Goren syndicated column now has an international flavor: It carries the bylines of the movie star Omar Sharif, an Egyptian who lives in Paris, and an entrepreneur, Tannah Hirsch, a South African who came to the United States via Israel."

Goren appeared on the Groucho Marx radio and television game show You Bet Your Life in March 1958.

Goren appeared on the television game show What’s My Line in December 1961.

== Bridge accomplishments ==
=== Honors ===
- ACBL Hall of Fame, 1964
- ACBL Honorary Member of the Year, 1959

=== Awards ===
- McKenney Trophy 1937, 1943, 1945, 1947, 1948, 1949, 1950, 1951
- Precision Award (Best Article or Series on a System or Convention) 1974

=== Wins ===
- Bermuda Bowl (1) 1950
- North American Bridge Championships (32)
  - Vanderbilt (2) 1944, 1945
  - Asbury Park Trophy (now Spingold) (1) 1937
  - Spingold (5) 1943, 1947, 1951, 1956, 1960
  - Chicago (now Reisinger) (8) 1937, 1938, 1939, 1942, 1943, 1950, 1957, 1963
  - Men's Board-a-Match Teams (1) 1952
  - Master Mixed Teams (6) 1938, 1941, 1943, 1944, 1948, 1954
  - Life Master Pairs (2) 1942, 1958
  - Fall National Open Pairs (1) 1940
  - Men's Pairs (3) 1938, 1943, 1949
  - Rockwell Mixed Pairs (1) 1947
  - Hilliard Mixed Pairs (1) 1943
  - Master Individual (1) 1945

=== Runners-up ===
- Bermuda Bowl (2) 1956, 1957
- North American Bridge Championships (21)
  - Vanderbilt (8) 1934, 1936, 1949, 1950, 1953, 1955, 1959, 1962
  - Spingold (2) 1939, 1950
  - Chicago (now Reisinger) (2) 1944, 1951
  - Men's Board-a-Match Teams (2) 1946, 1955
  - Master Mixed Teams (4) 1946, 1949, 1950, 1951
  - Life Master Pairs (1) 1953
  - Men's Pairs (1) 1935
  - Hilliard Mixed Pairs (1) 1934

== Publications ==
- Winning Bridge Made Easy: a simplified self-teaching method of contract bidding combining all the principles of the new Culbertson system with the principal features of the four aces system (Harrisburg, PA: The Telegraph Press, 1936), 92 pp., LCCN 36-14872
- Better Bridge for Better Players: the play of the cards, introduction by Ely Culbertson, foreword by George S. Kaufman (Doubleday, Doran, 1942), 538 pp. LCCN 42-25653; also known as The Standard Book of Play: better bridge for better players, OCLC 647336

The earliest British edition in WorldCat records is Better Bridge for Better Players: the standard book of play, intro. Culbertson, fwd. Kauffman (London: Walter Edwards, 1947), OCLC 836591784

- The Standard Book of Bidding (Doubleday, 1944), 299 pp. LCCN 44-9061; (Doubleday, 1947), 310 pp. LCCN 47-3052
- Contract Bridge in a Nutshell (Doubleday, 1946), 128 pp. LCCN 46-6423; at least seven editions to 1986 under the titles Contract Bridge in a Nutshell [CBN], New CBN, Goren's New CBN, or Charles Goren's New CBN
- Contract Bridge Made Easy, a self-teacher (Doubleday, 1948), 95 pp. – "Replaces the author's Winning bridge made easy, first pub. in 1936 and now out of print." LCCN 48-7366
- Point Count Bidding in Contract Bridge. New York: Simon & Schuster. 1949. p. 150. First London edition published by Eyre & Spottiswoode in 1951. Title has been revised and reprinted numerous times to 1984.
- Contract Bridge for Beginners. New York: Simon & Schuster Inc. 1953. p. 152. OCLC 12428312.. First London edition published by Eyre & Spottiswoode in 1959. Title has been reprinted numerous times to 1972.
- with Jack Olsen: Bridge is My Game: Lessons of a Lifetime. Garden City, NY: Doubleday & Company, Inc. 1965. p. 190. LCCN 65022040.. Paperback editions published by Cornerstone Library, NY in 1967 and 1970, pp. 190.
- 100 Challenging Bridge Hands
- An Entirely New Bridge Summary
- The A.B.C.'s of Contract Bridge
- Championship Bridge with Charles Goren
- Charles H. Goren's Bridge Quiz Book
- Contract Bridge Complete
- Easy Steps: Eight Steps to Winning Bridge
- The Elements of Bridge
- The Fundamental of contract Bridge
- Goren on Play and Defense: All of Play: The Technique, the Logic, and the Challenge of Master Bridge
- Goren Presents the Italian Bridge System
- Goren Settles the Bridge Arguments
- Goren's Bridge Complete
- Goren's Bridge Quizzes
- Goren's Hoyle Encyclopedia of Bridge
- Goren's New Contract Bridge Complete
- Goren's Point Count Bidding Made Easy
- Goren's Winning Partnership Bridge
- Introduction to Bridge
- Introduction to Competitive Bidding
- Modern Backgammon Complete
- Official Charles Goren Quick Reference to Winning Bridge
- Play and Defense
- Play As You Learn Bridge
- Play Bridge With Goren
- Play Winning Bridge With Any Partner: Even a Stranger
- Precision Bridge for Everyone
- The Precision System of Bidding
- Precision System of Contract Bridge Bidding: Charles H. Goren Presents
- Sports Illustrated Book of Bridge
