= Barry Crane =

American producer, director, and bridge player

- Born: Barry Cohen; November 10, 1927; Detroit, Michigan, U.S.
- Died: July 5, 1985 (aged 57); Los Angeles, California, U.S.
- Occupation(s): Television director Television producer
- Years active: 1957–1985
- Spouse: Mrs. Crane

Barry Crane (born Barry Cohen; November 10, 1927 – July 5, 1985) was a prolific television producer and director, and a bridge player who, at the time of his death had "won more titles than anyone else in the history of the game". According to the American Contract Bridge League (ACBL), he was "widely recognized as the top matchpoint player of all time" —the tournament format commonly played in private clubs. In 1985 Crane was murdered, a crime that was solved in 2021.

== Early life ==
Barry Cohen was born 1927 in Detroit, Michigan, and was later sometimes credited under his birth name. In the mid-1950s he moved to Hollywood and changed his name for professional reasons. He produced The Magician, and was an associate producer on several episodes of Mission: Impossible. He was credited with directing numerous episodes of such series as Trapper John, M.D., The Incredible Hulk, Hawaii Five-O, CHiPs, Dallas, Wonder Woman, Mission: Impossible, and Mannix.

== Bridge competition ==
Crane, who won 15 North American championships, was an ACBL Grand Life Master and traveled extensively to play in matchpoint pairs tournaments. In World Bridge Federation (WBF) competition he and Kerri Sanborn won the fourth quadrennial World Mixed Pairs Championship in 1978. In North America he also played in teams-of-four tournaments (where the strategy is subtly different from matchpoint play) and won numerous regional titles. His teams reached the Vanderbilt final in 1951 and 1985, his first and last high finishes in North America-level events.

During his lifetime, Crane accumulated 35,135.80 masterpoints (awarded by the ACBL for success in tournament play), more than any other player. Second-placed Paul Soloway was approximately 11,000 behind at Crane's death in 1985 and passed him only in 1991. In honor and as a memorial to Crane, the ACBL renamed the award given to the player who accumulates the most masterpoints in a single year to the Barry Crane Trophy, and the list of high masterpoint attainers to the Barry Crane Top 500. Crane was elected to the ACBL Hall of Fame in 1995.

== Murder ==
Crane was murdered on July 5, 1985, a homicide that went unsolved for 34 years. His body was "found bludgeoned shortly before 3 P.M. in the garage of his luxury town home in Studio City", apparently dragged to the garage from his apartment, according to the police. That week he had been playing daily in the annual Pasadena regional knockout teams bridge tournament; his team won the Saturday final with Kerri Shuman, one of Crane's favorite partners, as his replacement.

The Integrated Automated Fingerprint Identification System led to a suspect in Crane's murder being taken into custody on May 9, 2019, based on fingerprint and DNA evidence linking him to the crime; additionally, according to a statement from the Los Angeles Police Department (LAPD), the suspect confessed to murdering Crane during an interview with LAPD detectives on March 8, 2019.

Edwin Jerry Hiatt pled guilty on October 7, 2021 to voluntary manslaughter of Crane. Hiatt was sentenced to 12 years in state prison.

== Bridge accomplishments ==
=== Honors ===
- ACBL Hall of Fame, 1995

=== Awards ===
- McKenney Trophy 1952, 1967, 1971, 1973, 1975, 1978
- Mott-Smith Trophy 1970, 1971
- Oeschger Trophy 1961, 1962, 1963, 1967
- Stoddard Memorial Trophy 1980
- IBPA Award (Personality of the Year) 1985

=== Wins ===
- World Mixed Pairs (1) 1978
- North American Bridge Championships (15)
  - North American Swiss Teams (1) 1978
  - North American Men's Swiss Teams (1) 1983
  - Master Mixed Teams (1) 1980
  - West Coast Master Mixed Teams (2) 1953, 1954
  - Open Pairs (7) 1964, 1970, 1971, 1972, 1974, 1977, 1983
  - Men's Pairs (1) 1966
  - Rockwell Mixed Pairs (2) 1975, 1982

=== Runners-up ===
- North American Bridge Championships (11)
  - Vanderbilt (2) 1951, 1985
  - Men's Board-a-Match Teams (2) 1956, 1971
  - Master Mixed Teams (1) 1969
  - Open Pairs (2) 1976, 1984
  - Rockwell Mixed Pairs (3) 1971, 1974, 1977
  - Hilliard Mixed Pairs (1) 1955
