= Charles J. Solomon =

American bridge expert (1906–1975)

- Born: March 12, 1906
- Died: May 1, 1975 (age 69)
- Occupations: Bridge player, Administrator, Writer and Sponsor
- Spouse: Margery Mastbaum Golder
- Family: Jules Mastbaum (father-in-law)

Charles Julius Solomon (March 12, 1906 – May 1, 1975) was an American bridge player, administrator, writer, and sponsor. He was Inducted into the ACBL Hall of Fame in 2000.

== Biography ==
Solomon was from Philadelphia, Pennsylvania and an attorney, though he eventually left law to play bridge full-time. In 1948, he married Margery "Peggy" Golder (née Mastbaum), the daughter of philanthropist Jules Mastbaum. Peggy was recently widowed following the death of her first husband, former U.S. Congressman Benjamin M. Golder (who served from 1925–1933) in 1933 and was looking for someone to teach her the game; he soon became her bridge mentor and eventually her husband. She became the third female ACBL Life Master and they were the subjects of a newspaper feature in 1960, "The Solomons: Top Married Bridge Team".

In world championship teams-of-four competition, Solomon was a member of the 6-man USA squad in the 1956 Bermuda Bowl. Not yet a tournament, it was a long head-to-head match between representatives of North America and Europe, won by France.

Charles Solomon died in Philadelphia, aged 69. He was survived by his wife and two stepdaughters, Joan Golder Ash and Norma Golder Brunswick.

== Published books ==
- No Trump Bidding (Woodstown, NJ: Seven Stars Press, 1947), 48 pp. – "Rev., enl. ed." –OCLC 44909721
- Slam Bidding and Point Count, Solomon and Bennett L. Disbrow (Philadelphia: Macrae Smith, 1951), 281 pp., LCCN 51-9194
- How to Bid and What to Lead, Solomon and Disbrow (Macrae Smith, 1953), 128 pp., LCCN 52-11860
- Hold Our Bridge Hands, Solomon and Bert Wilson (Philadelphia: Lefax Publ., 1969), 140 pp., OCLC 2556583

== Bridge accomplishments ==
=== Honors ===
- ACBL Hall of Fame, 2000

=== Wins ===
- North American Bridge Championships (14)
  - Master Individual (1) 1947
  - von Zedtwitz Life Master Pairs (1) 1946
  - Wernher Open Pairs (1) 1943
  - Marcus Cup (1) 1967
  - Mitchell Board-a-Match Teams (2) 1952, 1965
  - Chicago Mixed Board-a-Match (3) 1949, 1950, 1959
  - Reisinger (4) 1937, 1938, 1939, 1944
  - Spingold (1) 1955

=== Runners-up ===
- North American Bridge Championships
  - Master Individual (1) 1943
  - von Zedtwitz Life Master Pairs (1) 1938
  - Rockwell Mixed Pairs (1) 1961
  - Silodor Open Pairs (2) 1959, 1968
  - Hilliard Mixed Pairs (1) 1943
  - Nail Life Master Open Pairs (1) 1963
  - Open Pairs (1928-1962) (1) 1956
  - Vanderbilt (2) 1954, 1958
  - Mitchell Board-a-Match Teams (2) 1955, 1960
  - Chicago Mixed Board-a-Match (2) 1939, 1940
  - Reisinger (2) 1953, 1959
  - Spingold (1) 1939
