= Peter Leventritt =

American bridge player

Peter A. Leventritt
- Born: October 5, 1915; New York, New York
- Died: December 6, 1997 (aged 82); New York, New York
- Known for: bridge player

Peter A. Leventritt (October 5, 1915 – December 6, 1997) was an American bridge player, president of the American Contract Bridge League (ACBL) for 1945–1946. Leventritt was from New York City.

Leventritt was inducted into the ACBL Hall of Fame in 2002.

== Bridge accomplishments ==
=== Honors ===
- ACBL Hall of Fame, 2002

=== Wins ===
- North American Bridge Championships (13)
  - von Zedtwitz Life Master Pairs (2) 1944, 1951
  - Rockwell Mixed Pairs (1) 1950
  - Vanderbilt (2) 1953, 1964
  - Chicago Mixed Board-a-Match (3) 1949, 1950, 1959
  - Reisinger (3) 1941, 1949, 1963
  - Spingold (2) 1956, 1960

=== Runners-up ===
- North American Bridge Championships
  - Master Individual (1) 1952
  - Rockwell Mixed Pairs (1) 1949
  - Hilliard Mixed Pairs (1) 1944
  - Open Pairs (1928-1962) (2) 1948, 1951
  - Vanderbilt (6) 1946, 1947, 1955, 1959, 1962, 1967
  - Mitchell Board-a-Match Teams (1) 1955
  - Chicago Mixed Board-a-Match (1) 1947
  - Reisinger (2) 1943, 1953
