= Meyer Schleifer =

American bridge player

Meyer Schleifer (February 9, 1908 – June 15, 1994) was an American bridge player from Los Angeles, California.

Schleifer was born in Brooklyn, New York City, one of five children born to Jewish emigrant parents Jacob Schleifer and Anna Frankel, born in Romania or the Russian Empire. He was a strong chess player as a teenager. He contracted tuberculosis as a law student at Columbia University, whence he quit school and moved to Denver for his health. He moved to Los Angeles a few years later, and won two Southern California Chess Championships before he switched to bridge. For most of his life, he earned a living at the bridge table, primarily by playing rubber bridge for money stakes at clubs. According to Eddie Kantar, who judged him "America's greatest bridge player" in 1972, Schleifer did have many clients at duplicate bridge, or tournament play, and could have become rich if he had not been a heavy loser betting on the horse races. Another bridge writer described Schleifer in 1971 as "one of the country's leading players for over two decades", and wrote that "people never get rich doubling Meyer Schleifer." Schleifer won many bridge tournaments, and represented the US in the first World Team Olympiad contract bridge world championship. Alfred Sheinwold wrote in 1987: "Many connoisseurs think Meyer Schleifer of Los Angeles, is the best card player in the game. Since he has seen more than 70 summers, he qualifies as one of the Living Legends of Bridge." Schleifer's games still featured in newspaper bridge columns many years after his death.

Schleifer was inducted into the ACBL Hall of Fame in 2000.

== Bridge accomplishments ==
=== Honors ===
- ACBL Hall of Fame von Zedtwitz Award, 2000

=== Wins ===
- North American Bridge Championships (6)
  - von Zedtwitz Life Master Pairs (1) 1966
  - Hilliard Mixed Pairs (1) 1947
  - Barclay Trophy (1) 1947
  - Mitchell Board-a-Match Teams (1) 1957
  - Reisinger (1) 1959
  - Spingold (1) 1953

=== Runners-up ===
- North American Bridge Championships
