= John R. Crawford =

American backgammon and bridge player

John Yocum Randolph Crawford
- Born: August 4, 1915; Bryn Mawr, Pennsylvania
- Died: February 14, 1976 (aged 60); Manhattan
- Occupations: Bridge and Backgammon Player

John Yocum Randolph Crawford (August 4, 1915 – February 14, 1976) was an American bridge and backgammon player.

In bridge, he was a member of United States teams that won the first three Bermuda Bowls, or world teams championships, in 1950, 1951 and 1953; a wholly new team represented the US in 1954. In backgammon, Crawford is known as the inventor of the "Crawford rule", a regulation that restricts use of the doubling die in match play.

== Life ==
Of Scots descent, the younger son of Andrew Wright Crawford Sr. (1873–1929), a town planner, he was born at Bryn Mawr, Pennsylvania, and died in Manhattan aged 60. He was married to Carol Stolkin, née Ross, also a celebrated backgammon player.

== Books ==
- Canasta (New York: JCS Associates, 1950; London: Faber, 1951)
- Samba, three-deck canasta (Doubleday, 1951)
- How to be a consistent winner in the most popular card games (Doubleday, 1953); revised 1961
- Contract bridge (Grosset & Dunlap, 1953), Crawford assisted by Fred L. Karpin
- Calypso: how to play and win the fascinating new card game (Doubleday, 1955)
- The backgammon book (Viking Press, 1970), Oswald Jacoby and Crawford

The latter was soon translated.

- Das Backgammonbuch, German transl. by Jens Schmidt-Prange and Suzanne Gangloff (Munich: Keyser, 1974)
- Le livre du backgammon, French transl. by René Orléan, 1975

== Bridge accomplishments ==
=== Honors ===
- ACBL Hall of Fame, 1995

=== Awards ===
- Fishbein Trophy 1952, 1957
- Herman Trophy 1953

=== Wins ===
- Bermuda Bowl (3) 1950, 1951, 1953
- North American Bridge Championships (37)
  - Vanderbilt (9) 1941, 1946, 1950, 1951, 1955, 1956, 1957, 1959, 1960
  - Spingold (5) 1943, 1948, 1950, 1952, 1957
  - Chicago (now Reisinger) (10) 1937, 1938, 1939, 1942, 1946, 1947, 1953, 1954, 1956, 1961
  - Men's Board-a-Match Teams (2) 1956, 1961
  - Master Mixed Teams (4) 1942, 1945, 1948, 1957
  - Life Master Pairs (1) 1943
  - Men's Pairs (1) 1939
  - Rockwell Mixed Pairs (3) 1948, 1949, 1959
  - Hilliard Mixed Pairs (1) 1945
  - Master Individual (1) 1956

=== Runners-up ===
- Bermuda Bowl (1) 1958
- North American Bridge Championships (27)
  - Vanderbilt (1) 1952
  - Spingold (4) 1939, 1947, 1955, 1961
  - Chicago (now Reisinger) (2) 1948, 1950
  - Men's Board-a-Match Teams (4) 1946, 1948, 1959, 1973
  - Master Mixed Teams (6) 1944, 1949, 1950, 1952, 1973, 1975
  - Life Master Pairs (5) 1938, 1941, 1947, 1952, 1956
  - Men's Pairs (1) 1953
  - Rockwell Mixed Pairs (1) 1947
  - Hilliard Mixed Pairs (1) 1942
  - Master Individual (2) 1951, 1958

== See also ==
- Clan Crawford
