= Helen Sobel Smith =

American bridge player

- Born: Helen Elizabeth Martin; May 22, 1909; Philadelphia, Pennsylvania
- Died: September 11, 1969 (aged 60); Detroit, Michigan
- Occupation: Bridge player
- Spouses: Jack White (m. 1927; div. 1930) Alexander M. Sobel (m. 1937; div. 1945) Stanley Smith (m. 1966)

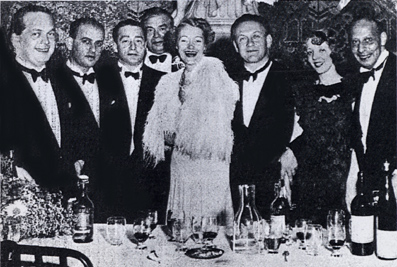
The winning Austria open team at the 1937 world championships: Karl Schneider, Hans Jellinek, Edouard Frischauer, Paul Stern (captain), Josephine Culbertson (US), Walter Herbert, Helen Sobel (US), and Karl von Blöhdorn. Missing: Udo von Meissl.

Helen Elizabeth Sobel Smith (née Martin; May 22, 1909 – September 11, 1969) was an American bridge player. She is said to have been the "greatest woman bridge player of all time" . She won 35 North American Bridge Championships, and was the first woman to play in the Bermuda Bowl. She was a longtime bridge partner of Charles Goren.

== Biography ==
Smith was born Helen Martin in Philadelphia, Pennsylvania to Cornelius and Ethel Martin (née Murphy). Her father, whose own father had emigrated from England, was working as a machinist when Helen was born in 1909. She had an older sister, Dorothy, who was five years old when Helen was born.

Helen was a chorus girl in her youth. By age 16, she had performed with the Marx Brothers in shows including The Cocoanuts and Animal Crackers. She only knew only how to play pinochle and Casino until another chorus girl taught her bridge.

She became known for her bridge playing in the mid-1930s, winning her first national championship in 1934. After a brief marriage to Jack White that ended in 1930, she married bridge player Alexander M. Sobel (1901–1972), a former vaudeville performer who found work in the Depression as a tournament director. Though she and Sobel divorced in 1945, she achieved most of her success under the name Helen Sobel.

Helen Sobel and Sally Young won the annual North American women pairs championship (now Whitehead Women's Pairs) in 1938 and again in 1939. In 1938, Young became the first woman to achieve the rank of ACBL Life Master; Sobel became the second in 1941. (They were 17th and 25th overall, of whom the first twelve preceded ACBL.)

From 1943 to 1946, Sobel teamed with Young, Emily Folline, and Margaret Wagar and won the women teams championship four years in a row (Sternberg Women's Board-a-Match Teams, now a knockout format named for Wagar).

She married Stanley Smith in 1966 and retired for two years. She died in a Detroit hospital at the age of 60. The monthly ACBL Bulletin remembered her as a player "without a peer among women and very few peers among men. Helen played like a man, it was true. But she also played like a lady."

Sobel Smith was inducted into the ACBL Hall of Fame in 1995, when the League established that honor by adding eight names to a list of nine whom The Bridge World had recognized in the 1960s. She was then the only woman of the 17. Her Hall of Fame citation paraphrases and quotes The Bridge World editor and publisher Edgar Kaplan: "Helen's style was frisky and aggressive – so aggressive that 'some of her male partners were intimidated. These guys felt they were playing in the Mixed Pairs and they were the girl."

"In my lifetime", Kaplan wrote, "she is the only woman bridge player who was considered the best player in the world. She knows how to play a hand."

== Bridge accomplishments ==
=== Honors ===
- ACBL Hall of Fame, 1995

=== Awards ===
- McKenney Trophy 1941, 1942, 1944
- Fishbein Trophy 1958

=== Wins ===
- North American Bridge Championships (35)
  - Vanderbilt (2) 1944, 1945
  - Spingold (5) 1944, 1947, 1951, 1956, 1960
  - Chicago (now Reisinger) (4) 1941, 1943, 1950, 1957
  - Master Mixed Teams (6) 1941, 1943, 1944, 1948, 1954, 1968
  - Women's Board-a-Match Teams (7) 1935, 1936, 1939, 1943, 1944, 1945, 1946
  - Life Master Pairs (2) 1942, 1958
  - Fall National Open Pairs (3) 1940, 1947, 1948
  - Rockwell Mixed Pairs (2) 1955, 1956
  - Hilliard Mixed Pairs (1) 1944
  - Women's Pairs (3) 1934, 1938, 1939

=== Runners-up ===
- IBL World Championship (1) 1937
- Bermuda Bowl (1) 1957
- North American Bridge Championships (31)
  - Vanderbilt (7) 1942, 1949, 1950, 1953, 1955, 1959, 1962
  - Spingold (2) 1943, 1950
  - Chicago (now Reisinger) (2) 1944, 1951
  - Master Mixed Teams (4) 1946, 1949, 1950, 1951
  - Women's Board-a-Match Teams (10) 1937, 1941, 1942, 1950, 1952, 1954, 1955, 1956, 1957, 1958
  - Life Master Pairs (1) 1953
  - Fall National Open Pairs (1) 1938
  - Hilliard Mixed Pairs (2) 1933, 1940
  - Women's Pairs (2) 1947, 1965

== Publications ==
- All the Tricks New York: Greenberg, 1949, 245 pp. – "With post-mortems by Charles H. Goren and Howard Dietz." LCCN 49-10646

British edition, Winning Bridge (London: P. Davies, 1950), All the Tricks OCLC 8911985
Revised edition, All the Tricks (New York: Cornerstone Library, 1961), 186 pp. – " 'I find I had to do very little changing or revising or updating.'—Foreword." OCLC 316832771
