= McConnell Cup =

Part of the Women's World Bridge Series Championships

McConnell Cup is a team event for women held every four years as part of the World Bridge Series Championships. The event was inaugurated in 1994 and is named in honor of Ruth McConnell, former treasurer for the World Bridge Federation (WBF) and former president of the American Contract Bridge League (ACBL). McConnell was also instrumental in inaugurating the Venice Cup women's team championship in 1974.

The full name of this championship is World Women Knockout Teams. The knockout format pertains only to the late stages, however, evidently a four-round knockout with 16 teams except for a five-round 32-team KO in 1998. It appears that the field has been divided into two groups or four groups for round-robin play, with the top eight or top four advancing from each group to the knockout stage.

The next rendition will be at the "World Bridge Series Championships" meet in 2014. The Chinese Contract Bridge Association will host in Sanya, Hainan, from 10 to 25 October. The series name for the meet is new but WBF calls this the 14th World Bridge Series, or 14th Red Bull World Bridge Series. It will be the 6th competition for the McConnell Cup, and the 6th world championship for women teams in the series.

== Results ==
Year, Venue, Entries		Medalists
1994 Albuquerque, USA 16 teams	1.	(United States) Letizia; Jill Blanchard, Marinesa Letizia, Sue Picus, Rozanne Pollack, Judi Radin (USA)
1994 Albuquerque, USA 16 teams	2.	(United States) Woolsey; Karen Allison, JoAnne Casen, Dori Cohen, Joann Glasson, JoAnn Manfield, Sally Woolsey (USA)
1994 Albuquerque, USA 16 teams	3.	(United States) Alder — Mildred Breed, Tobi Deutsch, Amalya Kearse, Joyce Lilie, Jacqui Mitchell, Jo Morse (USA)
1994 Albuquerque, USA 16 teams	3.	(United States) Tornay — Judi Cody, Shelley Lapkoff, Linda Perlman, JoAnna Stansby, Carlyn Steiner, Claire Tornay (USA)
1998 Lille, France 56	1.	Erhart; Maria Erhart, Doris Fischer, Sylvia Terraneo, Terry Weigkricht (Austria)
1998 Lille, France 56	2.	Auken; Daniela von Arnim, Sabine Auken, Katrin Farwig, Barbara Stawowy (Germany)
1998 Lille, France 56	3.	(United States) Truscott — Jill Meyers, Shawn Quinn, Carol Sanders, Tobi Sokolow, JoAnn Sprung, Dorothy Truscott (USA)
1998 Lille, France 56	3.	(United States) Wood — Mickie Kivel, Ellee Lewis, Terry Michaels, Claire Tornay, Nadine Wood (USA)
2002 Montreal, Canada 36	1.	(United States) Sanborn; Lynn Deas, Irina Levitina, Jill Meyers, Randi Montin, Beth Palmer, Kerri Sanborn (USA)
2002 Montreal, Canada 36	2.	(United States) Radin; Mildred Breed, Rozanne Pollack, Shawn Quinn, Judi Radin, Valerie Westheimer, (Hjördis Eythorsdottir) (Note: The WBF stripped Hjördís Eyþórsdóttir of her silver medal for refusing to take a drug test.) (USA)
2002 Montreal, Canada 36	3.	Bessis; Véronique Bessis, Bénédicte Cronier, Catherine D'Ovidio, Sylvie Willard (France)
2006 Verona, Italy 39	1.	(Russia) (United States) Steiner; Victoria Gromova (RUS), Marinesa Letizia (USA), Tatiana Ponomareva (RUS), Janice Seamon-Molson (USA), Tobi Sokolow (USA), Carlyn Steiner (USA)
2006 Verona, Italy 39	2.	(United States) Narasimhan; Jill Levin, Irina Levitina, Jill Meyers, Hansa Narasimhan, Debbie Rosenberg, JoAnna Stansby (USA)
2006 Verona, Italy 39	3.	Katt-Bridge; Kathrine Bertheau, Catarina Midskog, Jenny Wolpert, Mari Ryman (Sweden)
2010 Philadelphia, USA 31 teams	1.	China Ladies; Xuefeng FENG, Ling GU, Yan LU, Ming SUN, Yanhui SUN, Hongli WANG (China)
2010 Philadelphia, USA 31 teams	2.	Netherlands; Carla Arnolds, Jet Pasman, Anneke Simons, Martine Verbeek, Bep Vriend, Wietske van Zwol (Netherlands)
2010 Philadelphia, USA 31 teams	3.	(France) (United States) (Russia) Fireman; Daniele Allouche-Gaviard (FRA), Shannon Cappelletti (USA), Catherine D'Ovidio (FRA), Phyllis Fireman (USA), Victoria Gromova (RUS), Tatiana Ponomareva (RUS)
2014 Sanya, China 26 teams	1.	(United States) (England) (Netherlands) Baker; Lynn Baker (USA), Karen McCallum (USA), Sally Brock (ENG), Nicola Smith (ENG), Marion Michielsen (NED), Meike Wortel (NED)
2014 Sanya, China 26 teams	2.	China Red; Lu Yan, Ran Jing Rong, Wang Hongli, Wang Wenfei, Wu Shaoyong, Zhang Yu (China)
2014 Sanya, China 26 teams	3.	(United States) Moss — Sylvia Moss (captain), Lynn Deas, Hjördis Eythorsdottir, Joann Glasson, Kerri Sanborn, Janice Seamon-Molson (USA)
2014 Sanya, China 26 teams	3.	Pertamina Ep — Rury Andhani, Lusje Oha Bojoh, Suci Amita Dewi, Kristina Wahyu Murniati, Conny Sumampouw, Julita Grace Tueje (Indonesia)
