= World Team Olympiad =

Contract bridge meet

The World Team Olympiad was a contract bridge meet organized by the World Bridge Federation every four years from 1960 to 2004. Its main events were world championships for national teams, always including one open and one restricted to women ("Open" and "Women" categories in WBF terms). A parallel event for seniors was inaugurated in 2000.

Although the Olympiad has been discontinued, its main constituent championships continue within or beside the World Mind Sports Games, first held October 2008 in Beijing, China, and the subsequent results are listed here. In 2016, the events were run separately, as the World Bridge Games, in Wrocław, Poland.

The 1960 "Olympiad" was the first meet organized by the WBF, although the organization has adopted one older event that now confers the title World Champion, the Bermuda Bowl competition.

The Olympiad championships differed from other world-level championships for "national" teams primarily by inviting every WBF member country to enter a team in each tournament. Other world championships, including the older Bermuda Bowl for open teams that is now contested every odd-number year, require qualification at a "zone" level. For example, about 40 national open teams from European Bridge League member countries may compete biennially for eight entries in the Bermuda Bowl tournament.

Over the twelve World Team Olympiad cycles, the fields grew from 29 open and 14 women teams in 1960 to 72 open, 43 women, and 29 seniors teams in 2004. For the first World Mind Sports Games there were 71 open and 54 women entries; the Seniors International Cup continued as a non-medal event with 32 entries. Seniors participation increased to 34 at the second WMSG in 2012 while the numbers of open and women entries dropped to 60 and 43.

== Open Teams ==
Teams representing Italy and France won five and four of the twelve Open Team Olympiad tournaments. The Italian Blue Team won three in a row 1964 to 1972, overlapping its run of ten Bermuda Bowls (1957–1969). Another Italian team won the last two Olympiads and made it three in a row in the first rendition as part of the World Mind Sports Games, 2000 to 2008, overlapping its run of seven European championships (1995–2006).

Year, Host, Entries		Medalists
1960 Turin, Italy 29 teams	1.	France; René Bacherich, Gérard Bourchtoff, Claude Delmouly, Pierre Ghestem, Pierre Jaïs, Roger Trézel
1960 Turin, Italy 29 teams	2.	(United Kingdom) Great Britain; Jeremy Flint, Nico Gardener, Terence Reese, Albert Rose, Boris Schapiro, Ralph Swimer
1960 Turin, Italy 29 teams	3.	(United States) USA Vanderbilt 1 B. Jay Becker, John Crawford, Norman Kay, George Rapée, Sidney Silodor, Tobias Stone
1964 New York City, USA 29	1.	Italy; Walter Avarelli, Giorgio Belladonna, Massimo D'Alelio, Pietro Forquet, Benito Garozzo, Camillo Pabis Ticci
1964 New York City, USA 29	2.	(United States) USA; Bob Hamman, Robert F. Jordan, Don Krauss, Victor Mitchell, Arthur Robinson, Sam Stayman
1964 New York City, USA 29	3.	(United Kingdom) Great Britain; Jeremy Flint, Maurice Harrison-Gray, Kenneth Konstam, Terence Reese, Boris Schapiro, Joel Tarlo
1968 Deauville, France 33	1.	Italy; Walter Avarelli, Giorgio Belladonna, Massimo D'Alelio, Pietro Forquet, Benito Garozzo, Camillo Pabis Ticci
1968 Deauville, France 33	2.	(United States) USA; Robert F. Jordan, Edgar Kaplan, Norman Kay, Arthur Robinson, Bill Root, Al Roth
1968 Deauville, France 33	3.	Canada; Gerry Charney, Bill Crissey, C. Bruce Elliott, Sami Kehela, Eric Murray, Percy Sheardown
1972 Miami Beach, USA 39	1.	Italy; Walter Avarelli, Giorgio Belladonna, Massimo D'Alelio, Pietro Forquet, Benito Garozzo, Camillo Pabis Ticci
1972 Miami Beach, USA 39	2.	(United States) USA; Bobby Goldman, Bob Hamman, Jim Jacoby, Mike Lawrence, Paul Soloway, Bobby Wolff
1972 Miami Beach, USA 39	3.	Canada; Gerry Charney, Bill Crissey, Bruce Gowdy, Sami Kehela, Eric Murray, Duncan Phillips
1976 Monte Carlo, Monaco 45	1.	Brazil; Pedro Paulo Assumpção, Sérgio Barbosa, Marcelo Branco, Gabriel Chagas, Gabino Cintra, Christiano Fonseca
1976 Monte Carlo, Monaco 45	2.	Italy; Giorgio Belladonna, Pietro Forquet, Arturo Franco, Benito Garozzo, Carlo Mosca, Silvio Sbarigia
1976 Monte Carlo, Monaco 45	3.	(United Kingdom) Great Britain; Willie Coyle, Jeremy Flint, Tony Priday, Claude Rodrigue, Irving Rose, Robert Sheehan
1980 Valkenburg, Netherlands 58 teams	1.	France; Paul Chemla, Michel Lebel, Christian Mari, Michel Perron, (Philippe Soulet, Henri Szwarc)*
1980 Valkenburg, Netherlands 58 teams	2.	(United States) USA; Fred Hamilton, Bob Hamman, Mike Passell, Ira Rubin, Paul Soloway, Bobby Wolff
1980 Valkenburg, Netherlands 58 teams	3.	Netherlands — Hans Kreijns, Anton Maas, André Mulder, Carol van Oppen, Hans Vergoed, René Zwaan
1980 Valkenburg, Netherlands 58 teams	3.	Norway — Jon Aabye, Per Breck, Tor Helness, Reidar Lien, Harald Nordby, Leif-Erik Stabell
After 1980 it was determined that the Pairs and Teams Olympiads in alternating even years would continue to be played in Europe and North America.
1984 Seattle, USA 54	1.	Poland; Piotr Gawryś, Krzysztof Martens, Tomasz Przybora, Jacek Romański, Piotr Tuszyński, Henryk Wolny
1984 Seattle, USA 54	2.	France; Paul Chemla, Félix Covo, Hervé Mouiel, Fivo Paladino, Michel Perron, Henri Szwarc
1984 Seattle, USA 54	3.	Denmark; Jens Auken, Knud-Aage Boesgaard, Johannes Hulgaard, Peter Schaltz, Steen Schou, Stig Werdelin
1988 Venice, Italy 56	1.	(United States) USA; Seymon Deutsch, Bob Hamman, Jim Jacoby, Jeff Meckstroth, Eric Rodwell, Bobby Wolff
1988 Venice, Italy 56	2.	Austria; Heinrich Berger, Jan Fucik, Alfred Kadlec, Fritz Kubak, Wolfgang Meinl, Franz Terraneo
1988 Venice, Italy 56	3.	Sweden; Björn Fallenius, Sven-Olov Flodqvist, Hans Göthe, Tommy Gullberg, Magnus Lindkvist, Per Olof Sundelin
1992 Salsomaggiore, Italy 57	1.	France; Paul Chemla, Alain Lévy, Hervé Mouiel, Michel Perron, (Pierre Adad, Maurice Aujaleu)*
1992 Salsomaggiore, Italy 57	2.	(United States) USA; Seymon Deutsch, Bob Hamman, Jeff Meckstroth, Eric Rodwell, Michael Rosenberg, Bobby Wolff
1992 Salsomaggiore, Italy 57	3.	Netherlands; Wubbo de Boer, Enri Leufkens, Bauke Muller, Berry Westra, (Jaap van der Neut, Marcel Nooijen)**
1996 Rhodes, Greece 71	1.	France; Marc Bompis, Alain Lévy, Christian Mari, Hervé Mouiel, Franck Multon, Henri Szwarc
1996 Rhodes, Greece 71	2.	Indonesia; Franky Karwur, Henky Lasut, Eddy Manoppo, Denny Sacul, (Santje Panelewen, Giovanni Watulingas)***
1996 Rhodes, Greece 71	3.	Denmark; Morten Andersen, Jens Auken, Lars Blakset, Søren Christiansen, Dennis Koch-Palmund, Lauge Schäffer
2000 Maastricht, Netherlands 72 teams	1.	Italy; Norberto Bocchi, Giorgio Duboin, Lorenzo Lauria, Alfredo Versace, (Dano De Falco, Guido Ferraro)*
2000 Maastricht, Netherlands 72 teams	2.	Poland; Cezary Balicki, Krzysztof Jassem, Michał Kwiecień, Jacek Pszczoła, Piotr Tuszyński, Adam Żmudziński
2000 Maastricht, Netherlands 72 teams	3.	(United States) USA; David Berkowitz, Larry N. Cohen, Steve Garner, George Jacobs, Ralph Katz, Howard Weinstein
2004 Istanbul, Turkey 72	1.	Italy; Norberto Bocchi, Giorgio Duboin, Fulvio Fantoni, Lorenzo Lauria, Claudio Nunes, Alfredo Versace
2004 Istanbul, Turkey 72	2.	Netherlands; Sjoert Brink, Bas Drijver, Jan Jansma, Ricco van Prooijen, Maarten Schollaardt, Louk Verhees
2004 Istanbul, Turkey 72	3.	Russia; Alexander Dubinin, Andrey Gromov, Jouri Khokhlov, Max Khven, Georgi Matushko, Vladimir Rekunov
After 2004 the Olympiad meet was discontinued by the World Bridge Federation in favor of participation in the World Mind Sports Games. This knockout tournament for Open national teams continues in the new context, with the same quadrennial cycle and conditions.
2008 Beijing, China 71 teams	1.	Italy; Giorgio Duboin, Fulvio Fantoni, Lorenzo Lauria, Claudio Nunes, Antonio Sementa, Alfredo Versace
2008 Beijing, China 71 teams	2.	England; David Gold, Jason Hackett, Justin Hackett, Artur Malinowski, Nicklas Sandqvist, Tom Townsend
2008 Beijing, China 71 teams	3.	Norway; Terje Aa, Glenn Grøtheim, Geir Helgemo, Tor Helness, Jørgen Molberg, Ulf Håkon Tundal
2012 Lille, France 60 teams	1.	Sweden; Krister Ahlesved, Peter Bertheau, Per-Ola Cullin, Fredrik Nyström, Jonas Petersson, Johan Upmark
2012 Lille, France 60 teams	2.	Poland; Cezary Balicki, Krzysztof Buras, Grzegorz Narkiewicz, Piotr Żak, Jerzy Zaremba, Adam Żmudziński
2012 Lille, France 60 teams	3.	Monaco; Fulvio Fantoni, Geir Helgemo, Tor Helness, Franck Multon, Claudio Nunes, Pierre Zimmermann

* Soulet–Szwarc in 1980, Adad–Aujaleu in 1992, and De Falco–Ferraro in 2000 did not play enough boards to qualify for the title of World Champion
** Van der Neut and Nooijen in 1992 did not play enough boards to qualify for third place
*** Panelewen and Watulingas in 1996 did not play enough boards to qualify for second place

== Women's Teams ==
Teams representing eight countries won the Olympiad series for Women during its twelve renditions, led by the United States with four. England won the first rendition as part of the World Mind Sports Games, beating host China by one IMP in 2008.

Year, Host, Entries		Medalists
1960 Turin, Italy 14 teams	1.	(United Arab Republic) UAR; Helen Camara, Aida Choucry, Samika Fathy, Loula Gordon, Josephine Morcos, Suzanne Naguib
1960 Turin, Italy 14 teams	2.	(France) France; Nadine Alexandre, Annie Chanfray, — Gary, Geneviève Morénas, Esmerian Pouldjian, — Rouvière
1960 Turin, Italy 14 teams	3.	(Denmark) Denmark; Otti Damm, Annelise Faber, Rigmor Fraenckel, Lizzie Schaltz, Gulle Skotte
1964 New York City, USA 15	1.	(United Kingdom) Great Britain; Dimmie Fleming, Fritzi Gordon, Jane Juan, Rixi Markus, Mary Moss, Dorothy Shanahan
1964 New York City, USA 15	2.	(United States) USA; Agnes Gordon, Muriel Kaplan, Alicia Kempner, Helen Portugal, Stella Rebner, Jan Stone
1964 New York City, USA 15	3.	(France) France; Suzanne Baldon, Annie Chanfray, Marguerite de Gailhard, Geneviève Morénas, Marianne Serf
1968 Deauville, France 19	1.	(Sweden) Sweden; Britt Blom, Karin Eriksson, Eva Mårtensson, Rut Segander, Gunborg Silborn, Britta Werner
1968 Deauville, France 19	2.	(South Africa) South Africa; Thelma Beron, Gerda Goslar, Rita Jacobson, Petra Mansell, Elfreda Sender, Alma Shnieder
1968 Deauville, France 19	3.	(United States) USA; Hermine Baron, Nancy Gruver, Emma Jean Hawes, Dorothy Hayden, Sue Sachs, Rhoda Walsh
1972 Miami Beach, USA 18	1.	(Italy) Italy; Marisa Bianchi, Luciana Canessa, Rina Jabès, Maria Antonietta Robaudo, Anna Valenti, Maria Vittoria Venturini
1972 Miami Beach, USA 18	2.	(South Africa) South Africa; Thelma Beron, Janie Disler, Gerda Goslar, Rita Jacobson, Petra Mansell, Alma Shnieder
1972 Miami Beach, USA 18	3.	(United States) USA; Mary Jane Farell, Emma Jean Hawes, Marilyn Johnson, Jacqui Mitchell, Peggy Solomon, Dorothy Hayden Truscott
1976 Monte Carlo, Monaco 21	1.	(Italy) Italy; Marisa Bianchi, Luciana Capodanno, Marisa D'Andrea, Rina Jabès, Maria Antonietta Robaudo, Anna Valenti
1976 Monte Carlo, Monaco 21	2.	(United Kingdom) Great Britain; Charley Esterson, Nicola Gardener, Fritzi Gordon, Sandra Landy, Rixi Markus, Rita Oldroyd
1976 Monte Carlo, Monaco 21	3.	(United States) USA; Mary Jane Farell, Emma Jean Hawes, Marilyn Johnson, Jacqui Mitchell, Gail Moss, Dorothy Hayden Truscott
1980 Valkenburg, Netherlands 29 teams	1.	(United States) USA; Mary Jane Farell, Emma Jean Hawes, Marilyn Johnson, Jacqui Mitchell, Gail Moss, Dorothy Hayden Truscott
1980 Valkenburg, Netherlands 29 teams	2.	(Italy) Italy; Marisa Bianchi, Luciana Capodanno, Marisa D'Andrea, Enrichetta Gut, Andreina Morini, Anna Valenti
1980 Valkenburg, Netherlands 29 teams	3.	(United Kingdom) Great Britain; Nicola Gardener, Sandra Landy, Rita Oldroyd, Sally Sowter, (Michelle Brunner, Pat Davies)*
After 1980 it was determined that the Pairs and Teams Olympiads in alternating even years would continue to be played in Europe and North America.
1984 Seattle, USA 23	1.	(United States) USA; Betty Ann Kennedy, Jacqui Mitchell, Gail Moss, Judi Radin, Carol Sanders, Kathie Wei
1984 Seattle, USA 23	2.	(United Kingdom) Great Britain; Pat Davies, Sally Horton, Sandra Landy, Nicola Smith, (Sarah Scarborough, Gillian Scott-Jones)**
1984 Seattle, USA 23	3.	(Netherlands) Netherlands; Marijke Erich, Petra Kaas, Laura Lor, Marijke van der Pas, Elly Schippers, Bep Vriend
1988 Venice, Italy 37	1.	(Denmark) Denmark; Trine Dahl, Bettina Kalkerup, Judy Norris, Charlotte Palmund, Dorthe Schaltz, Kirsten Steen Møller
1988 Venice, Italy 37	2.	(United Kingdom) Great Britain; Michelle Brunner, Pat Davies, Sandra Landy, Liz McGowan, Sandra Penfold, Nicola Smith
1988 Venice, Italy 37	3.	(Bulgaria) Bulgaria; Nevena Deleva, Maria Garvalova, Albena Krasteva, Matilda Poplilov, (Margarita Halatcheva, Steliana Ivanova)*
1992 Salsomaggiore, Italy 34	1.	(Austria) Austria; Maria Erhart, Doris Fischer, Barbara Lindinger, Terry Weigkricht, (Herta Gyimesi, Jovanka Smederevac)***
1992 Salsomaggiore, Italy 34	2.	(United Kingdom) Great Britain; Pat Davies, Michele Handley, Sandra Landy, Liz McGowan, Sandra Penfold, Nicola Smith
1992 Salsomaggiore, Italy 34	3.	(France) France; Danièle Avon, Véronique Bessis, Anne-Claude de l'Epine, Élisabeth Delor, Colette Lise, Sylvie Willard
1996 Rhodes, Greece 43	1.	(United States) USA; Jill Blanchard, Juanita Chambers, Lynn Deas, Gail Greenberg, Irina Levitina, Shawn Quinn
1996 Rhodes, Greece 43	2.	(China) China; GU Ling, SUN Ming, WANG Hongli, WANG Wenfei, ZHANG Yalan, ZHANG Yu
1996 Rhodes, Greece 43	3.	(Canada) Canada; Francine Cimon, Dianna Gordon, Rhoda Habert, Beverly Kraft, Sharyn Reus, Barbara Saltsman
2000 Maastricht, Netherlands 41 teams	1.	(United States) USA; Mildred Breed, Petra Hamman, Joan Jackson, Robin Klar, Shawn Quinn, Peggy Sutherlin
2000 Maastricht, Netherlands 41 teams	2.	(Canada) Canada; Francine Cimon, Dianna Gordon, Rhoda Habert, Beverly Kraft, Martine Lacroix, Katie Thorpe
2000 Maastricht, Netherlands 41 teams	3.	(Germany) Germany; Daniela von Arnim, Sabine Auken, Katrin Farwig, Pony Nehmert, Andrea Rauscheid, Barbara Stawowy
2004 Istanbul, Turkey 43	1.	(Russia) Russia; Olga Galaktionova, Victoria Gromova, Natalia Karpenko, Maria Lebedeva, Tatiana Ponomareva, Irina Vasilkova
2004 Istanbul, Turkey 43	2.	(United States) USA; Marinesa Letizia, Jill Meyers, Randi Montin, Janice Seamon-Molson, Tobi Sokolow, Carlyn Steiner
2004 Istanbul, Turkey 43	3.	(England) England; Sally Brock, Michelle Brunner, Heather Dhondy, Rhona Goldenfield, Nicola Smith, Kitty Teltscher
After 2004 the Olympiad meet was discontinued by the World Bridge Federation in favor of participation in the World Mind Sports Games. This knockout tournament for Women national teams continues in the new context, with the same quadrennial cycle and conditions.
2008 Beijing, China 54 teams	1.	England; Sally Brock, Heather Dhondy, Catherine Draper, Anne Rosen, Nevena Senior, Nicola Smith
2008 Beijing, China 54 teams	2.	China; Ling Gu, Yi Qian Liu, Ming Sun, Hongli Wang, Wenfei Wang, Yalan Zhang
2008 Beijing, China 54 teams	3.	(United States) USA; Mildred Breed, Marinesa Letizia, Sylvia Moss, Judi Radin, Janice Seamon-Molson, Tobi Sokolow
2012 Lille, France 43 teams	1.	England; Sally Brock, Fiona Brown, Heather Dhondy, Nevena Senior, Nicola Smith, Susan Stockdale
2012 Lille, France 43 teams	2.	Russia; Svetlana Chubarova, Victoria Gromova, Anna Gulevich, Elena Khonicheva, Tatiana Ponomareva, Olga Vorobeychikova
2012 Lille, France 43 teams	3.	Poland; Cathy Bałdysz, Ewa Banaszkiewicz, Katarzyna Dufrat, Danuta Kazmucha, Natalia Sakowska, Justyna Żmuda

* Brunner–Davies in 1980 and Halatcheva–Ivanova in 1988 did not play enough boards in order to qualify for third place
** Scarborough and Scott-Jones in 1984 did not play enough boards in order to qualify for second place
*** Gyimesi and Smederevac in 1992 did not play enough boards in order to qualify for the title of World Champion

== Senior International Cup ==
Teams representing the United States won both renditions of the Senior International Cup. From 2008 the World Bridge Federation continues the tournament in conjunction with the World Mind Sports Games although it is not a WMSG event.

Currently "a bridge a player belongs to the 'Seniors' category if he has at least his 60th birthday in the calendar year in question." For the next rendition (2012) players born in 1952 or earlier will be eligible. (The threshold increased one year annually from 2005 to 2010.)

Year, Host, Entries		Medalists
2000 Maastricht, Netherlands 24 teams born 1944 or earlier	1.	(United States) USA; John Mohan, Dan Morse, Steve Robinson, John Sutherlin, Bobby Wolff, Kit Woolsey
2000 Maastricht, Netherlands 24 teams born 1944 or earlier	2.	France; Pierre Adad, Maurice Aujaleu, Claude Delmouly, François Leenhardt, Christian Mari, Jean-Marc Roudinesco
2000 Maastricht, Netherlands 24 teams born 1944 or earlier	3.	Sweden; Lars Alfredsson, Lars Backström, Sture Ekberg, Hans Göthe, Hans-Olof Hallén, Anders Morath
2004 Istanbul, Turkey 29 teams born 1949 or earlier	1.	(United States) USA; Leo Bell, Neil Chambers, Marshall Miles, John Onstott, Jim Robison, John Schermer
2004 Istanbul, Turkey 29 teams born 1949 or earlier	2.	Netherlands; Willem Boegem, Nico Doremans, Onno Janssens, Jaap Trouwborst
2004 Istanbul, Turkey 29 teams born 1949 or earlier	3.	Germany; Hans Humburg, Reiner Marsal, Göran Mattsson, Werner Schneider, Dirk Schroeder, Horst-Dieter Uhlmann
After 2004 the Olympiad meet was discontinued by the World Bridge Federation in favor of participation in the World Mind Sports Games. This knockout tournament for Seniors national teams continues alongside the Games as a non-medal event.
2008 Beijing, China; World Mind Sports Games non-medal event 32 teams born 1950 or earlier	1.	Japan; Hiroya Abe, Makoto Hirata, Masayuki Ino, Yoshiyuki Nakamura, Kyoko Ohno
2008 Beijing, China; World Mind Sports Games non-medal event 32 teams born 1950 or earlier	2.	(United States) USA; Grant Baze, Billy Eisenberg, Russ Ekeblad, Matt Granovetter, Sam Lev, Reese Milner
2008 Beijing, China; World Mind Sports Games non-medal event 32 teams born 1950 or earlier	3.	Indonesia; Michael Bambang Hartono, Henky Lasut, Eddy Manoppo, Denny Sacul, Munawar Sawiruddin, Ferdinand Robert Waluyan
2012 Lille, France; World Mind Sports Games non-medal event 34 teams born 1952 or earlier	1.	Hungary; Dumbovich Miklós, Kovács Mihály, Magyar Péter, Szappanos Géza, (Barany György)* (family names first)
2012 Lille, France; World Mind Sports Games non-medal event 34 teams born 1952 or earlier	2.	United States; Neil Chambers, Lew Finkel, Stephen Landen, Sam Lev, John Schermer, Richard Schwartz
2012 Lille, France; World Mind Sports Games non-medal event 34 teams born 1952 or earlier	3.	France; Patrick Grenthe, Guy Lasserre, François Leenhardt, Patrice Piganeau, Philippe Poizat, Philippe Vanhoutte

*Hungary captain Barany played the last segment of the first knockout match but the team otherwise used four players. In their preliminary group of 17 teams Dumbovich–Kovács and Magyar–Szappanos were two of only three pairs who played all 16 matches of the six-day round-robin (256 deals).

== World Mind Sports Games ==
After the 2004 Olympiad, the WBF and the world governing bodies for three other games—chess, draughts, and go—established the International Mind Sports Association and initiated its first priority, the quadrennial World Mind Sports Games (WMSG). The first WMSG were held in Beijing October 2008, about two months after the summer Olympic Games.

Thus a WBF initiative to integrate bridge with the Olympics was abandoned in favor of a long-term goal, advancing the WMSG as a "stepping stone on the path of introducing a third kind of Olympic Games (after the Summer and the Winter Olympics)". The multi-event "World Team Olympiad" was discontinued in favor of participation in the WMSG but the constituent events of the Olympiad continue—Teams championships in Open and Women categories as part of the WMSG; in Seniors and Transnational categories as non-medal side events. (Note: Bridge at the WMSG officially comprised, among other events, the two "series which used to be part of the Olympiad (Open and Women national teams). ... The Seniors competition for national teams, held along the lines of the Olympiad Open and Women series, and the World Transnational Mixed Teams championship were also held in Beijing, although, officially, they were not part of the World Bridge Games"; that is, not WMSG medal events. World Bridge Games makes an impressive debut, 1st World Mind Sports Games contemporary coverage, 2008, World Bridge Federation. Page 1.)

== See also ==
- Bermuda Bowl
- Venice Cup
- Senior Bowl
- Bridge at the 2008 World Mind Sports Games
- Bridge at the 2012 World Mind Sports Games
- World Bridge Games
