= Cecilia Rimstedt =

Swedish bridge player

Cecilia Dwyer Rimstedt
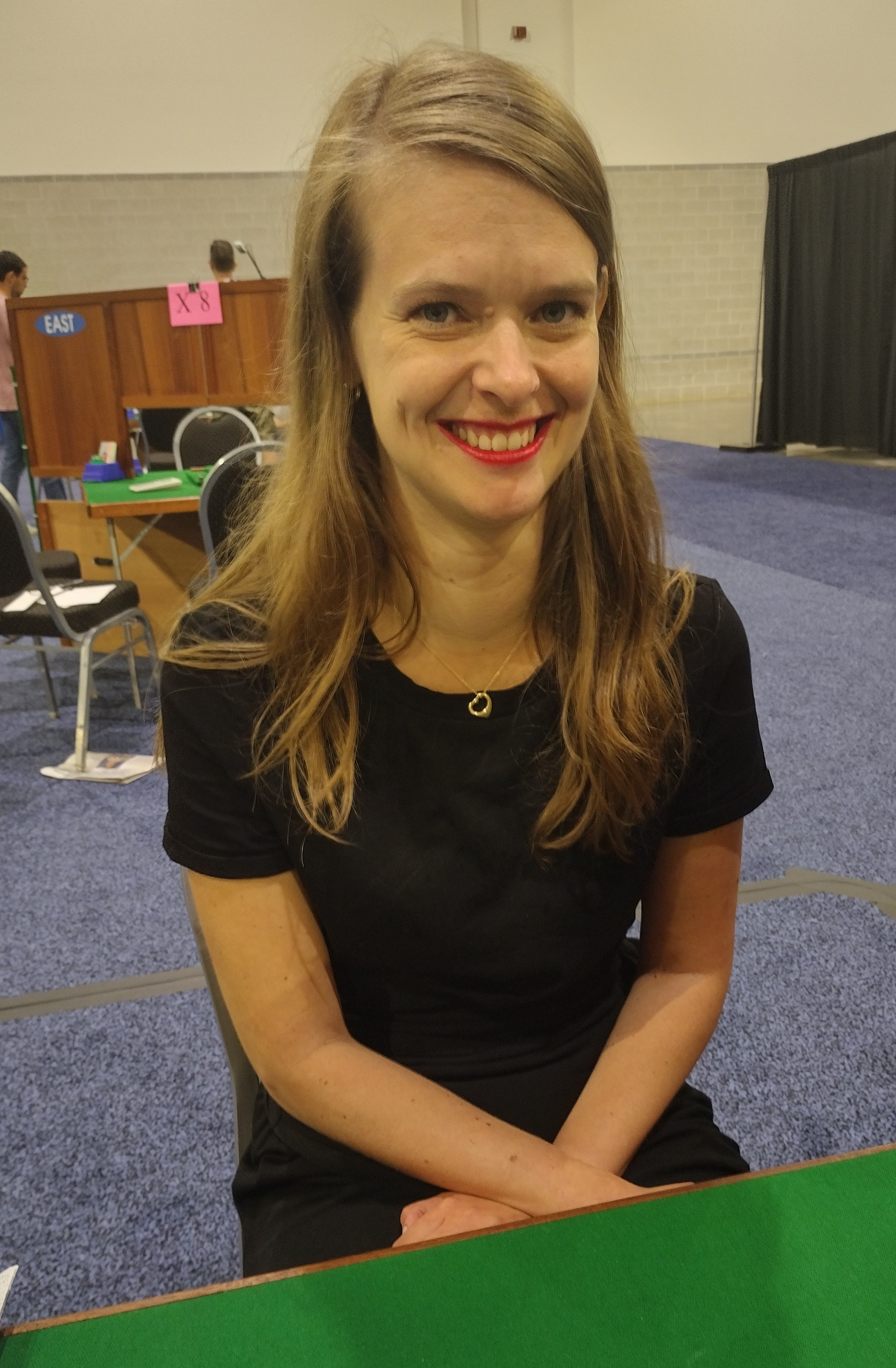

Cecilia Dwyer Rimstedt (1988) is a Swedish two-time world champion bridge player. Rimstedt comes from a Bridge playing family including her sister, Sandra Rimstedt and twin brothers Mikael Rimstedt and Ola Rimstedt.

== Bridge accomplishments ==
=== Wins ===
- Venice Cup (1) 2019
- World Bridge Series Women Teams (1) 2022
- North American Bridge Championships (1)
  - Smith Life Master Women's Pairs 2006

=== Runners-up ===
- Venice Cup (1) 2017
