= Sandra Rimstedt =

Swedish bridge player

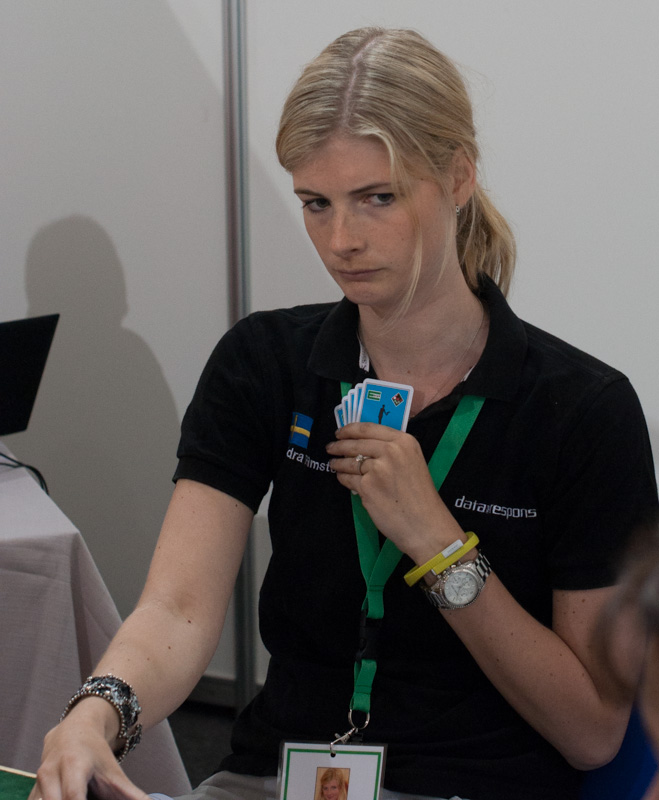

Sandra Rimstedt is a Swedish European and World champion bridge player. Rimstedt comes from a Bridge playing family including her sister, Cecilia Rimstedt and twin brothers Mikael Rimstedt and Ola Rimstedt.

== Bridge accomplishments ==
=== Wins ===
- World Bridge Series Women Teams (1) 2022
- European Women Pairs (1) 2015

=== Runners-up ===
- Venice Cup (1) 2017
- Youth European Championship (2) 2004, 2005
- Machlin Women's Swiss Teams (1) 2017
