= Matilda Poplilov =

Bulgarian–Israeli contract bridge player

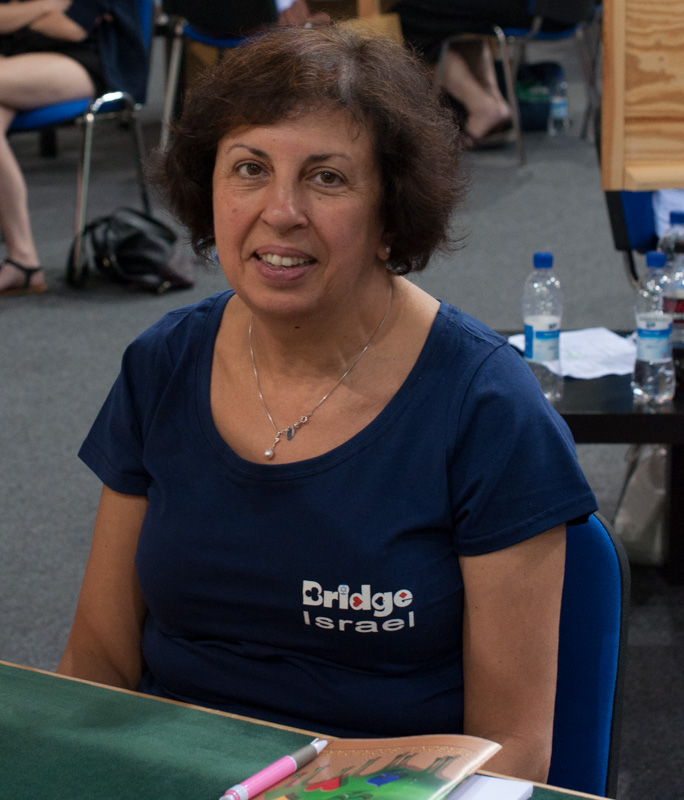
- Matilda Poplilov in 2014
- Born: March 2, 1954 (age 72); Sofia, Bulgaria
- Occupation: Contract bridge player
- Known for: World International Master (World Bridge Federation (WBF); European Master (European Bridge League (EBL)

Matilda Poplilov (Bulgarian: Матилда Поплилов; born 2 March 1954 in Sofia, Bulgaria) is a Bulgarian–Israeli contract bridge player. She is a World International Master (awarded by the World Bridge Federation) and a European Master (awarded by the European Bridge League). Poplilov has represented both Bulgaria and Israel at European and world championships, earning gold, silver and bronze medals at the European level and a bronze medal at the World Bridge Olympiad.

== Biography ==
Popliloc is a graduate of the Technical University of Sofia in 1976. From 1976 to 1990, Poplilov worked at the Institute of Microelectronics in Sofia, and from 1990 until her retirement 2015, she was employed at the Israel Electric Corporation (Hevrat Hashmal) as a lead programmer.

Since 2003, Poplilov has been the editor of the Israel Bridge Federation's (IBF) magazine BRIDGE.

== Bridge career ==
Poplilov is a multiple winner of numerous national and international contract bridge titles – pairs, mixed pairs, women's teams, and mixed teams.

=== Major achievements ===
- 1987 – European champion in women's pairs in Brighton (with Nevena Deleva – later Nevena Senior) – the first European champion in this format.
- 1988 – bronze medal at the World Team Olympiad in Venice (women's team of Bulgaria: Matilda Poplilov, Nevena Deleva, Maria Garvalova, Albena Krasteva, Margarita Halatcheva, Steliana Ivanova).
- 1989 – bronze medal at the European Bridge Championships in Turku (women's pairs, with Nevena Deleva).
- 1990 – Open pairs champion of Israel (with Lilo Poplilov) – the first woman to win this title in Israel.
- 1997 – bronze medal at the European Bridge Championships in Montecatini (women's team of Israel: Matilda Poplilov, Daniela Birman, Anda Enciu-Barber, Migry Albu, Ruth Levit-Porat, Ilana Barnes).
- 2000 – member of the open national team of Israel at the Bridge Olympiad in Maastricht – the first woman to be included in Israel's open team (Doron Yadlin, Israel Yadlin, Avi Kalish, Lilo Poplilov, Matilda Poplilov, Leonid Podgur).
- 2006 – champion of Israel in open teams (with Lilo Poplilov, Mordehay Gelbert, Zvi Engel, Ron Segev and Dana Tal) – the first women to win this title.
- 2007 – silver medal with the women's team of England (European Bridge Championships in Antalya, team Penfold: Heather Dhondy, Matilda Poplilov, Nevena Senior, Nicola Smith, Sandra Penfold).
- 2007 – European champion in mixed teams in Antalya, team Dhondy (Matilda Poplilov, Jeremy Dhondy, Heather Dhondy and Lilo Poplilov).
- 2014 – champion of Israel in women's pairs with Ilana Berner
- 2017 – third place in Israel women's pairs championship with Ilana Berner.

=== Other Team Events Positions ===
- 2016 – coach of the Bulgaria senior team at the – 53rd European Team Championships, Budapest 2016.
- 2019 – coach of the Bulgaria senior team at the World Bridge Championships – 44th World Bridge Teams Championships, Wuhan 2019.

Poplilov also holds many national titles, including in the mixed pairs, mixed teams, and women's pairs disciplines.
