= Brigitta Fischer =

Hungarian bridge player

Brigitta Fischer is a Hungarian World Champion bridge player. She won the Women's Team event in Wrocław in 2022.

She has represented Hungary in Junior events.

== Bridge accomplishments ==
=== Wins ===
- World Bridge Series Women Teams (1) 2022

=== Runners up ===
- European Women U26 Teams (1) 2019
