= Michelle Brunner =

British bridge player, teacher, and writer (1953–2011)

Michelle Brunner (31 December 1953 – 24 June 2011) was a British bridge player, writer and teacher. She was a member of the British team that won the 1985 Venice Cup, the biennial world championship for women national teams.

She also finished second once and third twice in the quadriennial World Team Olympiad, women flight. As of September 2011 she held historic rank 24 among European Grand Masters, Women category. (Female players commonly have rankings and may be grand masters in the open category too.)

== Death ==
Brunner was diagnosed with metastatic breast cancer in 2007 and died on 24 June 2011 at age 57.

== Early life ==
Born in London, Brunner attended the Henrietta Barnett School in Hampstead Garden Suburb, London, where she learned and practised her bridge playing skills during her sixth form years.

Following this, she went to Manchester University where she read Italian and French, but her increasing involvement in bridge meant that she left without getting her degree to work in the travel industry for Thomas Cook for seventeen years. At university, she met and played with John Holland, who would also become an international player. He soon became her partner in life as well as in bridge, and they married in 2008.

== Bridge career ==
Brunner was a World Bridge Federation Life Master and an English Bridge Union (EBU) Premier Grand Master.

Her Venice Cup win in 1985 was achieved as partner to Gill Scott-Jones on the Great Britain team. However the pair did not play enough boards to qualify for the title of World Champions. In 1980, she and Pat Davies were part of the Great Britain team that finished third in the World Team Olympiad, but the pair did not play enough boards to qualify for bronze medals.

In 1988, the Great Britain team finished second and Brunner, as partner to Sandra Landy, did earn the silver medal. In 2004, she was part of the England team in the Olympiad which finished third, and received a bronze medal partnering Rhona Goldenfield.

In mixed and women's events she won gold and bronze medals in the Common Market Championships and gold, silver and bronze in the European Championships. Partnering John Holland, she was part of three England teams which won the Camrose Trophy. Brunner was also in winning teams in the Lady Milne competition, the equivalent of the Camrose Trophy for women teams, on seven occasions.

She turned professional in 1995, when she launched her Mobile School of Bridge. Brunner taught beginning and intermediate players until 2006. She did private teaching, as well as offering her services as a professional partner. As well as writing articles for bridge magazines, she wrote two books. According to Tom Townsend, she was "one of Manchester's best-loved teachers and players".

== Publications ==
Books

- Brunner, Michelle (2000). Acol Bidding for Improvers. Bridge with Brunner. London: B. T. Batsford. ISBN 978-0-7134-8625-4. OCLC 45690140. 192 pp.
- Brunner, Michelle (2003). Acol Bidding for Budding Experts. Bridge with Brunner. Batsford. ISBN 978-0-7134-8799-2. LCCN 2003283585. OCLC 51108253. 192 pp.

Pamphlets

- Practise Your Avoidance Plays (Bisley: Bridge Plus, 2001) 16 pp. OCLC 60490540
