= WBG =

WBG may refer to:

- Warner Bros. Games, an American video game publishing company
- World Bank Group, a family of five international organizations that makes leveraged loans, generally to poor countries
- Wide bandgap, a term associated with semiconductors having electronic band gaps significantly larger than one electron volt
- Wissenschaftliche Buchgesellschaft, a German publishing company
- Women's Boat to Gaza, a 2016 initiative to break the Israeli blockade of the Gaza Strip
- World Bridge Games, a contract bridge competition event
- The Amtrak station code for the Williamsburg Transportation Center in Williamsburg, Virginia
- Schleswig Air Base, is an airbase of the German Air Force
