= Dorothy Hayden Truscott =

American bridge player (1925–2006)

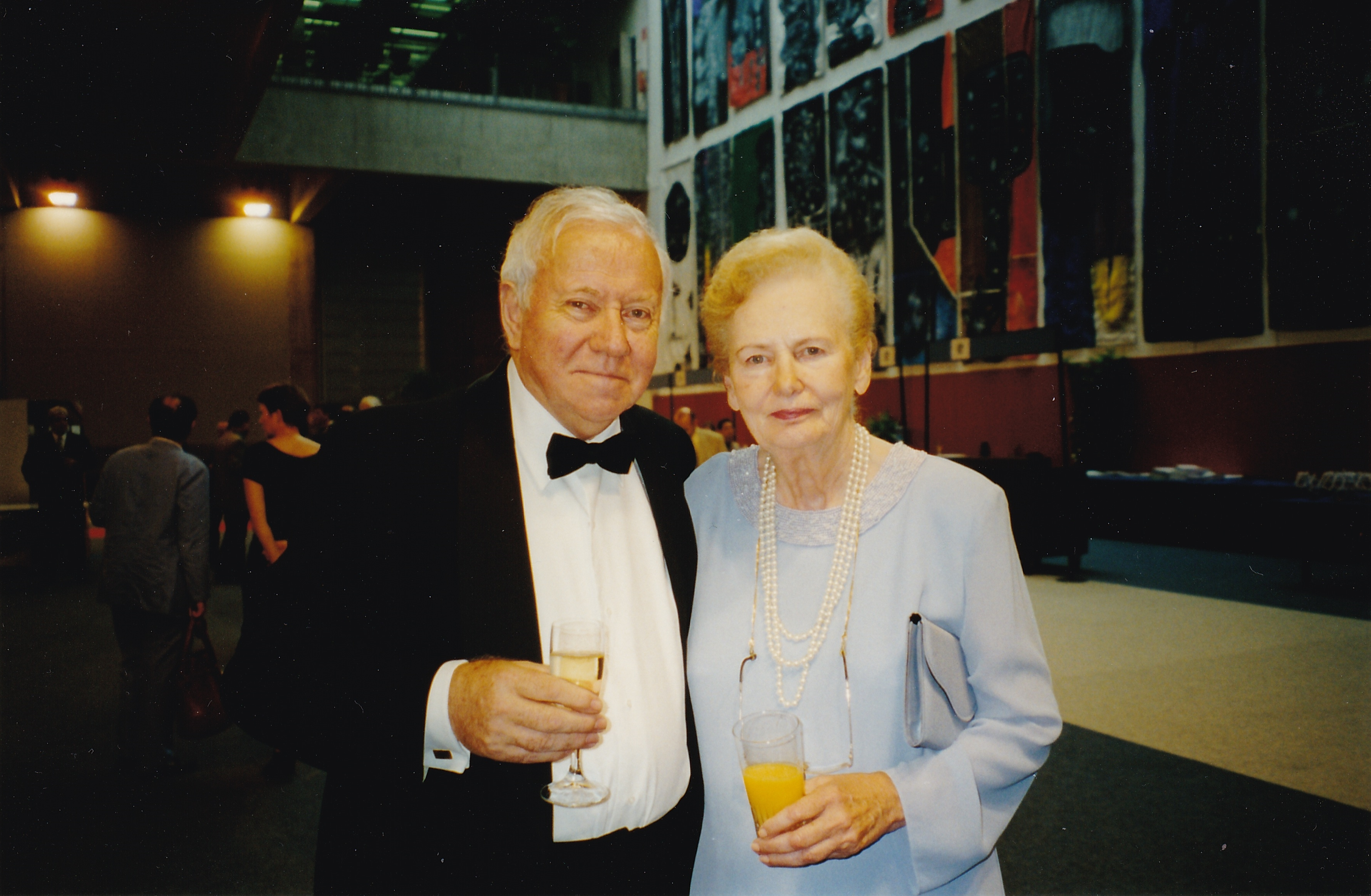
Alan and Dorothy Truscott

Dorothy Hayden Truscott (November 3, 1925 – July 4, 2006) was an American bridge player, winner of four world championships and the top-ranked woman for many years. In the late 1960s, she authored two books on the game and later co-authored two with her husband Alan Truscott. Her 1966 book, Bid Better, Play Better is considered a classic and was progressively updated.

== Early and later life ==
Truscott was born as Dorothy Johnson in New York City. Her parents, Dorothy and Reginald Johnson, were keen bridge players and taught their daughter the game when she was 7 years old. Truscott would normally watch her mother play the game, but her father would allow her to bid and play his hand when he poured drinks. One evening a player was late, and she was allowed to fill in. That introduction made her a "bridge addict" for the remainder of her life.

She graduated from Smith College and briefly taught mathematics in Kalamazoo, Michigan. Her first two marriages ended in divorce. Her third, in 1972, was to Alan Truscott, bridge journalist for The New York Times.

Truscott died in New Russia, New York, of complications from Parkinson's disease.

== Bridge career ==
She won her first "national championships" in 1959 as Dorothy Hayden, the Mixed Pairs with John Crawford and the Women Pairs with Betty Goldberg. She won four world titles as a player: the Venice Cup in 1974, 1976 and 1978, and the World Women Team Olympiad in 1980. She was the non-playing captain of the winning American Venice Cup team in 1989.

In 1965 (as Dorothy Hayden), Truscott became the second woman to play for North America or the United States in the Bermuda Bowl world championship tournament for open teams. (As for Helen Sobel in 1957, her team finished second to Italy.) She was one of the main accusers in a major bridge scandal that involved allegations of cheating brought against the British pair of Terence Reese and Boris Schapiro.

Truscott is the only female player to have won a medal in the World Open Pairs Championship, where she won a bronze medal in 1966. She won a silver medal at the Bermuda Bowl in 1965 and bronze medals at Women's Team Olympiads in 1968, 1972 and 1976 and the World Women Pairs Championship in 1962 and 1974.

She wrote two books on bridge that became best-sellers: Bid Better, Play Better and Winning Declarer Play first published in 1966 and 1969 respectively; each was reprinted several times. She was a contributing editor to several editions of the Official Encyclopedia of Bridge (Alan Truscott, Executive Editor) and wrote two books with Alan: Teach Yourself Basic Bidding in 1976 and The New York Times Bridge Book in 2002. She also published a historical novel in 2002, Hell Gate, about early Dutch settlers in Harlem.

Among new ideas attributed to Truscott are an unusual jump to show a singleton or void along with support in partner's suit (a splinter bid) and responses to Blackwood after interference (DOPI). Both of the systems are now commonly found in bridge partnerships worldwide.

== Bridge accomplishments ==
=== Honors ===
- ACBL Hall of Fame, 1998

=== Wins ===
- WBF World Bridge Championships (4)
  - Venice Cup (3) 1974, 1976, 1978
  - World Women Team Olympiad (1) 1980
- ACBL North American Bridge Championships (26)
  - North American Swiss Teams (1) 1987
  - Master Mixed Teams (1) 1985
  - Women's Board-a-Match Teams (7) 1967, 1970, 1972, 1974, 1975, 1986, 1994
  - Women's Knockout Teams (4) 1976, 1982, 1990, 1993
  - Women's Swiss Teams (1) 1992
  - North American Women's Swiss Teams (2) 1982, 1984
  - Blue Ribbon Pairs (1) 1963
  - Life Master Pairs (1) 1964
  - Fall National Open Pairs (1) 1962
  - Mixed Pairs (2) 1959, 1989
  - Life Master Women's Pairs (3) 1961, 1966, 1978
  - Women's Pairs (2) 1959, 1981

=== Runners-up ===
- WBF World Bridge Championships
  - Bermuda Bowl (1) 1965
- ACBL North American Bridge Championships (18)
  - Vanderbilt (1) 1964
  - Spingold (2) 1965, 1968
  - North American Swiss Teams (1) 1994
  - Master Mixed Teams (4) 1957, 1960, 1967, 1972
  - Women's Board-a-Match Teams (3) 1963, 1964, 1988
  - Women's Knockout Teams (1) 1987
  - Women's Swiss Teams (1) 1995
  - Life Master Women's Pairs (1) 1972
  - Women's Pairs (3) 1968, 1976, 1988
  - Women's Pairs, Spring NABC (1) 1961

== Publications ==
- — (1966). Bid Better, Play Better (1st ed.). New York: Harper & Row, Publishers. LCCN 65-21384. — (1998). Bid Better, Play Better (Revised and updated ed.). Louisville, KY: Devyn Press Inc. ISBN 0-939460-77-7.
- — (1969). Winning Declarer Play (1st ed.). New York: Harper & Row, Publishers. LCCN 68-28201.
- Truscott, Alan; Truscott, Dorothy (1976). Teach Yourself Basic Bidding. New York: Arco Pub Co. ISBN 0668038365. LCCN 75007889. Canadian edition: Bridge Bidding. Toronto: Key Books. (1978), OCLC 15824593
- Truscott, Alan; Truscott, Dorothy (2002). The New York Times Bridge Book: an anecdotal history of the development, personalities, and strategies of the world's most popular card game. New York: St. Martin's Press. ISBN 0-312-33107-X. ISBN 0-312-29090-X (paper).
- — (2002). Hell Gate: the story of the family that settled Harlem as part of the Dutch colony that became New York. Harvard, MA: Morgan Hall Pub. ISBN 0971975604.

Audio-video

- Play Bridge with Omar Sharif (Great Neck, NY: Best Film & Video, 1986) – tips by Omar Sharif with commentary by Truscott OCLC 14955585
