= Emma Ovelius =

Swedish bridge player

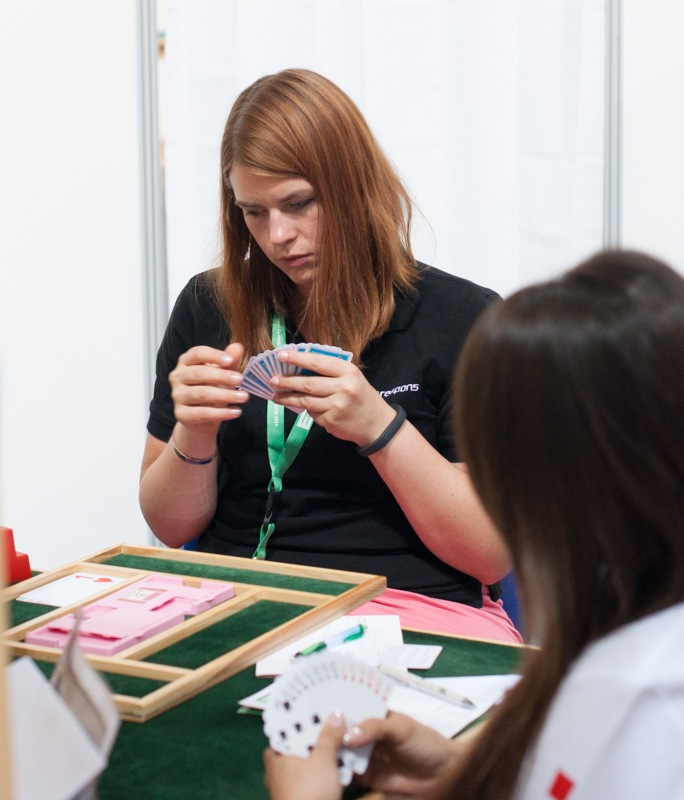
- Emma Sjoberg evaluating her hand

Emma Ovelius is a Swedish world champion bridge player.

== Bridge accomplishments ==
=== Wins ===
- Venice Cup (2) 2019, 2022

=== Runners-up ===
- Venice Cup (1) 2017
