= Brian Senior =

British bridge player and writer

Brian R. Senior (born 1953) is a professional bridge player and writer from Nottingham. He has represented Great Britain, England, Northern Ireland and Ireland in international competition and has won all the major English Bridge Union teams competitions. Senior is also the editor and publisher of the annual official world championship book, under World Bridge Federation auspices.

Senior played once in the World Team Olympiad, on the Ireland open team in 1988, which finished 15–16th in a field of 56.

Asked to name the bridge success "closest to your heart" in April 2014, Senior recalled one of the few Camrose Trophy match wins for Northern Ireland against England—but he has since played one of the few match losses for England against Northern Ireland.

Since 23 August 2019, Senior has been Saturday bridge columnist for The Daily Telegraph.

== Selected works ==
- Clever Bridge Tricks (Faber, 1988)
- Master Counting (Gollancz, 1989), Master Bridge series – published in association with Peter Crawley
- Directing a Club Duplicate (Nottingham: Probray, 1990)
- Weak Two Bids (Probray, 1991), Bridge Players Handbook
- Bread and Butter Bidding (Wheatley, OX: 1991), Maxwell Macmillan Bridge series
- Over Your Shoulder: Learn from the experts, Tony Forrester and Senior (London: Batsford, 1994)
- Raising Partner (Faber, 1994; Batsford, 1995)
- Step-by-step Card Play in Suits (Batsford, 1994)
- The Amazing Book of Bridge: How to master the arts of the greatest of card games (London, Tiger Books International, 1995)
- Play These Hands with Brian Senior (Batsford, 1996)
- Hand Evaluation in Bridge (Batsford, 1998)
- It's Your Lead (1998), How to Play Bridge series
- Practise Your Cue-bidding (Reading: Bridge Plus, 1999) Bridge Plus Practice series
- It's Your Call: Bidding problems answered by international panel (High Wycombe: Five Aces, 2000)
- Competitive Bidding (Batsford, 2000), How to Play Bridge series
- Conventions Today (London: Chess & Bridge, 2001), Better Bridge Now
- Practise Your Trump Coups (Bridge Plus, 2001)
- Suit Contracts: Essential Bridge Plays (Hassocks: D & B Pub, 2003)
- Simply the Best - 20 of the Greatest Bridge Players of All Time (Self-published, 2015)

== Nevena Senior ==
Brian's wife Nevena Mihaylova Senior (born 21 September 1959) is a world champion ladies bridge player and a regular participant in European (European Bridge League) and world (World Bridge Federation) championship tournaments since the late 1980s. As Nevena Deleva she played for the Bulgaria women at least to 1993. She won the 1987 European Women's Pairs Championship partnering Matilda Poplilov. She was playing captain in the European championships. They won bronze medals in the 1988 World Team Olympiad and placed 13th in 1992. By 2000 she played for the England women, who won the same event in both 2008 and 2012 (now as part of the first and second World Mind Sports Games). For the Venice Cup, or odd-years world teams championship, England has qualified with Senior a member of the six-person team in 2003, 2011, and 2013, finishing fourth and second on the latter occasions.

Sometime prior to the 2014 European and world meets (summer and October), Nevena Senior ranked 18th among 73 Women World Grand Masters by world masterpoints (MP). At least for the SportAccord World Mind Games in December 2011, where the England women were second in a four-team showcase, Senior played with Heather Dhondy, recently the 3rd-ranking Grand Master by masterpoints.
