= Nicola Smith =

English bridge player and teacher

Nicola Smith MBE
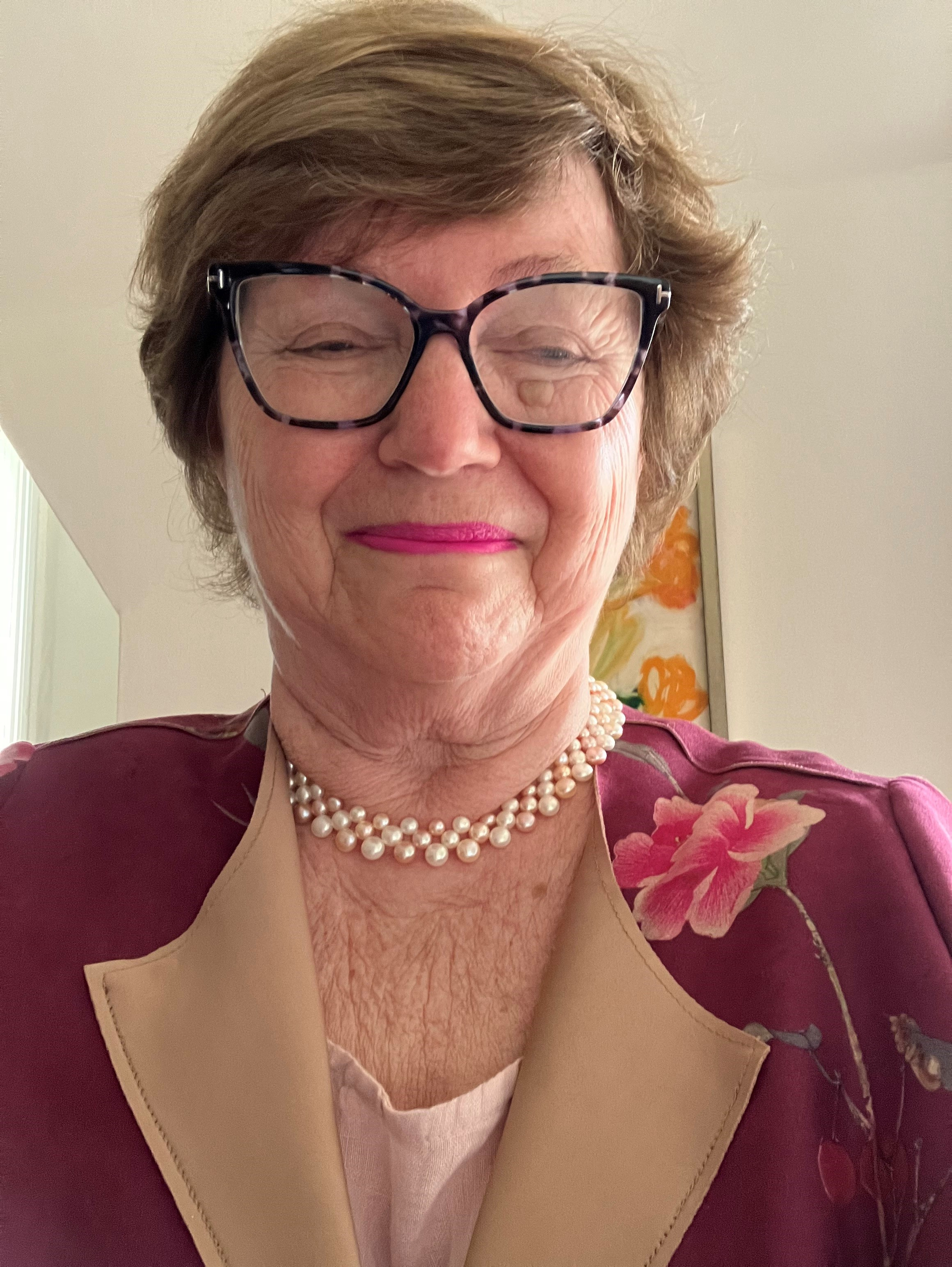
- Smith in 2023
- Born: Nicola Patricia Gardener; 28 April 1949 (age 77); England, United Kingdom
- Occupation: Bridge player
- Spouse: Jonathan Smith (m. 1983)
- Relatives: 2 children

Nicola Patricia Smith MBE, née Gardener (born 28 April 1949), is a world champion English bridge player. She has many successes to her credit in more than 30 years of international competition, initially as Nicola Gardener. As of October 2017 she ranked first among Women World Grand Masters both by world masterpoints (MP) that decay annually and by placing points (PP) that do not.

== Career ==
Gardener was a member of the 1981 Great Britain team that won the world teams championship for women, the Venice Cup; and (now as Nicola Smith) the team that defended its title in 1985, when it was established as a regular odd-years world championship. She was also on the 2nd-place England team in 2013 and in 2017. She played in eight successive World Team Olympiads, which were held every four years until 2004, winning the silver medal on four occasions. She has won the European Women's Teams on nine occasions (1975, 1979, 1981, 1997, 1999, 2001, 2012, 2016, 2026), on the first five occasions for Great Britain and on the last four for England. She won the Generali World Women's Individual event in 1994. In 2008, she was part of the English Ladies team that won the Gold at the first World Mind Sport Games (the successor competition to the Olympiad) in Beijing, China. partnering Sally Brock. The English team retained their title in 2012, Smith again partnering Brock. In 2014 she and Brock played together as part of the England team in that year's European Women's Championship. The team finished second, thereby winning the silver medal and qualifying for the finals of the 2015 World Championships. In that event the England team won the bronze medal. This was Smith's sixteenth world medal, the most won by any woman. In 2016 she was a member of the England team that won the European Women's Championship. This was her eighth win, a record.

She was only sixteen when she played in her first international tournament, at Deauville, winning the teams event in a team which included her father, Nico Gardener, and the young Paul Chemla. She made her representative international debut in the European Championships in Estoril in 1970, partnering Dorothy Shanahan and finishing fourth.

She has won the premier British domestic competition, the Gold Cup, on four occasions: 1975, 1984, 1991 and 2015. Only Boris Schapiro had a longer interval between his first and last wins. She has played twice for England's Open team in the Camrose Trophy, which is competed for by the national teams within the British Isles. In 1998, partnering Pat Davies, she was second in the prestigious Macallan Invitational Pairs (previously known as the Sunday Times Invitational Pairs). She considers this one of her finest achievements.

She has played with the following in long-standing successful partnerships:

- 1967–1973 Rita Oldroyd
- 1974–1977 Sandra Landy
- 1978–1979 Rita Oldroyd
- 1980–1999 Pat Davies
- 2000–2008 Heather Dhondy
- 2008–2016 Sally Brock

In the 2017 Venice Cup she partnered Catherine Draper, and in the 2026 European Championships Nevena Senior.

She comes from a notable bridge family, her parents, Pat and Nico Gardener, both having played for Britain. She ran the London School of Bridge, which her father had founded in 1952, for many years. She still teaches bridge.

In 1981-1982 and 1983, she took part in Grand Slam, televised matches arranged by the BBC between teams representing Britain and the United States. The British team for the second match was Tony Priday, Claude Rodrigue, Nicola Gardener (as she then was) and Pat Davies. The US team was Neil Silverman, Matt Granovetter, Jacqui Mitchell and Gail Moss. The British team won by 32 international match points over 78 deals in seven sessions. The match subsequently formed the basis of a book, in which she was described as follows: "...one of the finest women players in the world. Not only is she an excellent technician – truly, the daughter of her father Nico Gardener – but is equally aggressive and imaginative both in bidding and defence."

Smith was appointed Member of the Order of the British Empire (MBE) in the 1995 New Year Honours for services to bridge. In 2015 she was one of the first two winners of the English Bridge Union's Diamond Award, introduced to recognise players who have "represented England (and earlier Great Britain) with distinction over a long period". In 2017 she was among the first nine players to be made members of the European Bridge League's newly established Hall of Fame.

== Personal life ==
Outside bridge she has worked as a business administrator, but subsequently trained to be a healer. She married Jonathan Smith in 1983; they have two children.
