= Karen Allison =

American bridge player

Karen Allison is an American and Canadian bridge player and frequent Vugraph commentator.

Allison was taught to play bridge by her parents.

Allison is originally from New York and moved to Canada in 1973, however was still eligible to represent USA and did so in 1974 playing with Sally Johnson. Allison lived in Canada from 1973 to 1983 and registered to play for Canada. She won two Open Canadian team trials becoming the first women to represent Canada in an Open Team World Championship. She later won the Women's team trials playing for Valkenberg. Allison was on the board for the Canadian Bridge Federation (CBF) during her time in Canada.

Allison moved back to USA in 1983.

Allison worked on the Laws Commissions and is an editor for several versions of the Bridge Laws.

Allison was the first to report on a World Championship over VuGraph in 1994.

== Bridge accomplishments ==
=== Wins ===
- North American Bridge Championships (5)
  - Machlin Women's Swiss Teams (1) 2004
  - Chicago Mixed Board-a-Match (1) 1983
  - Truscott Senior Swiss Teams (1) 2009
  - Wagar Women's Knockout Teams (2) 1969, 2004

=== Runners-up ===
- World Women Knockout Teams Championship (McConnell Cup) (1) 1994
- North American Bridge Championships (8)
  - Keohane North American Swiss Teams (1) 1995
  - Machlin Women's Swiss Teams (2) 2002, 2005
  - Sternberg Women's Board-a-Match Teams (3) 1986, 1992, 2004
  - Smith Life Master Women's Pairs (1) 1969
  - Wagar Women's Knockout Teams (1) 1981
