= Susan Norton =

England international bridge player

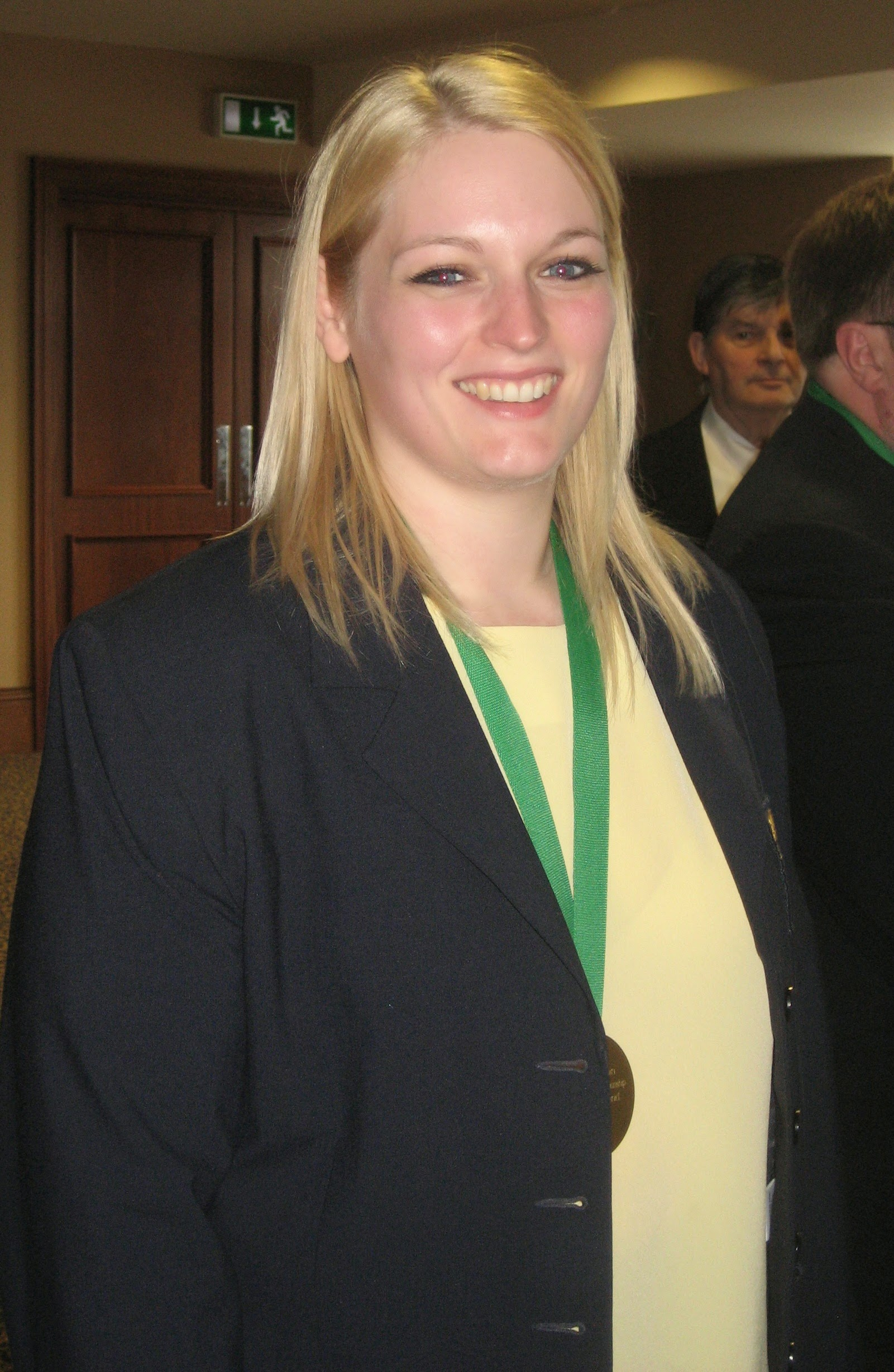
- Born: Susan Stockdale
- Occupations: Bridge player; company director
- Years active: From 1999
- Known for: Women's European Championships 2012 (winner); Women's World Olympiad 2012 (winner); Venice Cup 2013 (silver medal)

Susan Norton (née Stockdale) is an England international and world champion bridge player.

Norton was taught bridge by her parents. She made her junior international debut at the age of 14. She read physics at Oxford University, where she succeeded in combining her academic pursuits with her interests in bridge, athletics and korfball.

At the age of 22, Norton formed a bridge partnership with Bryony Youngs. They were part of an England team which won the Lady Milne Trophy, but their partnership disbanded when Youngs moved to the US to continue her studies. Norton then formed a partnership with Fiona Brown, in which she has had her greatest successes.

Norton has always been a non-professional player, whose bridge career is secondary to her professional career and to her family life. She married in June 2015, and gave birth to a daughter in April 2016. As of 2017, she is a director of a company which markets and distributes products to the veterinary and animal healthcare sectors, and is taking a break from international and 'high level' bridge.

== Bridge accomplishments ==
- Women's European Championships: 2010 2012 (winner)
- Venice Cup: 2011 2013 (silver medal)
- Women's World Olympiad: 2012 (winner)
- European Junior Championships: 2000 2002 2005 and 2007
- Lady Milne Trophy selections: 2005 2006 2007 2009 and 2010
- Junior Camrose selections: 2007 and 2008
- Peggy Bayer Trophy selections: 1999 2000 and 2002
