= Sanna Clementsson =

Swedish bridge player

Sanna Clementsson (born 19 July 2000) is a Swedish world champion bridge player. In April 2022, she achieved the title of World Grand Master as the youngest female player ever. She was 19 when she became the youngest winner of the Venice Cup in 2019.

== Bridge accomplishments ==
=== Wins ===
- Venice Cup (2) 2019, 2022
