= Fritzi Gordon =

Austrian-British bridge player

Fritzi Gordon (1906 (Note: The ODNB is sure she was born in 1906 in Vienna. Dormer gives the birth year of 1905. Both the English Bridge Union and The Official Encyclopedia of Bridge give 1916. Markus said Gordon had died at the age of 86, which implies the earlier birth date. Truscott said she was "born in Graz, Austria, in 1916 by her account but probably much earlier.") – 8 February 1992) was an Austrian-born British bridge player, half of the most famous and tempestuous female partnership in the game's history. Following her long-time partner Rixi Markus, she was the second woman to attain the rank of WBF World Grand Master. She won four world titles, eight European championships and numerous other tournaments.

== Life ==
Gordon was born Frederika Leist in either Graz or Vienna to middle-class Jewish parents. After school, she became the buyer for a Salzburg store, married Paul Gordon and moved to Graz.

The annexation of Austria by Germany in 1938 (Anschluss) disrupted her life, as it did to so many others. She fled to London with her husband, though the details of this abrupt transition are not known. Her brother, Dr. Hans Leist, also came to Britain. (Also a fine bridge player, he was a member of five Gold Cup-winning teams between 1946 and 1953.)

When Gordon left Austria, Markus recalled in her obituary tribute, "[she] was not known in the bridge world while I was already a world champion. (Note: As Rixi Scharfstein, Markus had been a member of the Austria ladies team that won the European championships 1935 to 1937 and the one pre-war, 1937 world championship.) But she made up for it soon after arriving in Britain ... Paul served in the war with the Pioneer Corps so Fritzi was freed of all restrictions imposed on aliens."

Despite their shared cultural heritage and experiences, Gordon and Markus were not personal friends. Success tied them together, but they were often at odds despite their success. Their "discussions" at the table were quite famous, and earned them the soubriquets Frisky and Bitchy. Mrs Gordon was not a bridge writer and her private life remained private. She is consequently the less well known of the pair.

The actress Tara Summers is her granddaughter. In 2005, Summers described in the Daily Telegraph the unusual circumstances in which her grandmother gave birth to her (Summers') mother:

My mother was born under a poker table. My grandmother, a world champion bridge player, had been dealt a royal flush just as she went into labour, and she chose to play the hand, rather than go to hospital. She was excited about having a child but adamant that she was not going to let it get in the way of her game. Her gambling addiction, although it may sound glamorous, proved to be just as damaging as any substance or alcohol dependency.

== Bridge career ==
According to Truscott, Gordon had learned bridge from her brother Hans in Austria, and she was a "world-class player" by the end of the war. Even at the European-level, however, international competition resumed only with the 1948 European Bridge League championships.

Gordon's tournament bridge career began after World War II, and her first partnership with Markus began half-way through the European Championships of 1950. In 1955 they agreed to form a regular partnership, which became one of the most successful women's pairs in bridge history. The partnership lasted until 1975.

Gordon won the World Women's teams 1964; World Mixed teams 1962; World Women's pairs 1962 and 1974 (placed second in 1970). She won the European Women's teams in 1950, 1951, 1952, 1959, 1961, 1963, 1966 and 1975. These were Britain's first eight wins in the tournament, the 1975 win coming in her final appearance in the event.

She represented Britain on nine other occasions and toured the US in 1953 as part of the British women's team. Her national successes include the Gold Cup in 1957 and 1961.

Ewart Kempson thought she was "Our own greatest woman player, [able] to play on equal terms with the greatest men players".

Victor Mollo agreed that she played like a man:

"Few men play as well as Fritzi Gordon. No woman plays better. But it is with the men ... that she should be compared for Fritzi's bridge is intensely masculine and he-man stuff at that."
"Where Rixi Markus is fiery, Fritzi Gordon is icy cold. Where Rixi takes her contracts by storm, Fritzi makes hers through merciless efficiency ..."

Terence Reese thought she was at least as good as her more famous partner:

"Fritzi played like a top-class man – like her brother Hans Leist, in fact. To tell the truth – and why not? – Rixi was not quite the equal of Fritzi as an all round player."

Rixi Markus herself wrote:

"Fritzi Gordon was a wonderful player. She may even have had a slight advantage over me in that she was more controlled and less impetuous."

== Bridge accomplishments ==
=== Wins ===
- World Women Pairs Championship (2) 1962, 1974
- World Olympiad Women's Teams Championship (1) 1964
- Gold Cup (2) 1957, 1961

=== Runners-up ===
- Venice Cup (1) 1976
- World Women Pairs Championship (1) 1970
- World Olympiad Women's Teams Championship (1) 1976
