= Kathrine Bertheau =

Swedish bridge player

- Born: 31 March 1975 (age 50); Bergen, Norway

Kathrine Bertheau (born 31 March 1975) is a Swedish world champion bridge player.

== Bridge accomplishments ==
=== Wins ===
- European Women Teams Championship: 2004
- Venice Cup (2) 2019, 2022

=== Runners-up ===
- Venice Cup (1) 2017
