= Catherine D'Ovidio =

French bridge player (1959–2020)

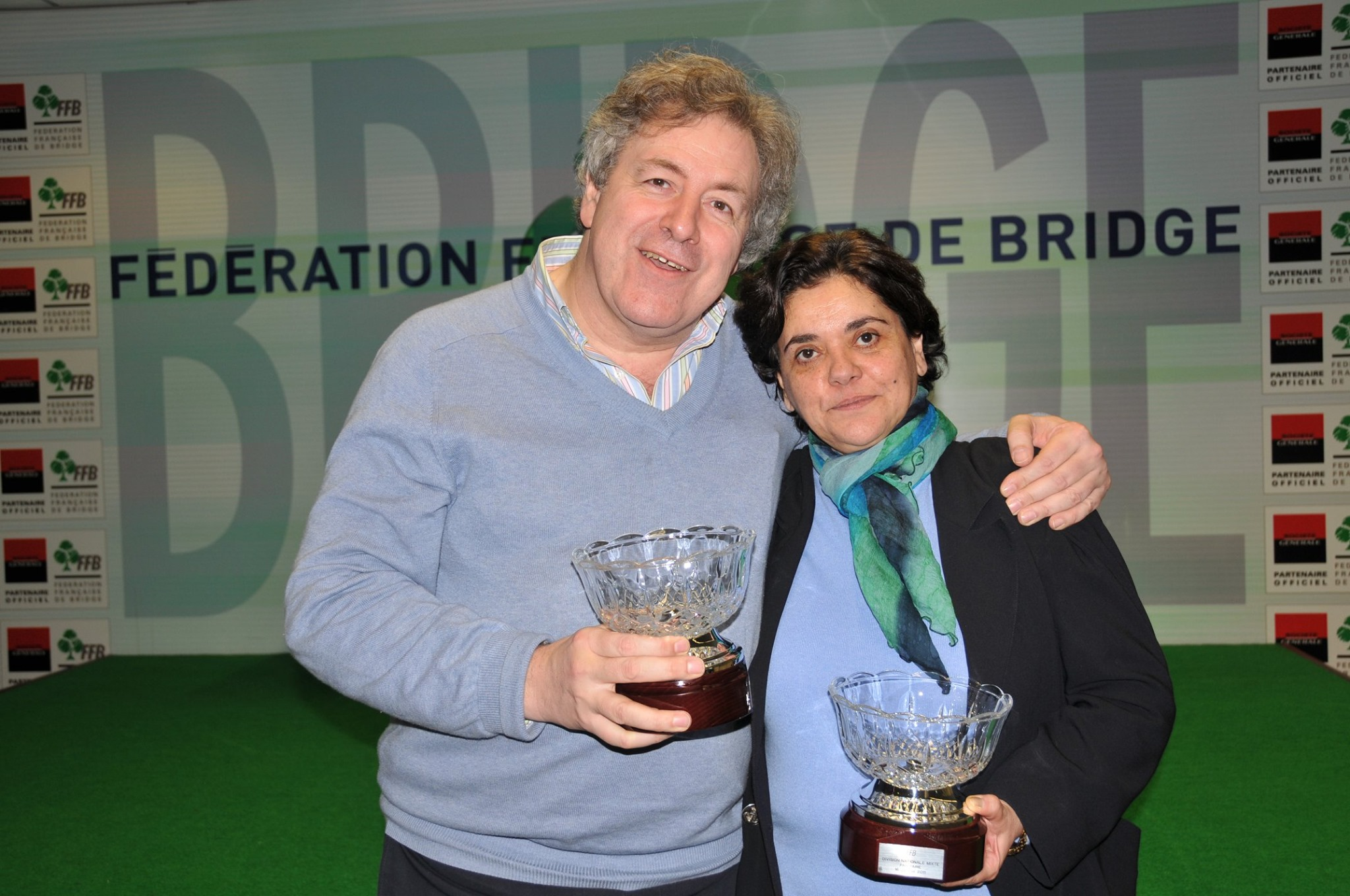
Catherine D'Ovidio bridge world champion

Catherine D'Ovidio (1959 – 28 August 2020) was a French bridge player. She was 61 years old.

== Bridge accomplishments ==
=== Wins ===
- World Mixed Teams (1) 2004
- Venice Cup (2) 2005, 2011
- North American Bridge Championships (1)
  - Wagar Women's Knockout Teams (1) 2013

=== Runners-up ===
- World Mixed Teams (1) 2000
- Venice Cup (1) 2001
- North American Bridge Championships (1)
  - Machlin Women's Swiss Teams (1) 2010
