= Sally Brock =

English bridge player

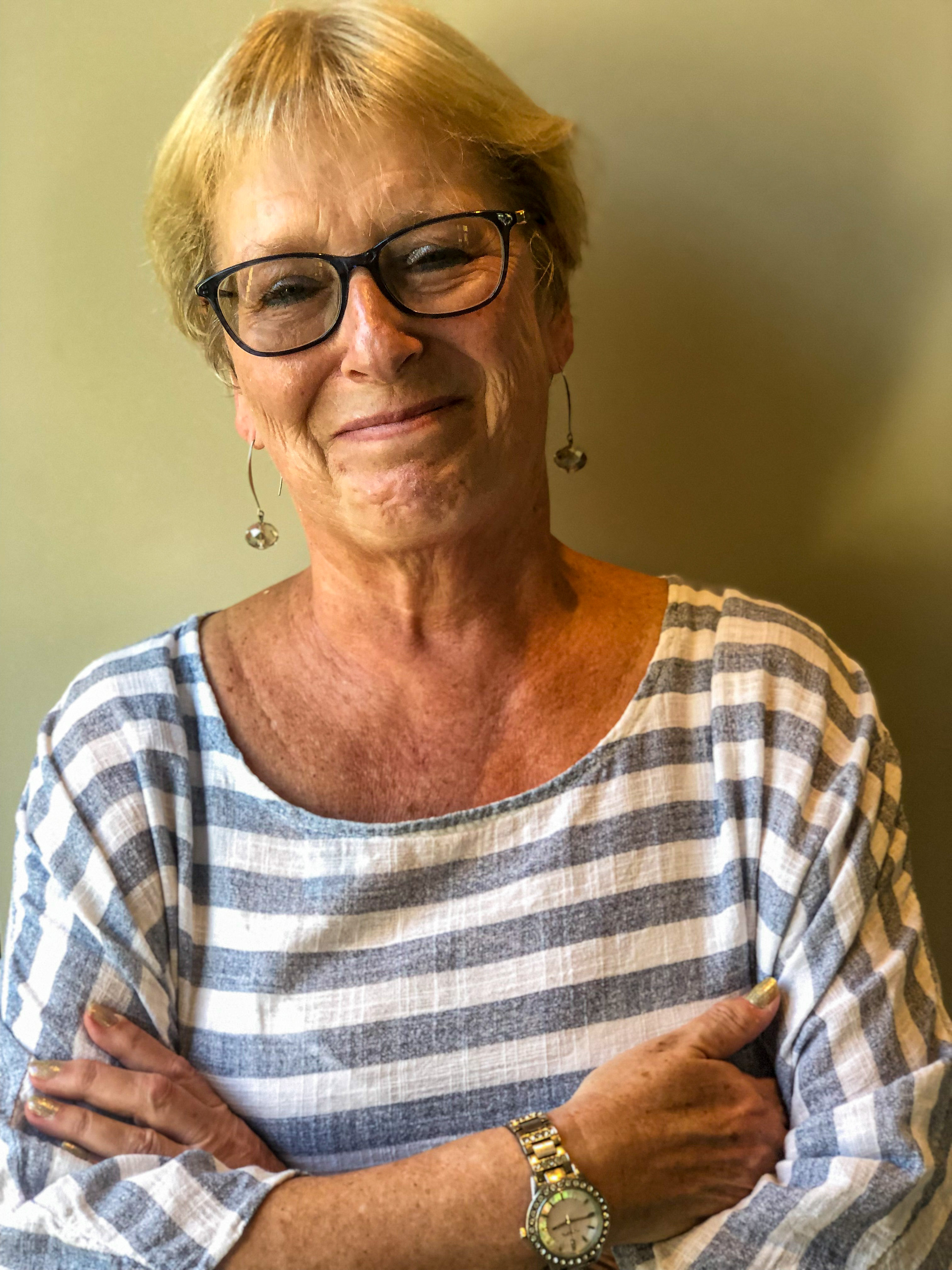
Sally Brock,2020

Saralinda Jane "Sally" Brock (née Hartley; born 1953) is an English bridge player. She has been part of the winning team in five Women's European Championships, two Venice Cups and two World Team Olympiads. In November 2017, she received the Diamond Award from the English Bridge Union (EBU) in recognition of her outstanding contribution to England's international teams.

== Life ==
Brock was educated at Godolphin School and Nottingham University, where she met her first husband Tony Sowter. In 1981 she married Mark Horton. In 1993 she married Raymond Brock, who died in 2008. She has three children: Ben, Briony and Toby.

== Bridge career ==
In 1976, she played her first Lady Milne Championship with Sally Eggett, heavily pregnant with her first child Benjamin. In 1979, she played her first European Championship with Sandra Landy, which they won. In 1980, they won a Bronze at the European Championships. In 1981, they won the European Championship again as well as the Venice Cup. In 1987 she began playing bridge with Steve Lodge.

Brock resumed her bridge career in 2000, initially in the mixed teams in Masstricht partnering Jason Hackett. She then formed a partnership with Margaret Courtney where they won the European Championship in 2001 in Tenerife. In 2004, she played with Kitty Teltscher in the Olympiad in Istanbul, where they won a bronze medal.

In 2008, she formed a partnership with Nicola Smith, and that year they won the gold medal at the World Mind Sports Games in Beijing. They were a regular partnership in the England women's team contending for the Venice Cup in 2011 (4th), 2013 (2nd) and 2015 (3rd). In that period they also competed in four European Championships including 2012 (gold), 2014 (silver) and 2016 (gold). They also were part of the World Teams winners in Lille in 2012, and Sanya in 2014.

In 2015 Brock was appointed as Squad Leader for England's Under 25 Women's Squad.

In 2017, Brock began a partnership with Fiona Brown, and later that same year they were part of the England team that came second in the Venice Cup.

She is the bridge correspondent of the Sunday Times.

== National events ==
- Gold Cup 1984, 1989, 1990
- Crockfords 1985, 1987, 1990, 2004
- National Teams Congress 1990
- Hubert Phillips 2000, 2001, 2002, 2004, 2014, 2016, 2019
- Tollemache 2013, 2014

== European Championships ==
- Gold Switzerland, 1979 – playing with Sandra Landy
- Gold UK, 1981 – playing with Sandra Landy
- Bronze Germany, 1983 – playing with Sandra Landy
- Silver Italy, 1985 – playing with Sandra Landy
- Bronze UK, 1987 – playing with Sandra Landy
- Gold Tenerife, 2001 – playing with Margaret James
- Gold Ireland, 2012 – playing with Nicola Smith
- Silver Croatia, 2014 – playing with Nicola Smith
- Gold Hungary, 2016 – playing with Nicola Smith

== Olympiad ==
- Bronze Netherlands, 1980 – playing with Sandra Landy
- Bronze France, 1982 – playing with Sandra Landy
- Silver USA, 1984 – playing with Sandra Landy
- Bronze USA, 1986 – playing with Sandra Landy
- Bronze Turkey, 2004 – playing with Kitty Teltscher
- Gold China, 2008 – playing with Nicola Smith
- Gold China, 2008 – playing with Nicola Smith

== Venice Cup ==
- Gold USA, 1981 – playing with Sandra Landy
- Gold Brazil, 1985 – playing with Sandra Landy
- Silver India, 2015 – playing with Nicola Smith
- Silver France, 2017 – playing with Fiona Brown

== McConnell Cup ==
- Gold China, 2014 – playing with Nicola Smith
- Gold USA, 2018- playing with Fiona Brown
- Silver USA, 2018 – mixed teams playing with Chris Wilenken
