= 2021 World Bridge Team Championships =

Tournament information
- Sport: Contract bridge
- Location: (Italy) Salsomaggiore Terme
- Dates: 27 March–9 April 2022
- Teams: 96

Final positions
- Champions: France and Poland

The 2021 World Bridge Team Championships (45th) was a contract bridge event being held in Salsomaggiore Terme, Italy, from 27 March to 9 April 2022, delayed from its original schedule due to the COVID-19 pandemic.

During the event, the 45th Bermuda Bowl, the 23rd Venice Cup, the 11th d'Orsi Trophy and the 2nd Wuhan Cup were contested. The NBO Trophy was cancelled after Round 6 because too many teams withdrew, compromising the technical integrity of the tournament.

Teams representing France and Poland were the most successful medalists, each capturing one gold and one bronze. The only other nation to capture more than one medal was the United States, with one silver and one bronze.

== Medalists ==
Event	Gold	Silver	Bronze
Bermuda Bowl	Switzerland	Netherlands	United States 1 Norway
Venice Cup	Sweden	Turkey	England; Poland
d'Orsi Trophy	Poland	India	Denmark; France
Wuhan Cup	France	United States	Italy; Germany

== Medals ==
* Host nation (Italy)

Rank	Nation	Gold	Silver	Bronze	Total
1	France (FRA)	1	0	1	2
1	Poland (POL)	1	0	1	2
3	Sweden (SWE)	1	0	0	1
3	Switzerland (SWI)	1	0	0	1
5	United States (USA)	0	1	1	2
6	India (IND)	0	1	0	1
6	Netherlands (NED)	0	1	0	1
6	Turkey (TUR)	0	1	0	1
9	Denmark (DEN)	0	0	1	1
9	England (ENG)	0	0	1	1
9	Germany (GER)	0	0	1	1
9	Italy (ITA)*	0	0	1	1
9	Norway (NOR)	0	0	1	1
Totals (13 entries)		4	4	8	16

== Swiss Teams ==
Play of the NBO Trophy is suspended after Round 6.

Rankings (Round 6)

Rank Team VPs

1 USA 1 Women 83.07

2 ISRAEL Mixed 81.13

3 SOUTH AFRICA 73.65

4 NEW ZEALAND BB 73.44

== Bermuda Bowl ==
=== Round robin ===
Key
Teams to Playoffs

Rank	Team	VP
1	Switzerland	312.24
2	Netherlands	307.38
3	United States 2	301.13
4	Hungary	290.11
5	England	287.30
6	Italy	286.03
7	Norway	284.53
8	United States 1	272.29
9	Denmark	263.00
10	Israel	262.49
11	Sweden	258.10
12	Australia	254.40
13	India	245.39
14	Bulgaria	225.11
15	New Zealand	220.44
16	Egypt	214.33
17	Hong Kong	211.23
18	South Africa	191.55
19	Canada	191.06
20	Guadeloupe	164.90
21	United Arab Emirates	141.68
22	Singapore	119.65
23	Uruguay	106.90
24	Argentina	97.16

=== Final round ===
Quarterfinals
Switzerland	20	23	43	18	41	37	182
England	49	21	22	17	18	12	139
Hungary	19	33	29	16	2	45	144
United States 1	19	25	26	46	54	21	191
United States 2	15	7	27	31	19	17	116
Norway	18	11	37	47	17	45	175
Netherlands	51	6	28	31	11	57	184
Italy	21	35	29	25	23	18	151

Semifinals
Switzerland	6	66	35	27	39	57	230
United States 1	42	10	51	43	9	19	182
Norway	12	37	16	5	8	0	78
Netherlands	32	45	54	27	34	0	192

Finals
Switzerland	40	18	35	37	13	24	167
Netherlands	36	37	22	22	24	19	164

== Venice Cup ==
=== Round robin ===
Key
Teams to Playoffs

Rank	Team	VP
1	Poland	352.04
2	England	304.29
3	Sweden	294.70
4	United States 2	294.65
5	Turkey	279.27
6	Italy	276.58
7	Denmark	261.10
8	France	260.14
9	Norway	258.94
10	United States 1	256.88
11	Canada	240.42
12	Scotland	222.37
13	Portugal	215.25
14	Hungary	214.82
15	Belgium	212.19
16	Australia	208.55
17	Spain	202.76
18	Germany	193.97
19	Egypt	189.49
20	Argentina	182.27
21	Brazil	175.63
22	Morocco	166.89
23	United Arab Emirates	125.37
24	India	114.23

=== Final round ===
Quarterfinals
Poland	29	32	34	9	37	61	202
Denmark	32	31	29	30	45	2	169
Sweden	48	25	31	37	51	29	221
Italy	36	19	19	58	29	20	181
United States 2	18	34	9	43	12	0	116
Turkey	61	44	58	27	51	0	241
England	46	32	32	63	20	26	219
France	33	37	58	5	11	26	170

Semifinals
Poland	24	51	45	18	12	63	213
Sweden	15	76	39	16	27	42	215
Turkey	34	37	59	18	43	45	236
England	30	28	22	41	35	37	193

Finals
Sweden	54	39	15	31	62	52	253
Turkey	18	17	28	46	30	31	170

== d'Orsi Trophy ==
=== Round robin ===
Key
Teams to Playoffs

Rank	Team	VP
1	United States 1	324.09
2	Denmark	287.64
3	Poland	279.94
4	France	275.74
5	India	268.35
6	Sweden	267.89
7	United States 2	263.36
8	Bulgaria	259.89
9	Iceland	253.45
10	Turkey	250.78
11	Italy	245.57
12	Argentina	245.44
13	England	241.80
14	Canada	237.40
15	Netherlands	223.81
16	Belgium	222.87
17	Australia	220.34
18	Germany	214.99
19	Norway	213.58
20	Pakistan	212.46
21	Morocco	145.93
22	Brazil	124.59
23	Egypt	120.49
24	Guadeloupe	84.47

=== Final round ===
Quarterfinals
United States 1	8	24	44	29	14	23	146
India	9	34	30	25	27	25	150
France	29	62	76	0	0	0	167
Sweden	11	12	28	0	0	0	51
Poland	34	32	19	0	0	0	85
Bulgaria	22	11	29	0	0	0	62
Denmark	52	7	42	31	42	10	183
United States 2	22	33	17	26	9	45	152

Semifinals
India	16	57	37	57	37	21	225
France	21	19	61	14	41	41	197
Poland	38	42	45	23	33	51	232
Denmark	30	69	23	32	13	28	195

Finals
India	29	34	24	44	28	35	194
Poland	47	44	39	34	57	18	239

== Wuhan Cup ==
=== Round robin ===
Key
Teams to Playoffs

Rank	Team	VP
1	France	304.85
2	United States 1	303.58
3	Belgium	296.71
4	Poland	292.77
5	Italy	291.89
6	Romania	289.80
7	Latvia	270.61
8	Germany	270.36
9	Denmark	267.08
10	Australia	259.19
11	Netherlands	251.56
12	Israel	236.24
13	United States 2	235.62
14	Croatia	235.12
15	Portugal	227.11
16	Argentina	218.53
17	Turkey	217.07
18	India	212.69
19	Jordan	196.13
20	Singapore	183.11
21	Egypt	152.84
22	Chile	127.65
23	Guatemala	89.19
24	Tunisia	76.40

=== Final round ===
Quarterfinals
France	50	32	15	56	23	13	189
Romania	32	30	28	5	36	50	181
Belgium	27	34	33	31	18	21	164
Germany	13	40	33	18	44	32	180
Poland	34	56	17	39	20	21	187
Italy	32	36	28	39	34	49	218
United States 1	29	32	68	2	30	51	212
Latvia	55	24	18	25	32	31	185

Semifinals
France	52	64	57	13	42	0	228
Germany	20	47	26	30	31	0	154
Italy	13	44	6	37	42	9	151
United States 1	13	26	58	31	37	56	221

Finals
France	44	38	24	43	30	19	199
United States 1	46	27	13	39	18	20	163
