= Maria Erhart =

Austrian bridge player

Maria Erhart (née Kirner; 15 November 1944 – 2 September 2011), was an Austrian international bridge player, who had the rare distinction of playing for her country's Open team as well as for the Women's team. She reached the highest rank in the game, World Grand Master, and was a member of the Austrian teams which won the women's event at the European Team Championships in 1991, the World Team Olympiad the following year and the World Championships in 1998. She was described in Bridge Magazine as "one of the finest and most charismatic players in the history of the game".

== Early life ==
She was born in Vienna, and in later life lived in Rattenberg. There she studied at the world trade university, which led to a job in market research. She married Peter Erhart, a medical doctor and like herself an international bridge player, in 1987. She worked as his assistant, as well as looking after the commercial aspect of his practice.

== Bridge accomplishments ==
She began playing bridge in 1969. Just a year after taking up the game she took part in a tournament in Venice, where she met the top Italian players.

- In 1971 she met Rixi Markus, and thereafter they played together once or twice a year. In 1992 they won the St. Moritz Teams just two months before Markus's death.
- Only five years after taking up the game she made her international debut, not in the Austrian Women's team but in the Open team.
- A year later, in 1975, she was a member of the Austrian Women's team which won a bronze medal at the European Team Championships, partnering Barbara Lindinger.
- In 1991, she decided that in future she would play mainly in Women's events, in spite of being able to command a place in the Austrian Open team. This immediately paid dividends when the Austrian Women's team which she had helped to put together won that year's European Championships at Killarney, and they followed this by winning the Olympiad in Salsomaggiore the following year.
- In 1992, she won the Generali Women's World Masters Individual event, but shortly afterwards she contracted an illness that prevented her from playing again at the top level until 1996, when she won the European Mixed Pairs partnered by Fritz Kubak.
- In 1998 she was a member of the Austrian women's team which won the McConnell Cup, the World Championship, in Lille, and the following year the team was second in the European Championships held in Malta.
- In 2002 she was a member of the Lavazza team which won the European Mixed Teams event in Ostend, and in 2003 she won the European Women's Pairs in Menton partnering Jovi Smederevac.

== Personal ==
Her hobbies included classical music, and playing tennis and golf. She also oversaw community work for the Rattenberg council.

In later life she suffered from an incapacitating disease. In spite of this handicap, at the 2011 St. Moritz tournament she won the Teams event, finished second in the Open Pairs and third in the Mixed Pairs.
