= Pat Davies (bridge player) =

Pat Davies is a world-champion English bridge player. Her partners have included Nicola Smith (from 1980 to 1999) with whom she played in two BBC-televised bridge series Grand Slam, broadcast in 1981–2 and 1983. She was awarded the prestigious English Bridge Union Diamond award in 2017 for her outstanding contribution to English bridge in both domestic and international competitions dating back to 1977.

== Bridge accomplishments ==
=== Wins ===
- Women's European Bridge Championships (3) 1981, 1997 and 1999
- Venice Cup (2) 1981 and 1986
- Gold Cup 1991
