= Venice Cup =

Biennial world championship contract bridge tournament

The Venice Cup is a biennial world championship contract bridge tournament for national teams of women. It is contested every odd-number year under the auspices of the World Bridge Federation (WBF), alongside the Bermuda Bowl (open), Wuhan Cup (mixed), and d'Orsi Bowl (seniors). Entries formally represent WBF Zones as well as nations, so it is also known as the World Zonal Women Team Championship, one of three World Zonal Team Championships. It was first contested in 1974 as one long match between two teams and has been concurrent with the Bermuda Bowl from 1985.

The Venice Cup is also the name of the trophy awarded to the winning team. It was donated by Italy when Venice hosted the inaugural contest.

The most recent event took place in 2023 in Marrakesh, Morocco.

== Structure ==
See a description of the identical "Senior Bowl" structure or a detailed account of the 2011 event (below)

== 1937 world championships ==
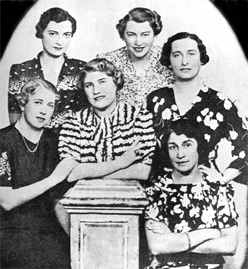
The 1937 world champion Austria ladies team. Top left, Rixi Scharfstein. Others from left: Marianne Boschan, Gertie Brunner, Ethel Ernst, Elizabeth Klauber, Gertie Schlesinger (seated).

Austria won the first world teams championships in both open and women categories, conducted 1937 in Budapest, Hungary. They were organized by the International Bridge League, essentially the predecessor of both the European Bridge League (est. 1947) and the WBF (1958). World War II practically destroyed the IBL and its nascent world championship tournament series. With Austria the leading nation at the card table, the 1938 Anschluss of Germany and Austria was a great disruption. The leading bridge theorist and mentor, Paul Stern was an outspoken opponent of Nazism who fled to England that year.

Another 1938 refugee from Austria to England, Rixi Markus (born Erika Scharfstein) was a member of both the 1937 champions and the 1976 Great Britain team that was defeated by the United States for the second Venice Cup.

== Historical results ==
China is the only bridge nation outside Europe and the United States to win the Venice Cup. Following its third-place breakthrough in 1991, China finished second in 1997 and 2003, and third in 2007, before winning in 2009.

Every Venice Cup tournament has run alongside the Bermuda Bowl except in 1978, which was not a Bermuda Bowl year. Before 1985, however, the Open tournament was more frequent; from that time they have run together in odd years.

United States teams won the first three championships and they have won 10 of 17 including six as one of two USA teams. (Note: Complete final standings for the entire history show double representation for the US from 1985 to date except 1989. Select "Venue" links at "World Team Championships to Date". WBF. Retrieved 2011-08-17.)

The first two "tournaments" were head-on matches between representatives of North America and Europe, like the Bermuda Bowls of 1951 to 1957. The next two were open to one team from every WBF geographic zone. From 1985 the Venice Cup and Bermuda Bowl have run side-by-side in odd years, expanding together from 10 to 22.

Prior to the inaugural Venice Cup, there had been four Olympiad tournaments for women contested 1960 to 1972. The winners had been United Arab Republic, Great Britain, Sweden, and Italy. (After losing the first Venice Cup tournament in 1974, Italy would defend its Olympiad title in 1976 and lose the third Venice Cup in 1978.) (The United States won the first three Venice Cups 1974/76/78 but did not win any early Olympiad tournament.)

Year, Site, Entries		Medalists
1974 May 20–28 Venice, Italy 2 teams	1.	(United States) USA; Bette Cohn, Emma Jean Hawes, Dorothy Hayden Truscott, Betty Ann Kennedy, Marietta Passell, Carol Sanders
1974 May 20–28 Venice, Italy 2 teams	2.	Italy; Marisa Bianchi, Luciana Canessa, Rina Jabès, Maria Antonietta Robaudo, Anna Valenti, Maria Vittoria Venturini
1976 May 2–8 Monte Carlo, Monaco 2 teams	1.	(United States) USA; Emma Jean Hawes, Dorothy Hayden Truscott, Betty Ann Kennedy, Jacqui Mitchell, Gail Moss, Carol Sanders
1976 May 2–8 Monte Carlo, Monaco 2 teams	2.	(United Kingdom) Great Britain; Charley Esterson, Nicola Gardener, Fritzi Gordon, Sandra Landy, Rixi Markus, Rita Oldroyd
1978 June 17–30 New Orleans, USA (separate from Bermuda Bowl) 5 teams	1.	(United States) USA; Mary Jane Farell, Emma Jean Hawes, Dorothy Hayden Truscott, Marilyn Johnson, Jacqui Mitchell, Gail Moss
1978 June 17–30 New Orleans, USA (separate from Bermuda Bowl) 5 teams	2.	Italy; Marisa Bianchi, Luciana Capodanno, Marisa D'Andrea, Enrichetta Gut, Andreina Morini, Anna Valenti
1978 June 17–30 New Orleans, USA (separate from Bermuda Bowl) 5 teams	3.	Argentina; María Teresa de Díaz, Adriana C. de Martínez de Hoz, Maria Elena Iacapraro, Marta Matienzo, Clara Monsegur
1981 October 19–30 New York City, USA 5 teams	1.	(United Kingdom) Great Britain; Pat Davies, Nicola Gardener, Sandra Landy, Sally Sowter, (Maureen Dennison, Diana Williams)*
1981 October 19–30 New York City, USA 5 teams	2.	(United States) USA; Nancy Gruver, Edith Kemp, Betty Ann Kennedy, Judi Radin, Carol Sanders, Kathie Wei
1981 October 19–30 New York City, USA 5 teams	3.	Brazil; Agota Mandelot, Sylvia Mello, Elisabeth Murtinho, Suzy Powidzer, (Maria Lena Brito, Alice Saad)**

* Dennison–Williams in 1981 did not play enough boards to qualify for the title of World Champion
** Brito–Saad in 1981 did not play enough boards to qualify for third place

The third and fourth Venice Cup tournaments welcomed one team from each WBF geographic zone. On both occasions there were entries from Europe, North America, South America, and South Pacific; they were joined by Asia in 1978, Central America and the Caribbean in 1981. All of the entries were national teams, listed here by zone.

1978: Italy, USA, Argentina, Australia, Philippines
1981: Great Britain, USA, Brazil, Australia, Venezuela

Except for USA ahead of Italy in 1979, those were also the final standings. (Under the same rules, there were six teams in the 1979 Bermuda Bowl tournament because Asia and CAC both participated. A second team from Europe was added in 1981.)

=== 1985 ===
The fifth Venice Cup was not until 1985, when the two tournaments were permanently joined side-by-side in odd years with the same structure (like the Olympiad tournaments established in 1960). Since then, the numbers of teams entered have been identical except once.

For 1985 the champion teams from Europe and North America were granted slots in the 4-team semifinal knockout. One representative from every other zone, the host country team, and second teams from Europe and North America, played round-robin for the other two semifinal slots. As for all three renditions under that format, five other zones participated (not yet Africa) and there were ten teams in the field.

1985 Venice Cup, final standings

1. Great Britain (Europe 2)
2. USA 1 (North America 1)
3. France (Europe 1)
4. Chinese Taipei (Pacific Asia)
5. USA 2 (North America 2)
6. Australia (South Pacific)
7. Argentina (South America)
8. Brazil (host country)
9. Venezuela (Central America & Carib.)
10. India (Asia & Middle East)

Year, Site, Entries		Medalists
1985 Oct 19–Nov 2 São Paulo, Brazil 10 teams	1.	(United Kingdom) Great Britain; Pat Davies, Sally Horton, Sandra Landy, Nicola Smith, (Michelle Brunner, Gillian Scott-Jones)*
1985 Oct 19–Nov 2 São Paulo, Brazil 10 teams	2.	(United States) USA 1 Betty Ann Kennedy, Jacqui Mitchell, Gail Moss, Judi Radin, Carol Sanders, Kathie Wei
1985 Oct 19–Nov 2 São Paulo, Brazil 10 teams	3.	(France) France; Danièle Allouche, Véronique Bessis, Ginette Chevalley, Fabienne Pigeaud, Catherine Saul, Sylvie Willard
1987 October 10–24 Ocho Ríos, Jamaica 10 teams	1.	(United States) USA 2 Cheri Bjerkan, Juanita Chambers, Lynn Deas, Beth Palmer, Judi Radin, Kathie Wei
1987 October 10–24 Ocho Ríos, Jamaica 10 teams	2.	France; Danièle Allouche, Véronique Bessis, Hélène Bordenave, Ginette Chevalley, Bénédicte Cronier, Sylvie Willard
1987 October 10–24 Ocho Ríos, Jamaica 10 teams	3.	Italy; Marisa Bianchi, Luciana Capodanno, Marisa D'Andrea, Carla Gianardi, Gabriella Olivieri, Anna Valenti
1989 September 9–23 Perth, Australia 10 teams	1.	United States; Kitty Bethe, Lynn Deas, Margie Gwozdzinsky, Karen McCallum, Beth Palmer, Kerri Shuman
1989 September 9–23 Perth, Australia 10 teams	2.	Netherlands; Carla Arnolds, Ellen Bakker, Ine Gielkens, Elly Schippers, Marijke van der Pas, Bep Vriend
1989 September 9–23 Perth, Australia 10 teams	3.	Canada; Francine Cimon, Dianna Gordon, Mary Paul, Sharyn Reus, Gloria Silverman, Katie Thorpe
1991 Sep 29–Oct11 Yokohama, Japan 16 teams	1.	(United States) USA 2 Nell Cahn, Stasha Cohen, Lynn Deas, Sharon Osberg, Nancy Passell, Sue Picus
1991 Sep 29–Oct11 Yokohama, Japan 16 teams	2.	Austria; Gabriele Bamberger, Maria Erhart, Doris Fischer, Terry Weigkricht, (Rosi Spinn, Britta Widengren)***
1991 Sep 29–Oct11 Yokohama, Japan 16 teams	3.	China; GU Ling, LIU Yiqian, SUN Ming, ZHANG Yalan, (SHAOMIN Shi, WANG Liping)**

=== 1991 to date ===
After 1989, the championship fields were expanded from 10 to 16 teams. European and North American zones were granted four and three slots respectively, without special treatment for any. (The American Contract Bridge League allocated two places to United States teams and one to the winner of a playoff, if necessary.)

1991 Venice Cup participants by zone
Europe: Austria, Germany, Netherlands, Great Britain (1st to 4th in Europe)
North America: USA 1, USA 2, Canada
South America: Argentina, Venezuela
C. America & Carib.: Martinique
Asia & Middle E.: India
Pacific Asia: China, Chinese Taipei, Japan (host)
South Pacific: Australia
Africa: Egypt

All three teams from Pacific Asia advanced to the quarterfinal knockout stage, a very strong performance. China became the first team from outside Europe and the Americas to win a medal.

Through 1993, United States teams won seven and Great Britain two.

Year, Site, Entries		Medalists
1993 Aug 29–Sep 11 Santiago, Chile 16 teams	1.	(United States) USA 2 Karen McCallum, Jill Meyers, Sharon Osberg, Sue Picus, Kerri Sanborn, Kay Schulle
1993 Aug 29–Sep 11 Santiago, Chile 16 teams	2.	Germany; Daniela von Arnim, Karin Caesar, Marianne Mögel, Pony Nehmert, Waltraud Vogt, Sabine Zenkel
1993 Aug 29–Sep 11 Santiago, Chile 16 teams	3.	Sweden; Lisbeth Åström, Pyttsi Flodqvist, Linda Långström, Catarina Midskog, Bim Ödlund, Mari Ryman
1995 Oct 8–20 Beijing, China 16 teams	1.	Germany; Daniela von Arnim, Sabine Auken, Pony Nehmert, Andrea Rauscheid, (Karin Caesar, Marianne Mögel)*
1995 Oct 8–20 Beijing, China 16 teams	2.	(United States) USA 1 Karen McCallum, Kitty Munson, Sue Picus, Rozanne Pollack, Kerri Sanborn, Carol Simon
1995 Oct 8–20 Beijing, China 16 teams	3.	France; Véronique Bessis, Claude Blouquit, Bénédicte Cronier, Catherine D'Ovidio, Colette Lise, Sylvie Willard
1997 Oct 19–Nov 1 Hammamet, Tunisia 18 teams	1.	(United States) USA 1 Lisa Berkowitz, Mildred Breed, Marinesa Letizia, Jill Meyers, Randi Montin, Tobi Sokolow
1997 Oct 19–Nov 1 Hammamet, Tunisia 18 teams	2.	China; Gu Ling, Lu Yan, Sun Ming, Wang Wenfei, Zhang Yalan, Zhang Yu
1997 Oct 19–Nov 1 Hammamet, Tunisia 18 teams	3.	(United States) USA 2 Juanita Chambers, Lynn Deas, Irina Levitina, Beth Palmer, Kerri Sanborn, Kathie Wei
2000 January 7–21 Southampton, Bermuda 20 teams	1.	Netherlands; Jet Pasman, Anneke Simons, Martine Verbeek, Bep Vriend, Marijke van der Pas, Wietske van Zwol
2000 January 7–21 Southampton, Bermuda 20 teams	2.	(United States) USA 1 Renee Mancuso, Jill Meyers, Randi Montin, Shawn Quinn, Janice Seamon-Molson, Tobi Sokolow
2000 January 7–21 Southampton, Bermuda 20 teams	3.	Denmark; Trine Bilde Kofoed, Dorte Cilleborg, Bettina Kalkerup, Kirsten Steen Møller, (Mette Drøgemüller, Charlotte Koch-Palmund)**
2001 Oct 21–Nov 3 Paris, France 18 teams	1.	Germany; Daniela von Arnim, Sabine Auken, Pony Nehmert, Andrea Rauscheid, (Katrin Farwig, Barbara Hackett)*
2001 Oct 21–Nov 3 Paris, France 18 teams	2.	France; Véronique Bessis, Bénédicte Cronier, Catherine D'Ovidio, Sylvie Willard, (Catherine Fishpool, Elisabeth Hugon)***
2001 Oct 21–Nov 3 Paris, France 18 teams	3.	(United States) USA 2 Mildred Breed, Petra Hamman, Joan Jackson, Robin Klar, Shawn Quinn, Kay Schulle
2003 November 2–15 Monte Carlo, Monaco 18 teams	1.	(United States) USA 1 Betty Ann Kennedy, Jill Levin, Sue Picus, Janice Seamon-Molson, Tobi Sokolow, Kathie Wei-Sender
2003 November 2–15 Monte Carlo, Monaco 18 teams	2.	China; Gu Ling, Wang Hongli, Wang Liping, Wang Wenfei, Zhang Yalan, Zhang Yu
2003 November 2–15 Monte Carlo, Monaco 18 teams	3.	Netherlands; Carla Arnolds, Jet Pasman, Anneke Simons, Bep Vriend, Marijke van der Pas, Wietske van Zwol
2005 Oct 22–Nov 5 Estoril, Portugal 22 teams	1.	France; Danièle Allouche-Gaviard, Bénédicte Cronier, Catherine D'Ovidio, Sylvie Willard, (Nathalie Frey, Vanessa Reess)*
2005 Oct 22–Nov 5 Estoril, Portugal 22 teams	2.	Germany; Anja Alberti, Daniela von Arnim, Sabine Auken, Barbara Hackett, Pony Nehmert, Mirja Schraverus-Meuer
2005 Oct 22–Nov 5 Estoril, Portugal 22 teams	3.	Netherlands; Carla Arnolds, Femke Hoogweg, Jet Pasman, Anneke Simons, Bep Vriend, Wietske van Zwol
2007 Sep 29–Oct 13 Shanghai, China 22 teams	1.	(United States) USA 1 Jill Levin, Irina Levitina, Jill Meyers, Hansa Narasimhan, Debbie Rosenberg, JoAnna Stansby
2007 Sep 29–Oct 13 Shanghai, China 22 teams	2.	Germany; Anja Alberti, Daniela von Arnim, Sabine Auken, Barbara Hackett, Pony Nehmert, Mirja Schraverus-Meuer
2007 Sep 29–Oct 13 Shanghai, China 22 teams	3.	China; Gu Ling, Liu Yiqian, Sun Ming, Wang Hongli, Wang Wenfei, Zhang Yalan
2009 Aug 29–Sep 12 São Paulo, Brazil 22 teams	1.	China; Dong Yongling, Liu Yiqian, Yan Ru, Sun Ming, Wang Hongli, Wang Wenfei
2009 Aug 29–Sep 12 São Paulo, Brazil 22 teams	2.	(United States) USA 1 Lynn Baker, Lynn Deas, Irina Levitina, Karen McCallum, Beth Palmer, Kerri Sanborn
2009 Aug 29–Sep 12 São Paulo, Brazil 22 teams	3.	France; Danièle Allouche-Gaviard, Véronique Bessis, Bénédicte Cronier, Catherine D'Ovidio, Elisabeth Hugon, Sylvie Willard
2011 October 15–29 Veldhoven, Netherlands 22 teams	1.	France; Danièle Allouche-Gaviard, Véronique Bessis, Bénédicte Cronier, Catherine D'Ovidio, Joanna Neve, Sylvie Willard
2011 October 15–29 Veldhoven, Netherlands 22 teams	2.	Indonesia; Lusje Olha Bojoh, Fera Damayanti, Suci Amita Dewi, Kristina Wahyu Murniati, Liem Riantini, Julita Grace Tueje
2011 October 15–29 Veldhoven, Netherlands 22 teams	3.	Netherlands; Carla Arnolds, Laura Dekkers, Marion Michielsen, Jet Pasman, Anneke Simons, Bep Vriend
2013 September 17–29 Bali, Indonesia 22 teams	1.	(United States) USA 2 Hjördis Eythorsdottir, Jill Levin, Jill Meyers, Janice Seamon-Molson, Jenny Wolpert, Migry Zur Campanile
2013 September 17–29 Bali, Indonesia 22 teams	2.	England; Sally Brock, Fiona Brown, Heather Dhondy, Nevena Senior, Nicola Smith, Susan Stockdale
2013 September 17–29 Bali, Indonesia 22 teams	3.	Netherlands; Carla Arnolds, Marion Michielsen, Jet Pasman, Anneke Simons, Wietske van Zwol, Meike Wortel
2015 September 26 – October 10 Chennai, India 22 teams	1.	France; Deborah Campagnano, Bénédicte Cronier, Elisabeth Hugon, Vanessa Reess, Sylvie Willard, Joanna Zochowska
2015 September 26 – October 10 Chennai, India 22 teams	2.	(United States) USA 2 Juanita Chambers, Lynn Deas, Joann Glasson, Beth Palmer, Janice Seamon-Molson, Tobi Sokolow
2015 September 26 – October 10 Chennai, India 22 teams	3.	England; Sally Brock, Fiona Brown, Heather Dhondy, Catherine Draper, Nevena Senior, Nicola Smith
2017 August 12–26 Lyon, France 22 teams	1.	China; Yan Huang, Yan Liu, Yan Lu, Qi Shen, Nan Wang, Wen Fei Wang, Jianxin Wang npc, Xiaojing Wang coach
2017 August 12–26 Lyon, France 22 teams	2.	England; Sally Brock, Fiona Brown, Catherine Draper, Sandra Penfold, Nevena Senior, Nicola Smith, Derek Patterson npc, David Burn coach
2017 August 12–26 Lyon, France 22 teams	3.	Sweden; Pia Andersson, Kathrine Bertheau, Ida Grönkvist, Emma Ovelius, Cecilia Rimstedt, Sandra Rimstedt, Kenneth Borin npc, Carina Wademark coach
2019 September 14–28 Wuhan, China 24 teams	1.	Sweden; Kathrine Bertheau, Sanna Clementsson, Ida Grönkvist, Jessica Larsson, Emma Ovelius, Cecilia Rimstedt, Kenneth Borin (npc), Carina Wademark (coach).
2019 September 14–28 Wuhan, China 24 teams	2.	China; Yan Liu, Yan Lu, Qi Shen, Nan Wang, Wen Fei Wang, Xiaoxue Zuo, Xiaojing Wang (npc), Xiaojing Wang (coach)
2019 September 14–28 Wuhan, China 24 teams	3.	England; Heather Dhondy, Catherine Draper, Gillian Fawcett, Nevena Senior, Nicola Smith, Yvonne Wiseman, David Gold (npc), David Burn (coach).
2022 March 27 - April 9 Salsomaggiore Terme, Italy 24 teams	1.	Sweden; Kathrine Bertheau, Sanna Clementsson, Louise Hallqvist, Ylva Johansson, Jessica Larsson, Emma Ovelius, Tobias Törnqvist (npc), Carina Wademark (coach).
2022 March 27 - April 9 Salsomaggiore Terme, Italy 24 teams	2.	Turkey; Özlem Kandolu, Serap Kuranoğlu, Eren Özan, İrem Özbay, Hatice Özgür, Dilek Yavaş, Belis Atalay (npc), Halil Atalay (coach)
2022 March 27 - April 9 Salsomaggiore Terme, Italy 24 teams	3.	England; Sally Brock, Fiona Brown, Heather Dhondy, Catherine Draper, Gillian Fawcett, Nevena Senior, David Burn (npc)
2022 March 27 - April 9 Salsomaggiore Terme, Italy 24 teams	3.	Poland; Cathy Baldysz, Sophia Baldysz, Katarzyna Dufrat, Danuta Kazmucha, Anna Sarniak, Joanna Zaleswka, Miroslaw Cichocki (npc)
2023 August 20 - September 2 Marrakesh, Morocco 24 teams	1.	Israel; Adi Asulin, Hila Levi, Adel Petelko, Ziv Roitman, Dana Tal, Noga Tal, Israel Yadlin (npc), Ron Pachtman (coach).
2023 August 20 - September 2 Marrakesh, Morocco 24 teams	2.	Turkey; Asli Acar, Tuna Elmas, Berrak Erkan, Özlem Kandolu, İrem Özbay, Hatice Özgür, M. Gokhan Yilmaz (npc)
2023 August 20 - September 2 Marrakesh, Morocco 24 teams	3.	China; Yan Huang, Yan Liu, Jing Rong Ran, Xiuting Yu, Meiling Zhou, Xiaoxue Zuo, Yannang Wang (npc), Xin Li (coach)

* Brunner – Scott-Jones in 1985, Caesar–Mögel in 1995, Farwig–Hackett in 2001, and Frey–Reess in 2005 did not play enough boards to qualify for the title of World Champion
** Shaomin–Wang in 1991, and Drøgemüller – Koch-Palmund in 2000 did not play enough boards to qualify for third place
*** Spinn–Widengren in 1991 and Fishpool–Hugon in 2001 did not play enough boards to qualify for second place

== 2009 ==
Over 13 days in São Paulo, Brazil, beginning 30 August 2009, China became the first bridge nation outside Europe and North America to win the Venice Cup. Indeed, only China has won any gold, silver, or bronze medal in the tournament (see table, below).

The Chinese victory was decisive, culminating in a 220 to 148 IMP domination of USA1 in the two-day final match. Previously China led the seven-day 21-round-robin (France second) from which eight of 22 teams advanced to the knockout stage, then defeated Sweden 259–182 in the quarterfinal and France 245–221 in the semifinal. The 77-IMP and 72-IMP wins over Sweden and USA1 were the second and third biggest margins in the seven knockout matches.

Bénédicte Cronier–Sylvie Willard of France were the high-scoring players on all 22 teams during the round-robin, playing 15 of 21 matches and scoring 0.93 IMP per board. Hongli Wang–Ming Sun of China were second at 0.81 in 15 matches and their teammate pairs (six players on a "Team-of-four") ranked third and eighth.

== 2011 ==
France won the 2011 Venice Cup by 196 to 103 IMP in a two-day final match against Indonesia

Indonesia	0	13	24	19	_{=56}	38	9	—	103
France	0+	46	41	39	_{=126}	32	38	—	196+

France started with one-third IMP carryover from the 16-deal round-robin match, meaning Indonesia must score at least one IMP better on the 96 deals of the final. France scored consistently well during the first three segments, to lead overnight by 126+ to 56, and Indonesia conceded after two of three segments scheduled for the next day.

Notable performances

This is the second Venice Cup for France and the 7th medal in 14 Venice Cup tournaments from 1985 to date, the time of equality with the Bermuda Bowl. Silvie Willard has played for all seven medalists; Véronique Bessis, Bénédicte Cronier, and Catherine D'Ovidio (Saul) six; and Danièle Gaviard (Allouche) five. Following the tournament, D'Ovidio and Willard moved up current ranks one and two among Women Grand Masters and their three frequent teammates moved into the top twelve.

The silver medal for Indonesia represents a sudden arrival among the stronger teams, having placed during the preceding decade no better than 9th (2009), just outside the knockout stage in the current format.

Preliminary

There were 22 national teams in the field, who represented the eight WBF zones as follows. The regular quota for Europe is six teams, seven at Veldhoven because the host country qualifies automatically.

Europe: France, Netherlands, Sweden, Germany, England, Poland, Italy —ranks 1 to 7 in the European championship
North America: Canada, USA 1, USA 2
South America: Brazil, Venezuela
Asia & Middle East: India, Jordan
C. America & Carib.: Trinidad & Tobago
Pacific Asia: China, Indonesia, Japan
South Pacific: Australia, New Zealand
Africa: Egypt, Morocco

The first stage was a full round-robin scheduled in advance. (Note: Schedule of Play / Venice Cup. 2011. WBF. Given the full round-robin structure, the particular schedule should make no difference in the outcome of the first stage.) Every team played 21 short matches of 16 deals, three daily.

The women of France, Germany, and the Netherlands have been strong teams for about two decades but this year they waged a close fight for the last two slots in the knockout, Netherlands and France surviving with Germany 7 VP short. The two USA teams led the round-robin and selected quarterfinal opponents Indonesia, sixth, and Netherlands, seventh. England placed third and selected Sweden, fifth. That left defending champion China, fourth, to face France, eighth, a rematch of one 2009 semifinal.

In the quarterfinals, Indonesia and Netherlands both overcame 16-IMP carryovers (the maximum achievable head starts) to defeat the Americans by 33 and 28 IMP. England defeated Sweden to be the only preliminary leader who advanced, and France defeated China, 205+ to 197, in the only match that "went to the end". France led by 15+ after five segments and extended the lead to 29+ IMP on the 84th deal (#20), but the champions yielded nothing more and cut the margin to 2+ on the 95th deal. (The leader was known only to spectators, including local and internet commentators and presumably the third pair from each team.) Finally China defeated 3♠ one trick worth 50 points, while France doubled 4♠ and beat it two tricks, worth 300 points and a final margin of eight up from two IMP.

In the semifinals, Indonesia outscored England by 18 IMP on 96 deals to overcome 10.5 carryover. France outscored Netherlands by 21 to overcome 0.5 carryover.

While France won the Cup from Indonesia, the host Netherlands overcame 12 IMP carryover to beat England in 48 deals and win the bronze medal, 109 to 91.

So the preliminary eight, seventh, and sixth place teams had finished one, two, three on the victory stand.

== 2013 ==
USA2 won the 2013 Venice Cup in Bali, Indonesia, defeating England by a score of 229 to 220.3 IMP. The two-day final match of 96 deals was unusually close: the margin, a fraction less than 9 IMP, is frequently exceeded on a single deal; China and France had won the 2009 and 2011 Cups by more than 70 and 90 IMP.

USA2 was the second of two United States entries in the field of 22: namely, Hjordis Eythorsdottir, Jill Levin, Jill Meyers, Janice Seamon-Molson, Jenny Wolpert, Migry Zur Campanile; Sue Picus npc. England was represented by the same team that won the 2012 World Mind Sports Games: Sally Brock, Fiona Brown, Heather Dhondy, Nevena Senior, Nicola Smith, Susan Stockdale; Jeremy Dhondy npc, David Burn coach.

The Netherlands won another close match for third place, defeating China by 152 to 139. The bronze medalists: Carla Arnolds, Marion Michielsen, Jet Pasman, Anneke Simons, Wietske van Zwol, Meike Wortel; Alex van Reenen npc, Hans Kelder coach.

Jill Meyers now has four Venice Cup wins (after 1993, 1997 and 2007), Levin three (2003, 2007) and Seamon-Molson two (2003). Meyers is the first to win six world titles for women, as Nicola Smith would have been with an England victory. She has won five medals in Venice Cup tournaments, as have the Dutch women Arnolds, Pasman, and Simons.

== 2015 ==
In 2015 the Venice Cup was held in Chennai (formerly Madras), India. It was won by France, with USA2 taking silver. England beat the Netherlands in the bronze medal play-off.

== 2017 ==
In 2017 the Venice Cup was held in Lyon, France. It was won by China, with England taking silver. Sweden beat Poland in the bronze medal play-off.

== 2019 ==
In 2019 the Venice Cup was held in Wuhan, China. It was won by Sweden, with China taking silver. England beat Netherlands in the bronze medal play-off.

== 2022 ==
The tournament was scheduled for 2021 but was held in Salsomaggiore, Italy in 2022 due to the COVID-19 pandemic. It was won by Sweden, with Turkey taking silver. England and Poland shared the bronze medal.

== 2023 ==
The tournament was held in Marrakesh, Morocco, in 2023. It was won by Israel, with Turkey taking silver. China beat Norway in the bronze medal play-off.

== Medals (1974–2023) ==
Rank	Nation	Gold	Silver	Bronze	Total
1	United States (USA)	11	6	2	19
2	France (FRA)	3	2	3	8
3	China (CHN)	2	3	3	8
4	Germany (GER)	2	3	0	5
5	Great Britain (GBR)	2	1	0	3
6	Sweden (SWE)	2	0	2	4
7	Netherlands (NED)	1	1	4	6
8	Israel (ISR)	1	0	0	1
9	England (ENG)	0	2	3	5
10	Italy (ITA)	0	2	1	3
11	Turkey (TUR)	0	2	0	2
12	Austria (AUT)	0	1	0	1
12	Indonesia (INA)	0	1	0	1
14	Argentina (ARG)	0	0	1	1
14	Brazil (BRA)	0	0	1	1
14	Canada (CAN)	0	0	1	1
14	Denmark (DEN)	0	0	1	1
14	Poland (POL)	0	0	1	1
Totals (18 entries)		24	24	23	71

== Hosts ==
- 1974 Venice, Italy
- 1976 Monte Carlo, Monaco
- 1978 New Orleans, United States
- 1981 New York, United States
- 1985 São Paulo, Brazil
- 1987 Ocho Ríos, Jamaica
- 1989 Perth, Australia
- 1991 Yokohama, Japan
- 1993 Santiago, Chile
- 1995 Beijing, China
- 1997 Hammamet, Tunisia
- 2000 Southampton, Bermuda
- 2001 Paris, France
- 2003 Monte Carlo, Monaco
- 2005 Estoril, Portugal
- 2007 Shanghai, China
- 2009 São Paulo, Brazil
- 2011 Veldhoven, Netherlands
- 2013 Bali, Indonesia
- 2015 Chennai, India
- 2017 Lyon, France
- 2019 Wuhan, China
- 2022 Salsomaggiore, Italy
- 2023 Marrakesh, Morocco

== Zones and nations ==
See the version at "Senior Bowl".

== See also ==
- World Team Olympiad
- 2021 World Bridge Team Championships
