= Paul Chemla =

Paul Chemla (January 2, 1944 – September 30, 2025) was a famous French bridge player.

Chemla was born in Tunis. He studied at the École Normale Supérieure in Paris where he took up playing bridge. His wins include three European Pairs Championships (1976 with Michel Lebel, 1985 with Michel Perron, and 1999 with Alain Lévy), two World Team Olympiads (1980 and 1992), and the 1997 Bermuda Bowl. Chemla is noted for his girth and his large cigars.

== Bridge accomplishments ==
=== Awards ===
- IBPA Personality of the Year 1998

=== Wins ===
- Bermuda Bowl (1) 1997
- World Open Team Olympiad (2) 1980, 1992
- Transnational Mixed Teams (1) 2004
- European Championships (6)
  - Open Pairs (3) 1976, 1985, 1999
  - Mixed Teams (3) 1990, 1996, 1998
- Other notable wins:
  - Forbo-Krommenie Nations Cup (1) 1998
  - Yeh Bros Cup Open Teams (1) 2006
  - Sunday Times Invitational Pairs (1) 1991
  - Generali World Masters Individual (1) 1998

=== Runners-up ===
- World Team Olympiad (1) 1984
- Transnational Mixed Teams (1) 2000
- European Open Bridge Championships (1)
  - Open Teams (1) 2003
- European Championships (3)
  - Open Teams (1) 1995
  - Mixed Pairs (1) 1998
  - Senior Teams (1) 1999
- Other notable 2nd places:
  - Staten Bank World Top Invitational Pairs (1) 1988
  - Cavendish Invitational Pairs (1) 1982
