= Bep Vriend =

Dutch bridge player (born 1946)

Brechiena "Bep" Vriend (born 1946) is a Dutch bridge player and teacher. She ranked number 8 among Women World Grand Masters as of April 2011 and number 20 among 69 WGM as of June 2014.

Vriend was European Bridge League Women Pairs champion 1980, 1993 and 2007, European Women Teams champion in 2007, World Champion Women Pairs 1994, and World Champion Women Teams (Venice Cup) 2000.

Vriend was born in Andijk, North Holland, about 60 km (37 mi) north of Amsterdam, where she learned bridge as a student. There she also met her husband, Anton Maas, another international bridge player and sometime coach of the Dutch open team. Playing together they have won EBL championships in Mixed Teams and Mixed Pairs.

Vriend first played on the Dutch team in European Bridge League championships in 1974. For years including the 1994 World Women Pairs she played with Carla Arnold. From 1994 to 2003 including the 2000 Venice Cup championship her partner was Marijke van der Pas.

Vriend is a bridge teacher; she and Maas live in Amstelveen (2011 or later) – a suburb of Amsterdam.
