= World Bridge Games =

Contract bridge competition event

The World Bridge Games are held quadrennially. The first two events were held in 2008 and 2012, in Beijing and Lille respectively, as part of the World Mind Sports Games (WMSG), and superseding the World Team Olympiad, which had been held every four years from 1960 to 2004. More than half of the 2008 WMSG participants were bridge players. For 2016, the bridge competitions within the WMSG were hived off as a separate event, held during September that year in Wrocław, Poland. The most recent iteration of the Games was held in Buenos Aires, Argentina, in October-November 2024.

== Results - open ==
Year	Location	Winner	Gold medalists
2008	Beijing, China	Italy	Giorgio Duboin, Fulvio Fantoni, Lorenzo Lauria, Claudio Nunes, Antonio Sementa Alfredo Versace, Massimo Ortensi (coach), Maria Teresa Lavazza (npc)
2012	Lille, France	Sweden	Krister Ahlevesad, Peter Bertheau, Per-Ola Cullin, Fredrik Nystrom, Joas Petersson, Johan Upmark, Jan Lagerman (coach), Mats Axdorph (npc)
2016	Wrocław, Poland	Netherlands	Sjoert Brink, Simon De Wijs, Bas Drijver, Bob Drijver, Bauke Muller, Bart Nab, NPC: Anton Maas, Ton Bakkeren (coach)
2024	Buenos Aires, Argentina	Poland	Krzysztof Buras, Wojciech Gaweł, Rafał Jagniewski, Przemysław Janiszewski, Kamil Nowak, Wojciech Strzemecki, Marek Pietraszek (captain)
