= World Bridge Championships =

International championship for contract bridge

The World Bridge Championships consists of several sets of championships organized under the auspices of the World Bridge Federation.

== World Bridge Series Championships ==
World Bridge Series Championships is the new 2010 name for a quadrennial meet organized by the World Bridge Federation in non-leap even years. (Another meet, the World Bridge Games, is held quadrennially in leap years.) Most of its world championship events are open in the sense that entries do not represent geographic zones or nations.

The meet was inaugurated in 1962 as the World Pair Olympiad comprising the World Open Pairs Championship and World Women Pairs Championship, as well as the World Mixed Teams Championship. For the second rendition in 1966 the mixed event was for pairs, the World Mixed Pairs Championship, as it would be thereafter except in 1974.

The World Knockout Teams for the Rosenblum Cup was inaugurated in 1978 and soon became the most prestigious event of the meet. A parallel knockout teams for women was added in 1994, for the McConnell Cup. Seniors competition debuted in 1990 with the World Senior Pairs Championship and the World Senior Teams Championship followed in 1994.

The "World Bridge Series" or "World Series" for short comprises championship tournaments for both pairs and teams in open, women's, seniors, and mixed categories. Other events are irregular. All events in the World Bridge Series are open without regard to nationality. Pairs or teams may be transnational and there are no limits on the numbers who enter.

=== Venues of past events ===
- 1962 Cannes, France
- 1966 Amsterdam, Netherlands
- 1970 Stockholm, Sweden
- 1974 Las Palmas, Spain
- 1978 New Orleans, Louisiana, United States
- 1982 Biarritz, France
- 1986 Miami Beach, Florida, United States
- 1990 Geneva, Switzerland
- 1994 Albuquerque, New Mexico, United States
- 1998 Lille, France
- 2002 Montreal, Canada
- 2006 Verona, Italy
- 2010 Philadelphia, United States
- 2014 Sanya, Hainan, China
- 2018 Orlando, United States
- 2021 World Bridge Team Championships

=== America vs Europe ===
These were most prestigious Bridge competitions in the World between 1950 and 1960. This was a country vs country qualification within the entire New World and within Europe. With some initial exceptions, the winners of these qualifications then met in a final. The United States won all American qualifications, whilst Europe was represented by Italy, England, France and Sweden. The final venue alternated between the continents.

- 1950 Bermuda - USA defeated England and a Swedish-Icelandic combination
- 1951 Naples, Italy - USA defeated Italy
- 1953 New York City, USA - USA defeated Sweden
- 1954 Monte Carlo, Monaco/France - USA defeated France
- 1955 New York City, USA - England defeated USA
- 1956 Paris, France - France defeated USA
- 1957 New York City, USA - Italy defeated USA
- 1958 Como, Italy - Italy defeated USA
- 1959 New York City, USA - Italy defeated USA

There was no contest of this kind in 1952. Summary - USA 4 titles, Italy 3 titles, England 1 title and France 1 title.

== World Bridge Team Championships ==
World Bridge Team Championships is a new name for the biennial meet organized by the World Bridge Federation in odd years. There are three main events, the World Team Championships for national teams in three flights: Open, Women, and Seniors. Those are commonly called Bermuda Bowl, Venice Cup, and d'Orsi Senior Bowl after the trophies awarded to the winners.

Initiated by the British former international player Norman Bach, the Bermuda Bowl was first contested in 1950 in Hamilton, Bermuda; the Venice Cup and the Senior Bowl were integrated as part of the championships in 1974 (in Venice, Italy) and 2000 (in Southampton, Bermuda) respectively. The Senior Bowl, subsequently named the d'Orsi Senior Bowl, has been one of three concurrent World Team Championships throughout its history but the Venice Cup was originally contested less frequently than the Bermuda Bowl and it was once contested alone in a different year (1978). The Bermuda Bowl and Venice Cup have always run concurrently since 1985.

In addition to the foregoing, the World Transnational Open Teams Championship is contested during the late stages of the main events. This competition is open to players of all categories who may form teams without nationality restrictions except that players on the twelve teams that reach the semifinals in the three main flights (ordinarily 72 players) are not eligible.
