= Daniela von Arnim =

German bridge player

Daniela von Arnim (born 10 July 1964 in Munich) is a German bridge player. Sometime prior to the 2014 European and World meets (summer and October), she ranked 35th among 73 Women World Grand Masters by world masterpoints (MP) and 13th by placing points that do not decay over time. (Her longtime partner Sabine Auken played Open and Mixed events with Roy Welland in 2014, rather than enter Women events.)

Arnim, or Von Arnim, is a 3-time world champion winning the Venice Cup in 1995 and 2001 and the Mixed Teams at the World Bridge Series in 2022.

== Bridge accomplishments ==
=== Wins ===
- Venice Cup (2) 1995, 2001
- North American Bridge Championships (8)
  - Machlin Women's Swiss Teams (2) 1990, 2011
  - Wagar Women's Knockout Teams (3) 2005, 2007, 2011
  - Sternberg Women's Board-a-Match Teams (3) 2005, 2009, 2010

=== Runners-up ===
- Venice Cup (3) 1993, 2005, 2007
- World Women Pairs Championship (1) 1998
- Buffett Cup (1) 2006
- North American Bridge Championships (3)
  - Blue Ribbon Pairs (1) 2005
  - Sternberg Women's Board-a-Match Teams (1) 2002
  - Chicago Mixed Board-a-Match (1) 2006
