= Mikael Rimstedt =

Swedish contract bridge player

Mikael Rimstedt is a Swedish contract bridge player. Mikael is a World Champion. Playing with his twin brother Ola Rimstedt, they won the World Open Pairs in Orlando in 2018.

== Bridge accomplishments ==
=== Wins ===
- World Youngsters Team Championship (1) 2014
- World Open Pairs (1) 2018
