= Sandra Landy =

English contract bridge player

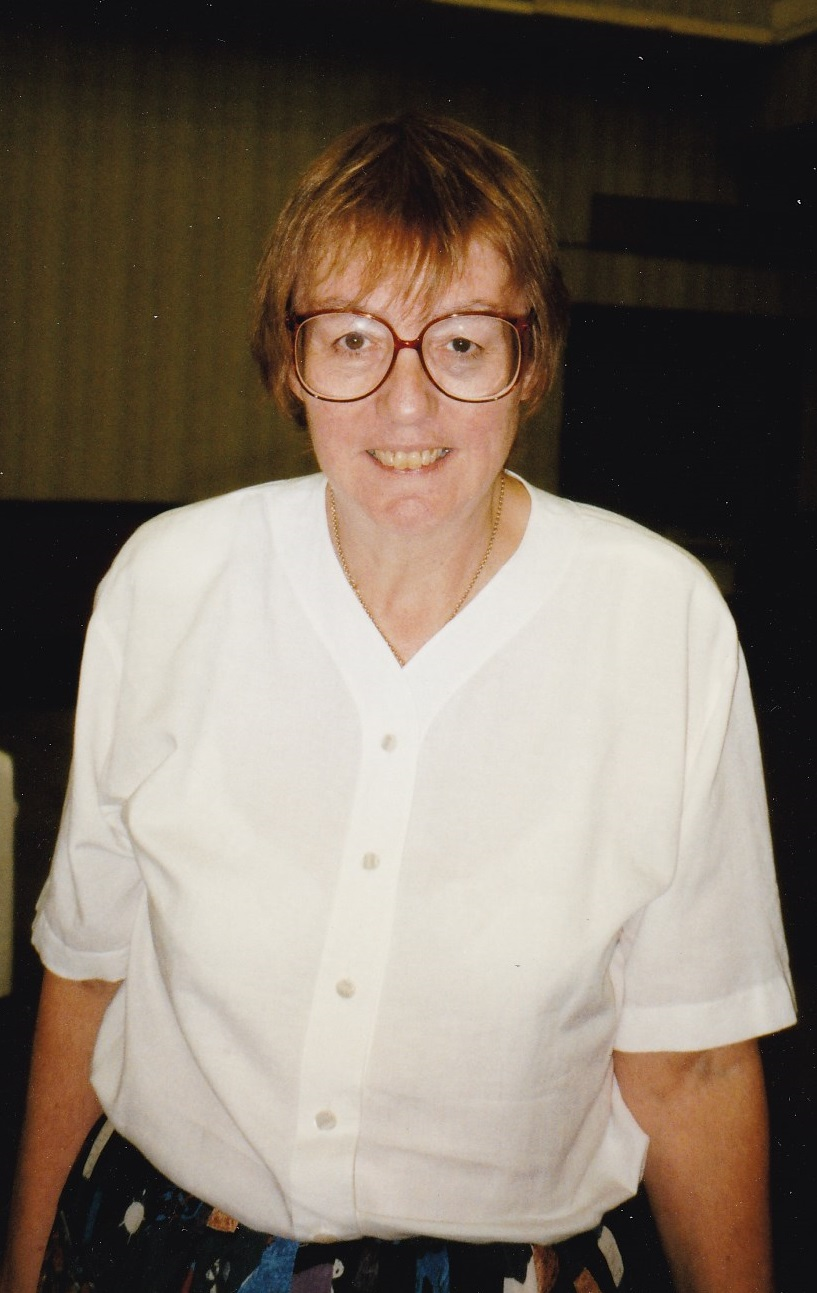
- Born: Sandra Ogilvie; 19 June 1938; Shirley, London, England, UK
- Died: 4 January 2017 (aged 78)
- Occupations: bridge player and teacher and computer scientist
- Known for: Venice Cup winner 1981 and 1985

Sandra Landy (née Ogilvie; 19 June 1938 – 4 January 2017) was a contract bridge player who played at international level for England and for Great Britain, and was a member of the England teams which won the women's world championship, the Venice Cup, in 1981 and 1985. She was also a teacher and populariser of the game, and developed the English Bridge Union's "Bridge for All" teaching programme.

== Biography ==
Sandra Ogilvie was born in the London suburb of Shirley, near Croydon. The family moved to Brighton during World War II to escape the German bombing. Her parents played bridge, and she taught herself to play the game as a child. Her mother died when she was seventeen, and she became her father's bridge partner.

She was educated at Hove County Grammar School for Girls, and then went on to study mathematics at St. Anne's College, Oxford, where she was the first woman to play in the Varsity Match (bridge) against Cambridge University. She next took a postgraduate diploma in numerical analysis and automatic computing at New Hall, Cambridge, where she met the mathematician Peter Swinnerton-Dyer (an international bridge player in the 1950s).

While at Cambridge, she won a second half blue: this time for playing bridge in the Varsity Match against Oxford.

In 1967 she married Peter Landy, who died in 2005. They had a son and a daughter.

She taught computer science at Brighton University. She took early retirement to devote all her time to bridge administration and teaching, and to playing the game. At the university, she headed the Information Systems Division. She was one of six coauthors of a retrospective article entitled Fifty Not Out, marking fifty years since the first British students started studying for degrees in computer science, which appeared in the Summer 2015 issue of the computer science journal ITNOW.

She was a member of the English Bridge Union's (EBU's) Board of Directors from 1989 to 1996, and served on the Selection Committee for many years. She was responsible for developing the EBU's "Bridge for All" teaching programme. As part of this, she developed an Acol-based bidding system called "Standard English", intended to be easy for beginners to learn, and wrote a number of books in the "Really Easy Bridge" series (see Bibliography). She was the non-playing captain of the Great Britain Open Team which won the 1991 European Championship. She received the EBU's Diamond Award in 2016.

In her opinion, the difference in aggressiveness between men's and women's bridge (the latter being more passive) might be related to testosterone levels.

In England at least, she was known for the "Landy Game Try" - not a convention, but an axiom - "First you bid game - then, you try to make it."

On retiring from her work with the EBU, she moved back to the Hove area, where she became a parish councillor in her local village and edited the village newsletter. In 2004 the newsletter won the National Association of Local Councils (NALC) Council Newsletter of the Year award, which she said was as exciting as winning a world championship.

In 2014, she was one of eight people who were recognised for their contribution to communities in Brighton and Hove in the second Older People's Day Awards. She was recognised for her work in her past professional life and remained widely admired for her pioneering work. When presenting her award, the Mayor of Brighton and Hove said: “Sandra Landy has shown great courage in her fight with dementia. Most courageous is her ability to speak about her condition to others. She is admired due to her immense knowledge as a pioneer of computers at Brighton University and her determination to keep active memory loss. She is inspiring to all those around her." She had been working with the Trust for Developing Communities to design a dementia toolkit to improve the lives of those suffering from the condition, and gave regular talks to medical students and professionals on her experiences. She joked: “I haven’t a clue what I’ve done to get this award but I clearly deserve it.”

== Death ==
Sandra Landy died on 4 January 2017, aged 78. The cause of her death was meningitis. According to her Telegraph obituarist: "A woman of great charm, Sandra Landy was a quiet ambassador for the game of bridge", who was "congenial and convivial".

== Accomplishments ==
At international level, her accomplishments include:

- 1976 - England - Venice Cup, Monte Carlo - 2nd
- 1976 - England - World Women Team Olympiad, Monte Carlo - 2nd
- 1980 - England - World Women Team Olympiad, Valkenburg - 3rd
- 1981 - England - Venice Cup, New York - Winner
- 1982 - England - World Championship Women Pairs, Biarritz - 3rd
- 1984 - England - World Women Team Olympiad, Seattle - 2nd
- 1985 - England - Venice Cup, São Paulo - Winner
- 1986 - England - World Championship Women Pairs, Miami Beach - 3rd
- 1988 - Great Britain - World Women Team Olympiad, Venice - 2nd
- 1990 - England - World Championship Mixed Pairs, Geneva - 13th
- 1995 - England - Venice Cup, Beijing - 2nd
- 1997 - England - Venice Cup, Tunisia - 5th
- 2000 - England - Venice Cup, Bermuda - 11th

In all, she represented England or Great Britain in 11 World and 16 European Championships, winning seven gold, eight silver and five bronze medals. She was the world's highest ranked female player from 1992 to 1996 and from 1999 to 2000. Her most famous partnership in international events was with Sally Brock.

She represented England 11 times in the Lady Milne Trophy, and twice in the Camrose Trophy, and won most of the EBU's domestic competitions. This included the Gold Cup in 1984.

== Bibliography ==
- Landy, Sandra (1999). Really Easy Play in No Trumps. Really Easy Bridge. - a second edition was published in 2002
- Landy, Sandra (1999). Really Easy Practice 1. Really Easy Bridge.
- Landy, Sandra (2000). Really Easy Practice 2: Bridge for All. Really Easy Bridge.
- Landy, Sandra (2000). Really Easy Mistakes. Really Easy Bridge: Standard English foundation level.
- Landy, Sandra (2001). Really Easy Bidding - "by Bridge for All and Sandra Landy". Really Easy Bridge: Standard English foundation level.
- Landy, Sandra (2001). Really Easy Play with Trumps. Really Easy Bridge.
- Landy, Sandra; Pain, J. (2001). Really Easy Defence. Really Easy Bridge.
- Landy, Sandra (2003). Really Easy Modern Acol. Really Easy Bridge.
- Landy, Sandra (2003). Really Easy Competitive Bidding. Really Easy Bridge.
- Landy, Sandra (2004). Really Easy Slams. Really Easy Bridge.
- Landy, Sandra (2005). Practice Beginning Bridge: The Complete Learn & Play Programme from the English Bridge Union. Really Easy Bridge.
- Landy, Sandra; Horton, Mark; Seagram, Barbara (2006). 25 Bridge Conventions for Acol Players.
