= World Women Pairs Championship =

Bridge championship

The World Women Pairs Championship is a bridge championship held every four years as part of the World Bridge Championships. It is restricted to women pairs only.

== Results ==
World meets commonly run for 15 days on a schedule whose details vary.

In 2006 the Women Pairs played Saturday to Friday, the 8th to 14th days of the meet, with five qualifying sessions, five semifinal sessions, and four final sessions. At the start of qualifying, sixteen teams remained in the knockout stage of the marquee teams competition for women, for the McConnell Cup. During qualifying sessions for the pairs, the McConnell teams were reduced from sixteen to four, and players from the twelve "knocked out" teams were eligible to enter pairs competition at the semifinal stage. There were 109 pairs in the qualifier, 63 in the semifinal, and 36 in the final.

United States pairs have won ten of 14 tournaments through 2014, Great Britain two, Netherlands one, China one. Fritzi Gordon and Rixi Markus of Great Britain (native Austrians) are the only two-time champion pair; Americans Karen McCallum and Kerri Sanborn/Shuman also have two wins each including one as partners in 1990. Sanborn is also the only winner of two gold medals in the World Mixed Pairs Championship, which is contested at the same quadrennial meet.

Year, Site	Entries		Medalists	
1962 Cannes, France		1.	(United Kingdom) Fritzi Gordon	(United Kingdom) Rixi Markus
1962 Cannes, France		2.	(France) Fanny Parienté	(France) Marianne Serf
1962 Cannes, France	(Note: The WBF currently lists only the winners and runners up, neither third place nor the size of the field.)	3.	(United States) Dorothy Hayden	(United States) Helen Portugal
1966 Amsterdam, Netherlands		1.	(United Kingdom) Joan Durran	(United Kingdom) Jane Juan
1966 Amsterdam, Netherlands		2.	(United States) Nancy Gruver	(United States) Sue Sachs
1966 Amsterdam, Netherlands		3.	(United States) Mary Jane Farell	(United States) Peggy Solomon
1970 Stockholm, Sweden		1.	(United States) Mary Jane Farell	(United States) Marilyn Johnson
1970 Stockholm, Sweden		2.	(United Kingdom) Fritzi Gordon	(United Kingdom) Rixi Markus
1970 Stockholm, Sweden		3.	(Sweden) Britt Blom	(Sweden) Gunborg Silborn
1974 Las Palmas, Spain	(Note: For 1974 to 1998 the WBF currently lists at least three leaders (3 in 1974; 36 in 1998) without the size of the field. Some of those listings may enumerate the finalists.)	1.	(United Kingdom) Fritzi Gordon	(United Kingdom) Rixi Markus
1974 Las Palmas, Spain		2.	(South Africa) Gerda Goslar	(South Africa) Rita Jacobson
1974 Las Palmas, Spain		3.	(United States) Emma Jean Hawes	(United States) Dorothy Hayden Truscott
1978 New Orleans, USA		1.	(United States) Judi Radin	(United States) Kathie Wei
1978 New Orleans, USA		2.	(United States) Betty Ann Kennedy	(United States) Carol Sanders
1978 New Orleans, USA		3.	(France) Claude Blouquit	(France) Élisabeth Delor
After 1980 it was determined that the world championships in even years would continue to be played in Europe and North America.
1982 Biarritz, France		1.	(United States) Betty Ann Kennedy	(United States) Carol Sanders
1982 Biarritz, France		2.	(United States) Lynn Deas	(United States) Beth Palmer
1982 Biarritz, France		3.	(United Kingdom) Sally Horton	(United Kingdom) Sandra Landy
1986 Miami Beach, USA		1.	(United States) Amalya Kearse	(United States) Jacqui Mitchell
1986 Miami Beach, USA		2.	(Denmark) Bettina Kalkerup	(Denmark) Charlotte Palmund
1986 Miami Beach, USA		3.	(United Kingdom) Sally Horton	(United Kingdom) Sandra Landy
1990 Geneva, Switzerland		1.	(United States) Karen McCallum	(United States) Kerri Shuman
1990 Geneva, Switzerland		2.	(United States) Judi Radin	(United States) Kathie Wei
1990 Geneva, Switzerland		3.	(Netherlands) Carla Arnolds	(Netherlands) Bep Vriend
1994 Albuquerque, USA		1.	(Netherlands) Carla Arnolds	(Netherlands) Bep Vriend
1994 Albuquerque, USA		2.	(France) Véronique Bessis	(France) Catherine Saul
1994 Albuquerque, USA		3.	(United States) Lynn Deas	(United States) Beth Palmer
1998 Lille, France		1.	(United States) Jill Meyers	(United States) Shawn Quinn
1998 Lille, France		2.	(Germany) Daniela von Arnim	(Germany) Sabine Auken
1998 Lille, France		3.	(France) Véronique Bessis	(France) Catherine D'Ovidio
2002 Montreal, Canada	97	1.	(United States) Karen McCallum	(United States) Debbie Rosenberg
2002 Montreal, Canada		2.	(France) Blandine de Hérédia	(France) Anne-Frédérique Lévy
2002 Montreal, Canada		3.	(United States) Irina Levitina	(United States) Kerri Sanborn
2006 Verona, Italy	109	1.	(United States) Irina Levitina	(United States) Kerri Sanborn
2006 Verona, Italy		2.	(China) WANG Hongli	(China) WANG Wenfei
2006 Verona, Italy		3.	(Germany) Sabine Auken	(United States) Janice Seamon-Molson
2010 Philadelphia, USA	81	1.	(United States) Lynn Deas	(United States) Beth Palmer
2010 Philadelphia, USA		2.	(Canada) Susan Culham	(Canada) Kismet Fung
2010 Philadelphia, USA		3.	(Netherlands) Carla Arnolds	(Netherlands) Bep Vriend
2014 Sanya, China	46 (Note: There were 46 initial entries in 2014, excluding drop-ins from the teams.)	1.	(China) Liu Shu	(China) Zhou Tao
2014 Sanya, China		2.	(China) Huang Yen	(China) Gan Lin
2014 Sanya, China		3.	(Indonesia) Suci Amita Dewi	(Indonesia) Kristina Wahyo Murniati
2018 Orlando, USA	51	1.	(France) Veronique Bessis	(France) Anne-Laure Huberschwiller
2018 Orlando, USA		2.	(United States) Kathy Sulgrove	(United States) Candace Griffey
2018 Orlando, USA		3.	(China) Yan Huang	(China) Nan Wang

== See also ==
- World Mixed Pairs Championship
- World Open Pairs Championship
