= Sternberg Women's Board-a-Match Teams =

Bridge championship

The Sternberg Women's Board-a-Match Teams bridge championship is held at the fall American Contract Bridge League (ACBL) North American Bridge Championship (NABC) and is a four session board-a-match event, two qualifying sessions and two final sessions. The event typically starts on the first Sunday of the NABC and is restricted to female players.

== History ==
The event was introduced in 1933 and was originally held at the winter NABC (there were only two NABCs - summer and winter). The original trophy was donated by George Coffin. In 1963, it was moved to the spring NABC. In 1976, the board-a-match format was changed to a knock-out format. The board-a-match format was re-introduced in 1986. The event is now held at the fall NABCs.

Dr. Jim Sternberg donated the current trophy in 2001 in memory of his wife, Marsha May Sternberg, who died in 2001 after a six-week battle with cancer.

== Winners ==
Five champion teams defended their titles without any change in team personnel, on seven occasions: 1936, 1944–1946, 1961, 1975, and 2010. The four-time winners from 1943 to 1946 were Emily Folline, Helen Sobel, Margaret Wagar, Sally Young. Folline and Sobel had been runners-up in 1942; Sobel also in 1941.

The 1974–75 champions were the last for the board-a-match tournament as the premier championship for women teams. They won the premier championship again in 1976, its first under knockout conditions. (See Wagar Women's Knockout Teams, for the Wagar Trophy that is named for one of the four-time board-a-match winners.)

Women's Board-a-Match Teams, 1933 to present
Year	Winners	Runners-up
1933	Mrs. Greene Fenley Jr., Mrs. Richard Field, Mrs. John W. Friedlander, Jane Wallace	Mollie Funk, Ethel Gardner, Marguerite Hoffmeier, Marie White
1934	Gail Hamilton, Marguerite Hoffmeier, Helen Pendelton Rockwell, Anne Rosenfeld	Elizabeth Banfield, Phyllis Gardner, Eva Gross, Dorothy Roberts
1935	Doris Fuller, Angela Quigley, Florence Stratford, Helen White	Gail Hamilton, Marguerite Hoffmeier, Helen Pendelton Rockwell, Anne Rosenfeld
1936	Doris Fuller, Angela Quigley, Florence Stratford, Helen White	Marge Anderson, Mrs. J. A. Faulkner, Marjorie Haldeman, Mrs. G. Keedick
1937	Martha Lemon, Mrs. A. Philip Stockvis, Mrs. Martin West, Sally Young	Doris Fuller, Angela Quigley, Helen Sobel, Florence Stratford
1938	Mrs. Galloway Morris, Lillian Peck, Olive Peterson, Mrs. Donald B. Tansill	Mariquita Fullerton, Mollie Funk, Ann Rosenfeld, Lucille Schwarz
1939	Mable Ervin, Doris Fuller, Helen Mitchell, Helen Sobel, Sally Young	Sylvia DeYoung, Margaret Katzen, Catherine W. Samberg, Florence Stratford
1940	Helen Levy, Adelaide Neuwirth, Margaret Wagar, Lottie Zetosch	Ruth Horn, Olga Hilliard, Marguerite McKenney, Gussie Planco
1941	Inez Buchannan, Mae Dickens, Mabel Scott, Linda Terry	Doris Fuller, Mrs. Joseph M. Rothschild, Helen Sobel, Sally Young
1942	Peggy Golder, Olga Hilliard, Olive Peterson, Ruth Sherman	Emily Folline, Doris Fuller, Ethel Gardner, Helen Sobel
1943	Emily Folline, Helen Sobel, Margaret Wagar, Sally Young	Eleanor Hirsch, Evelyn Lebhar, Marguerite McKenney, Florence Stratford
1944	Emily Folline, Helen Sobel, Margaret Wagar, Sally Young	Mrs. M. Godfrey, Mrs. C. W. Neeld, Dorothy Sullivan, Anne H. Todd
1945	Emily Folline, Helen Sobel, Margaret Wagar, Sally Young	Josephine Gutman, Gratian Goldstein, Marjorie Perlmutter, Gretchen Schildmiller
1946	Emily Folline, Helen Sobel, Margaret Wagar, Sally Young	Paula Bacher, Marie Basher, Jane Jaeger, Pauline Schmuckler
1947	1/2. Marge Anderson, Ruby Lyons, Mimi Roncarelli, Jane Wallace; 1/2. Cass Illig, Frances Robinson, Alma Stewart, Carolyn Sondheim	
1948	Ruth Gordon, Gratian Goldstein, Josephine Gutman, Charlotte Sidway	Ruth Gilbert, Olive Peterson, Edith Seligman, Ruth Sherman, Peggy Solomon
1949	1/2. Hortense Evans, Frances Robinson, Mrs. Henry Sabatt, Carolyn Sondheim; 1/2. Marianne Boschan, Catherine Cotter, Gertrude Eberson, Katherine McNutt	
1950	Marge Anderson, Mary Bowden, Ruth Gordon, G. Eloise Neil	2/5. Olive Peterson, Ruth Sherman, Helen Sobel, Margaret Wagar; 2/5. Shirley Fairchild, Mrs. Ezra Feldman, Rose Groves, Luise Mathews, Claire Meyer; 2/5. Margaret Byrd, Isabelle Garn, Virginia Ploehn, Billy Traveletti; 2/5. Inez Buchanan, Zodie Glover, Sally Herman, Mabel Scott
1951	Paula Bacher, Anne Burnstein, Dolly Rosenfeld, Edith Seligman, Sally Young	Thelma Hathorn, Mollie Steiner, Agatha Tiernan, Clara Tiernan, Mary Elizabeth Tiernan
1952	Jackie Begin, Sally Herman, Jessie S. Moore, Norma Matz	2/3. Peggy Adams, Helen Baker, Marguerite Harris, Ethel Keohane; 2/3. Kay Rhodes, Ruth Sherman, Helen Sobel, Margaret Wagar
1953	Gretchen Feldstein, Vera Glick, Gratian Goldstein, Lucille Schwarz	2/3. Mary Jane Kauder, Kay Rhodes, Ruth Sherman, Margaret Wagar; 2/3. Elaine Lee, Olive Peterson, Roberta Sheronas, Peggy Solomon
1954	Wynne Ecker, Doris Fuller, Marguerite Harris, Norma Matz	2/5. Marguerite Bouldin, Lillian Hassler, Ann Jervis, Dorothy Payne; 2/5. Marie Cohn, Olive Peterson, Pauline Schmuckler, Peggy Solomon; 2/5. Kay Rhodes, Ruth Sherman, Helen Sobel, Margaret Wagar; 2/5. Margaret Alcorn, Louise Eisenman, Emily Folline, Sue Reith
1955	Peggy Adams, Carlyn Brall, Louise Eisenman, Shirley Johnson, Juanita Strich	2/4. Kay Rhodes, Ruth Sherman, Helen Sobel, Margaret Wagar; 2/4. Anne Burnstein, Edith Kemp, Paula Levin, Ruth Steinberg, Sally Young; 2/4. Ruth Gordon, Josephine Gutman, Evelyn Engleman, Margaret Katzen, G. Eloise Neil
1956	Peggy Rotzell, Jan Stone, Charlotte Sidway, Mary Elizabeth Tiernan	Kay Rhodes, Helen Sobel, Margaret Wagar, Sally Young
1957	Marie Cohn, Mary Jane Kauder, Stella Rebner, Peggy Solomon	Agnes Gordon, Kay Rhodes, Helen Sobel, Margaret Wagar
1958	Carlyn Brall, Bee Gale, Sally Johnson, Peggy Rotzell	Kay Rhodes, Helen Sobel, Margaret Wagar, Sally Young
1959	Margaret Alcorn, Lee Kasle, Josephine Sharp, Adaline Simon, Garner McDaniel	Kay Dunn, Jane Herb, Malvine Klausner, Helen Portugal, Rose Reif
1960	Roberta Erde, Sally Johnson, Barbara Kachmar, Bee Schenken	Joan Remey, Helen Shanbrom, Sylvia Stein, Marge Stone
1961	Roberta Erde, Sally Johnson, Barbara Kachmar, Bee Schenken	Mary Jane Farell, Terry Michaels, Peggy Solomon, Jan Stone
1962	Anne Burnstein, Edith Kemp, Alicia Kempner, Stella Rebner, Teddie Warner	Muriel Kaplan, Terry Michaels, Garner McDaniel, Jan Stone
1963	Pat Adler, Terry Michaels, Garner McDaniel, Carol Sanders, Sylvia Stein	Dorothy Hayden, Barbara Kachmar, Agnes Gordon, Helen Portugal, Margaret Wagar
1964	Hermine Baron, Mary Jane Farell, Peggy Solomon, Bee Schenken	Agnes Gordon, Dorothy Hayden, Helen Portugal, Margaret Wagar
1965	Virginia Heckel, Betty Kaplan, Edith Kemp, Jacqui Mitchell	Debbie Polak, Joan Remey, Carol Ruther, Sylvia Stein
1966	1/2. Freida Arst, June Deutsch, Sylvia Stein, Carol Stoklin; 1/2. Nancy Gruver, Garner McDaniel, Terry Michaels, Sue Sachs	
1967	Dorothy Hayden, Emma Jean Hawes, Agnes Gordon, Margaret Wagar	2/3. Hermine Baron, Mary Jane Farell, Bee Schenken, Peggy Solomon; 2/3. Dolores Bick, Jude Ballard, Ruth Needham, Viola Kirkwood
1968	Hermine Baron, Mary Jane Farell, Sally Johnson, Bee Schenken, Peggy Solomon, Rhoda Walsh	Jean Frankel, Teddy O.Brien, Mary Beth Townsend, Esta Van Zandt
1969	Karen Allison, Virginia Heckel, Edith Kemp, Alicia Kempner, Helen Portugal, Jan Stone	Nancy Gruver, Barbara Rappaport, Sue Sachs, Barbara Tepper
1970	Mary Jane Farell, Emma Jean Hawes, Dorothy Hayden, Marilyn Johnson, Jacqui Mitchell, Peggy Solomon	Dorothy Cowger, Diane Hawes, Florence Van Winkle, Freda Van Cleve
1971	Judi Friedenberg, Gail Moss, Marietta Passell, Helen Utegaard, Kathie Wei	Roberta Epstein, Gretchen Goldstein, Edith Kemp, Barbara Rappaport, Sylvia Stein
1972	Mary Jane Farell, Emma Jean Hawes, Dorothy Hayden, Sue Picus	Frieda Arst, June Deutsch, Eunice Rosen, Carol Stoklin
1973	Nancy Gruver, Terry Michaels, Jo Morse, Helen Utegaard	2/4. Nancy Alpaugh, Fran Beard, Heitie Noland, Betsey Wolff, Esta Van Zandt; 2/4. Mary Jane Farell, Marilyn Johnson, Jacqui Mitchell, Gail Moss, Marietta Passell, Kathie Wei; 2/4. Jean Christopher, Muriel Peterson, Beverly Rosenberg, Elaine Sternberg
1974	Mary Jane Farell, Emma Jean Hawes, Marilyn Johnson, Jacqui Mitchell, Gail Moss, Dorothy Truscott	Hermine Baron, Carol Greenhut, Trudi Nugit, Kerri Shuman
1975	Mary Jane Farell, Emma Jean Hawes, Marilyn Johnson, Jacqui Mitchell, Gail Moss, Dorothy Truscott	Anita Davis, Mildred Freedman, Robin Grantham, Carol Klar
After 1975 the premier event for women teams was changed from board-a-match to knockout format, as the Wagar Women's Knockout Teams—and the 1974–75 champions won again in 1976. After ten years a board-a-match for women was restored. (The parallel board-a-match for men continued without break until its conversion to open in 1990. See Mitchell Board-a-Match Teams.)
1986	Lisa Berkowitz, Dorothy Truscott, Joyce Lilie, Jan Martel	2/4. Eunice Portnoy, Halina Jamner, Genevieve Geiger, Madelynn Treitel; 2/4. Kathie Wei, Judi Radin, Jacqui Mitchell, Gail Greenberg, Carol Sanders, Betty Ann Kennedy; 2/4. Rozanne Pollack, Roberta Epstein, Judy Tucker, Stasha Cohen, Sue Picus, Karen Allison
1987	Shirley Edelson, Donna Bailey, Lynn Blumenthal, Janice Randles	2/3. Rozanne Pollack, Randi Montin, Stasha Cohen, Pam Wittes, Judy Tucker; 2/3. Lynne Feldman, Ellasue Chaitt, Sharon Osberg, Judi Cody
1988	Lynne Feldman, Rozanne Pollack, Lisa Berkowitz, Sharon Osberg	2/3. Mary Jane Farell, Roberta Epstein, Dorothy Truscott, Gail Greenberg, Kitty Bethe, Susan Green; 2/3. Elspeth Moore, Andy O. Grady, Nancy Passell, Nell Cahn
1989	Lynne Schaefer, Suzy Burger, Petra Hamman, Joan Jackson	Beverly Rosenberg, Linda Lewis, Mary Hardy, Carol Pincus
1990	1/2. Jacqui Mitchell, Amalya Kearse, Joyce Lilie, Nancy Alpaugh, Pamela Granovetter, Jo Morse; 1/2. Judy Randel, Sally Woolsey, Broma Lou Reed, Marcia Masterson	
1991	Juanita Chambers, Cheri Bjerkan, Jill Meyers, Kay Schulle	Kathie Wei, Helen Utegaard, Betty Ann Kennedy, Carol Sanders, Lynn Deas, Beth Palmer
1992	Kathie Wei, Helen Utegaard, Betty Ann Kennedy, Carol Sanders, Beth Palmer, Lynn Deas	Sally Woolsey, Karen Singer, Dori Cohen, Karen Allison
1993	Juanita Chambers, Jan Cohen, Margie Gwozdzinsky, GerriAnne Klafter, Shawn Womack	Sharon Colson, Judy Pede, Jean Anderson, Carreen Hinds
1994	Dorothy Truscott, Hjördis Eythorsdottir, Mildred Breed, Tobi Deutsch	June Deutsch, Beverly Rosenberg, Carol Pincus, Lynne Feldman
1995	Kathie Wei-Sender, Sue Sachs, Carol Sanders, Betty Ann Kennedy, Lynn Deas, Beth Palmer	Judi Radin, Jacqui Mitchell, Lynn Tarnopol, Rhoda Kratenstein
1996	Sherie Greenberg, Jyme Schmieder, Fran Dickman, Diane Shannon	Joann Glasson, JoAnn Sprung, Sue Picus, JoAnna Stansby
1997	Sue Picus, Connie Goldberg, Rozanne Pollack, Lisa Berkowitz	Tobi Sokolow, Mildred Breed, Shawn Quinn, Renee Mancuso
1998	Judi Radin, Sylvia Moss, Mildred Breed, Shawn Quinn, Petra Hamman, Peggy Sutherlin	Margie Gwozdzinsky, Linda Lewis, Karen Barrett, Susan Wexler
1999	Lynn Baker, Tobi Sokolow, Karen McCallum, Jill Meyers, Randi Montin, Janice Seamon-Molson	Susan Miller, Jo Morse, Barbara Sion, Suzy Burger
2000	Petra Hamman, Peggy Sutherlin, Joan Jackson, Robin Klar, Shawn Quinn, Mildred Breed	Hjördis Eythorsdottir, Carol Sanders, Libby Fernandez, Judy Wadas, Valerie Westheimer
2001	Valerie Westheimer, Hjördis Eythorsdottir, Carol Simon, Rozanne Pollack	Lynn Deas, Beth Palmer, Jill Meyers, Irina Levitina, Randi Montin, Kerri Sanborn
2002	Valerie Westheimer, Hjördis Eythorsdottir, Judi Radin, Mildred Breed, Shawn Quinn	Lynn Baker, Debbie Rosenberg, Karen McCallum, Kerri Sanborn, Daniela von Arnim, Sabine Auken
2003	Carlyn Steiner, Marinesa Letizia, Jill Meyers, Randi Montin, Janice Seamon-Molson, Tobi Sokolow	Valerie Westheimer, Judi Radin, Mildred Breed, Shawn Quinn
2004	Hansa Narasimhan, Sue Picus, Irina Levitina, JoAnna Stansby, Jill Levin, Debbie Rosenberg	Kathy Sulgrove, Pam Wittes, JoAnn Sprung, Renee Mancuso, Karen Allison, Peggy Sutherlin
2005	Lynn Baker, Kay Schulle, Lynn Deas, Beth Palmer, Daniela von Arnim, Sabine Auken	Jean Talbot, Joan Van Geffen, Sylvia S. Caley, Marjorie Michelin
2006	Kerri Sanborn, Karen McCallum, Lynn Baker, Beth Palmer, Irina Levitina, Lynn Deas	Hansa Narasimhan, Rozanne Pollack, Debbie Rosenberg, JoAnna Stansby, Jill Levin, Jill Meyers
2007	Ping Zhu, Jian Wang, You Mei Zhou, Ping Wang, Shao Hong Wu	Valerie Weshheimer, Migry Zur Campanile, Hjördis Eythorsdottir, JoAnn Sprung
2008	Lynn Baker, Kerri Sanborn, Karen McCallum, Irina Levitina, Beth Palmer, Lynn Deas; Sam Dinkin (npc)	Hjördis Eythorsdottir, Valerie Westheimer, Marion Michielsen, Meike Wortel
2009	Daniela von Arnim, Sabine Auken, Bénédicte Cronier, Joyce Hampton, Sylvie Willard, Jenny Wolpert	Geeske Joel, Jill Levin, Jill Meyers, Debbie Rosenberg, Janice Seamon-Molson, Tobi Sokolow
2010	Daniela von Arnim, Sabine Auken, Bénédicte Cronier, Joyce Hampton, Sylvie Willard, Jenny Wolpert	Geeske Joel, Jill Levin, Jill Meyers, Debbie Rosenberg, Janice Seamon-Molson, Tobi Sokolow
2011	Geeske Joel, Jill Levin, Jill Meyers, Debbie Rosenberg, Janice Seamon-Molson, Tobi Sokolow	Marion Michielsen, Lynda Nitabach, Sandra Rimstedt, Emma Sjoberg, Meike Wortel
2012	Laura Dekkers, Joann Glasson, Marion Michielsen, Sylvia Moss, Cecilia Rimstedt, Meike Wortel	Bénédicte Cronier, Geeske Joel, Jill Meyers, Janice Seamon-Molson, Tobi Sokolow, Sylvie Willard
2013	Shannon Cappelletti, Bénédicte Cronier, Phyllis Fireman, Marion Michielsen, Sylvie Willard, Meike Wortel	Bernace De Young, Gen Geiger, Bronia Jenkins, Gigi Simpson

== See also ==
- Wagar Women's Knockout Teams
