= Wuhan Cup =

Contract bridge tournament

The Wuhan Cup is a biennial world championship contract bridge tournament for national mixed teams. It is contested every odd-number year under the auspices of the World Bridge Federation (WBF), alongside the Bermuda Bowl (Open), d'Orsi Bowl and Venice Cup and was inaugurated in 2019. The event took the name of the City of Wuhan which presented the trophy and will provide replicas for future editions.

== Winners ==
=== 2019 Wuhan, China ===
Russia won the inaugural World Mixed Teams Championship 175-170 in a match that was close throughout the two-day final. During the event, the WBF confirmed the trophy would be named the Wuhan Cup in perpetuity.

| Year | Participants | Rank | |
|---|---|---|---|
| 2019 | 24 | 1. | Russia; Alexander Dubinin, Alexej Gerasimow, Andrey Gromow, Anna Gulevich, Tatiana Ponomareva, Olga Vorobeychikova |
| 2019 | 24 | 2. | United States; Cheri Bjerkan, Allan Graves, Christal Henner, Uday Ivatury, Jill Meyers, Howard Weinstein, Joe Stokes (npc) |
| 2019 | 24 | 3. | Romania; Mihaela Balint, Marius Ioniţă, Bogdan Marina, Geta Mihai, Radu Mihai, Marina Stegaroiu |

=== 2022 Salsomaggiore, Italy ===
Tournament scheduled for 2021 but held in 2022 due to the COVID-19 pandemic. France and the United States claimed the two top places in the round-robin. Both teams won close quarterfinal matches and had comfortable semifinal victories. France triumphed 199-163 in the final to claim the title. Restrictions due to Covid-19 meant that the bronze medal match was not played, and Germany and Italy shared third place.

| Year | Participants | Rank | |
|---|---|---|---|
| 2022 | 24 | 1. | France; Bénédicte Cronier, Philippe Cronier, Vanessa Reess, Pierre Schmidt, Lionel Sebbane, Joanna Zochowska, Laurent Thuillez (npc), François Combescure (coach) |
| 2022 | 24 | 2. | United States; Dana Berkowitz, Eldad Ginossar, Debbie Rosenberg, Andrew Rosenthal, Chris Willenken, Migry Zur Campanile, Jeff Aker (npc) |
| 2022 | 24 | 3. | Germany; Marie Eggeling, Anne Gladiator, Michael Gromöller, Paul Grünke, Helmut Häusler, Daniela Von Arnim, Max Weiss (npc), Monika Luy (coach) |
| 2022 | 24 | 3. | Italy; Dario Attanasio, Irene Baroni, Leonardo Cima, Barbara Dessi, Alessandro Gandoglia, Gabriella Manara, Luigina Gentili (npc) |

=== 2023 Marrakesh, Morocco ===
The third iteration of the Wuhan Cup saw a repeat of the 2022 final, with France and the United States again competing for the title. France led after the first day, but a 60-0 fourth set saw the United States take the lead and win the title in a final score of 189-180.

| Year | Participants | Rank | |
|---|---|---|---|
| 2023 | 24 | 1. | United States; Amber Lin, Debbie Rosenberg, Michael Rosenberg, Andrew Rosenthal, Chris Willenken, Migry Zur Campanile, Jeff Aker (npc) |
| 2023 | 24 | 2. | France; Bénédicte Cronier, Philippe Cronier, Vanessa Reess, Pierre Schmidt, Laurent Thuillez, Joanna Zochowska, Nicolas Dechelette (npc) |
| 2023 | 24 | 3. | Romania; Andreea-Magdalena Boboc, Marius Ioniţă, Bogdan Marina, Geta Mihai, Radu Mihai, Marina Stegaroiu |

== Medals (2019–2023) ==
| Rank | Nation | Gold | Silver | Bronze | Total |
|---|---|---|---|---|---|
| 1 | United States (USA) | 1 | 2 | 0 | 3 |
| 2 | France (FRA) | 1 | 1 | 0 | 2 |
| 3 | Russia (RUS) | 1 | 0 | 0 | 1 |
| 4 | Romania (ROU) | 0 | 0 | 2 | 2 |
| 5 | Germany (GER) | 0 | 0 | 1 | 1 |
| 5 | Italy (ITA) | 0 | 0 | 1 | 1 |
| Totals (6 entries) | | 3 | 3 | 4 | 10 |

== Hosts ==
- 2019: Wuhan, China
- 2021: Salsomaggiore Terme, Italy
- 2023: Marrakesh, Morocco
