= Lynn Baker =

American bridge player and academic

Lynn A. Baker is an American World Champion bridge player and legal academic. She has won 14 North American Bridge Championships and won two World Championships. Professor Baker teaches law at the University of Texas in Austin.

Baker became a world champion and a World Women Grand Master at the World Bridge Federation (WBF) meet in October 2014 when her team won the quadrennial McConnell Cup. Team Baker won in a field of 26 women teams-of-four. She played with Karen McCallum of the United States and their teammates were Nicola Smith–Sally Brock of England and Marion Michielsen–Meike Wortel of the Netherlands.

== Bridge accomplishments ==
=== Wins ===
- World Bridge Series Women's Teams (2) 2014, 2018
- North American Bridge Championships (14)
  - Smith Life Master Women's Pairs (2) 2003, 2007
  - Machlin Women's Swiss Teams (3) 1998, 2001, 2007
  - Wagar Women's Knockout Teams (4) 2003, 2005, 2008, 2010
  - Sternberg Women's Board-a-Match Teams (4) 1999, 2005, 2006, 2008
  - Chicago Mixed Board-a-Match (1) 1999

=== Runners-up ===
- Venice Cup (1) 2009
- North American Bridge Championships
  - Machlin Women's Swiss Teams (2) 1999, 2008
  - Wagar Women's Knockout Teams (1) 2014
  - Sternberg Women's Board-a-Match Teams (1) 2002
