= Smith Life Master Women's Pairs =

North American bridge championship

The Smith Life Master Women's Pairs North American bridge championship is held at the fall American Contract Bridge League (ACBL) North American Bridge Championship (NABC).

The Smith Life Master Women's Pairs is a four session MP pairs event, two qualifying sessions and two final sessions. The event typically starts on the first Friday of the NABC. The event is restricted to female players that have achieved a Life Master rating.

== History ==
The event was introduced in 1961. The event is named after Helen Sobel Smith who won 35 North American trophies. She is generally recognized as the best female player of all time.

The parallel Life Master Men's Pairs was opened to women in 1990. No pair of women has won that event, but a few women have won the revised competition as part of a mixed pair, and the 1987 Women's winner Jill Meyers has won it twice.

== Winners ==
Only one pair has defended its championship—on three occasions, as Mildred Breed and Shawn Quinn won annually from 1999 to 2002.

Life Master Women's Pairs, 1961 to present
Year	Winners	Runners-up
1961	Dorothy Hayden, Helen Portugal	Gratian Goldstein, Jane Mueller
1962	Barbara Kachmar, Margaret Wagar	Anne Burnstein, Edith Kemp
1963	Anne Burnstein, Hermine Baron	Carrie Arnold, Neva L. Gray
1964	Margaret Alcorn, Betty Kaplan	Agnes Gordon, Sylvia Stein
1965	Ann Sheaber, Jan Stone	Mary Jane Farell, Peggy Solomon
1966	Emma Jean Hawes, Dorothy Hayden	Mary Jane Farell, Peggy Solomon
1967	Nancy Gruver, Sue Sachs	Mary Jane Farell, Peggy Solomon
1968	Dorothy Talmage, Rhoda Walsh	Katherine Blanchard, Mary Jane Farell
1969	Gratian Goldstein, Sylvia Stein	Karen Allison, Gladys W. Collier
1970	Bette L. Cohn, Marietta Passell	Louise Krauss, Betty Mangan
1971	Ruth Bloomfield, Delle Levinson	Betty Ann Kennedy, Carol Sanders
1972	Amalya Kearse, Rhoda Walsh	Emma Jean Hawes, Dorothy Hayden Truscott
1973	Frieda Arst, June Deutsch	Edith Kemp, Barbara Rappaport
1974	Bernice Larson, Joan Stein	Edith Kemp, Barbara Rappaport
1975	Dorothy Moore, Marion Weed	Nancy Gruver, Helen Utegaard
1976	Barbara Furbeck, Barbara Herr	Carol Crawford, Joan Remey
1977	Edith Kemp, Barbara Rappaport	Bernadine Jenkins, Joan Remey
1978	Emma Jean Hawes, Dorothy Hayden Truscott	Ann Economidy, Anne Leverone
1979	Nancy Gruver, Edith Kemp	June Deutsch, Sandi Leavitt
1980	Kathie Cappelletti, Claire Tornay	Nancy Gruver, Edith Kemp
1981	Nancy Gruver, Edith Kemp	Betty Ann Kennedy, Carol Sanders
1982	Dorothy Buchanan, Barbara Morris	Mary Albert, Rhoda Walsh
1983	Beth Palmer, Lynn Deas	Sandra Low, Joan Stein
1984	Karen Singer, Sharon Soules	Kathie Wei, Judi Radin
1985	Lynn Deas, Beth Palmer	Rama Linz, Kerri Shuman
1986	Mickie Kivel, Judi Cody	Rama Linz, Kerri Shuman
1987	Jill Meyers, Gaye Herrington	Mary Ann Coyle, Jackie Hess
1988	Nancy Passell, Nell Cahn	Brenda Keller, Renee Mancuso
1989	Rhoda Walsh, Sabine Zenkel	Lynn Deas, Beth Palmer
After 1989 the parallel Life Master Men's Pairs was opened to women players. As the Nail Life Master Open Pairs it remains parallel on the habitual schedule.
1990	Carol Sanders, Betty Ann Kennedy	Barbara Sartorius, Marla Chaikin
1991	Sue Weinstein, Tobi Deutsch	Janice Seamon, Cheri Bjerkan
1992	Shawn Womack, Jan Cohen	Joan Jackson, Sabine Zenkel
1993	Janice Seamon, Sabine Zenkel	Sharon David, Trudi Nugit
1994	Lynn Deas, Rhoda Kratenstein	Cynthia Balderson, Peg Waller
1995	Flo Rotman, Susan Miller	Lila Perlstein, Juanita Chambers
1996	Suzy Burger, Barbara Sion	Judy Randel, Linda Lewis
1997	Janice Seamon, Sylvia Moss	Linda Perlman, Hjördis Eythorsdottir
1998	Sharon Hait, Barbara Sartorius	Shannon Lipscomb, Rhoda Walsh
1999	Mildred Breed, Shawn Quinn	Nell Cahn, Ellen Siebert
2000	Mildred Breed, Shawn Quinn	Joan Jackson, Robin Klar
2001	Mildred Breed, Shawn Quinn	Jayne Thomas, Barbara Nudelman
2002	Mildred Breed, Shawn Quinn	Jan George, Roni Gitchel
2003	Lynn Baker, Kerri Sanborn	Joan Jackson, Robin Klar
2004	Cynthia Hinckley, Diana Schuld	Pam Granovetter, Migry Zur Campanile
2005	Jill Levin, Malle Andrade	Mildred Breed, Claudette Hartman
2006	Sara Sivelind, Cecilia Rimstedt	Janice Seamon-Molson, Gigi Simpson
2007	Lynn Baker, Karen McCallum	YouMei Zhou, Jian Wang
2008	Lynn Deas, Betty Ann Kennedy	Janice Seamon-Molson, Gigi Weinstein
2009	Sue Picus, Shawn Quinn	Victoria Gromova, Tatiana Ponomareva
2010	Disa Eythorsdottir, Valerie Westheimer	Lynn Deas, Judith Shulman
2011	Cheri Bjerkan, Rozanne Pollack	Nancy Passell, Peggy Sutherlin
2012	Victoria Gromova, Tatiana Ponomareva	Miriam Varenne, Migry Zur Campanile
2013	Patti Hartley, Barbara Nist	Cheri Bjerkan, Rozanne Pollack
2014	Bronia Jenkins, Bernace De Young	Victoria Gromova, Tatiana Ponomareva
2015	Pam Granovetter, Yiji Starr	Gail Greenberg, Sue Picus
2016	Victoria Gromova, Tatiana Ponomareva	Ellen Kozlove, Anne Brenner
2017	Pamela Granovetter, Sylvia Shi	Georgiana Gates, Pat Levy
2018	Sally Brock, Fiona Brown	Doris Greenwald, Terry Lubman
2019	Rozanne Pollack, Cheri Bjerkan	Gigi Simpson, Gen Geiger
2022	Migry Zur Campanile, Margie Cole	Anam Tebha, Sally Meckstroth

== See also ==
- Nail Life Master Open Pairs, Men's Pairs before 1990
- Whitehead Women's Pairs – the premier North American championship for women pairs, 1930 to present

== Sources ==
- List of previous winners, Page 7. Daily Bulletin (PDF), vol. 81–1, November 21, 2008
- 2008 winners, Page 1. Daily Bulletin (PDF), vol. 81–3, November 23, 2008
- NABC Winners - ACBL
