= World Mixed Pairs Championship =

World championship

The World Mixed Pairs Championship is a bridge championship for mixed-gender pairs held every four years as part of the World Bridge Championships.

== Results ==
World meets commonly run for 15 days on a schedule whose details vary.

In 2006 the Mixed Pairs played Saturday to Monday, the first three days of the meet, with no other events underway. There were three qualifier and three final sessions with a consolation event ("Plate") during the last two sessions. Contemporary coverage lists 481 pairs in the qualifying stage; 182 in the final stage; 238 and 232 pairs in the two-session Plate on the third day, or almost 80% of the non-qualifiers.

The 2010 champions Donna Compton and Fulvio Fantoni, from the U.S. and Italy, were the first transnational winners, but they were succeeded by 2014 champions Kerri Sanborn and Jack Zhao from the U.S. and China. United States pairs had won seven of the preceding 11 tournaments. Sanborn also won the gold medal as Kerri Shuman in 1978, playing with Barry Crane, and she is the only double winner. Sanborn/Shuman and Sabine Auken/Zenkel of Germany have won three medals.

Five champions have also won the Open or Women Pairs: Mary Jane Farell, Kerri Sanborn, Karen McCallum, Jeff Meckstroth, and Fulvio Fantoni. At one meet the best performances are Joan Durran winning gold and silver in 1966, Marcin Leśniewski gold and bronze in 1994.

Year, Site	Entries		female	male
1966 Amsterdam, Netherlands	130 (Note: on two points. WBF currently lists only the winners and runners up, neither third place nor the size of the field.)	1.	(United States) Mary Jane Farell	(United States) Ivan Erdos
1966 Amsterdam, Netherlands	130	2.	(United Kingdom) Joan Durran	(United Kingdom) Maurice Weissberger
1966 Amsterdam, Netherlands	130	3.	(Italy) Nuccia Zeppegno	(Italy) Vito Pittalà
1970 Stockholm, Sweden	224	1.	(United States) Barbara Brier	(United States) Waldemar von Zedtwitz
1970 Stockholm, Sweden	224	2.	(United Kingdom) Rixi Markus	(Switzerland) Georges Catzeflis
1970 Stockholm, Sweden	224	3.	(Israel) Rima Sinder	(Israel) Michael Hochzeit
1974 Las Palmas, Spain	236	1.	(Switzerland) Loula Gordon	(Switzerland) Tony Trad
1974 Las Palmas, Spain	236	2.	(United States) Jacqui Mitchell	(United States) Jimmy Cayne
1974 Las Palmas, Spain	236	3.	(France) Nadine Cohen	(France) Edmond Vial
1978 New Orleans, USA	316 (Note: For 1978 to 1998 the WBF currently lists the leaders (top 25 in 1978; 260 in 1998) without the size of the field. Some of those listings may enumerate the finalists.)	1.	(United States) Kerri Shuman	(United States) Barry Crane
1978 New Orleans, USA	316	2.	(United States) Heitie Noland	(United States) Jim Jacoby
1978 New Orleans, USA	316	3.	(United States) Carol Sanders	(United States) Lou Bluhm
After 1980 it was determined that the world championships in even years would continue to be played in Europe and North America.
1982 Biarritz, France	450	1.	(Canada) Dianna Gordon	(Canada) George Mittelman
1982 Biarritz, France		2.	(United States) Peggy Sutherlin	(United States) John Sutherlin
1982 Biarritz, France		3.	(France) Isabelle Viennois	(France) Jean-Louis Viennois
1986 Miami Beach, USA	420	1.	(United States) Pam Wittes	(United States) Jon Wittes
1986 Miami Beach, USA		2.	(United States) Kerri Shuman	(United States) Bob Hamman
1986 Miami Beach, USA		3.	(United States) Rozanne Pollack	(United States) Bill Pollack
1990 Geneva, Switzerland	572	1.	(United States) Juanita Chambers	(United States) Peter Weichsel
1990 Geneva, Switzerland		2.	(Sweden) Eva-Liss Göthe	(Sweden) Lars Andersson
1990 Geneva, Switzerland		3.	(United States) Kathie Walvick	(United States) Walt Walvick
1994 Albuquerque, USA	480	1.	(Poland) Danuta Hocheker	(Poland) Apolinary Kowalski
1994 Albuquerque, USA		2.	(Germany) Sabine Zenkel	(United States) Bob Hamman
1994 Albuquerque, USA		3.	(Poland) Ewa Harasimowicz	(Poland) Marcin Leśniewski
1998 Lille, France	598	1.	(Italy) Enza Rossano	(Italy) Antonio Vivaldi
1998 Lille, France		2.	(France) Claude Blouquit	(France) Marc Bompis
1998 Lille, France		3.	(Germany) Sabine Auken	(Denmark) Jens Auken
2002 Montreal, Canada	434 (Note: The WBF currently lists 374 pairs, 182 finalists and the remainder consolation. Perhaps there were 60 non-qualifiers who declined to play consolation.)	1.	(United States) Becky Rogers	(United States) Jeff Meckstroth
2002 Montreal, Canada		2.	(France) Elisabeth Hugon	(France) Jean-Jacques Palau
2002 Montreal, Canada		3.	(Germany) Sabine Auken	(Denmark) Jens Auken
2006 Verona, Italy	487	1.	(United States) Karen McCallum	(United States) Matt Granovetter
2006 Verona, Italy		2.	(United States) Jill Levin	(United States) Bobby Levin
2006 Verona, Italy		3.	(United States) JoAnna Stansby	(United States) Lew Stansby
2010 Philadelphia, USA	434	1.	(United States) Donna Compton	(Italy) Fulvio Fantoni
2010 Philadelphia, USA		2.	(Canada) Kismet Fung	(United States) Brian Glubok
2010 Philadelphia, USA		3.	(United States) Joan Lewis	(United States) Robert Hopkins
2014 Sanya, China	130	1.	(United States) Kerri Sanborn	(China) Jack Zhao (Zhao Jie)
2014 Sanya, China		2.	(Netherlands) Meike Wortel	(United States) Jacek Pszczoła
2014 Sanya, China		3.	(China) Wang Nan	(China) Zhang Bangxiang

== See also ==
- World Open Pairs Championship
- World Women Pairs Championship
