= JoAnn Sprung =

American bridge player

JoAnn Sprung (née Wellens, died 2022) was an American bridge player. She won a World Championship in 2010. She lost in the final of the McConnell Cup in 1994 and reached the semi-final stage of the same event at the 1998 World Championship in Lille, France.

== Bridge accomplishments ==
=== Wins ===
- World Mixed Teams Championship (1) 2010
- North American Bridge Championships (6)
  - Freeman Mixed Board-a-Match (1) 1980
  - Rockwell Mixed Pairs (2) 1990, 1991
  - Wagar Women's Knockout Teams (2) 1994, 2004
  - Machlin Women's Swiss Teams (1) 2004

=== Runners-up ===
- McConnell Cup (1) 1994
- North American Bridge Championships (8)
  - Machlin Women's Swiss Teams (2) 1982, 2005
  - Keohane North American Swiss Teams (1) 1994
  - Sternberg Women's Board-a-Match Teams (3) 1996, 2004, 2007
  - Whitehead Women's Pairs (1) 2003
  - NABC+ Mixed Swiss Teams (1) 2019

== Personal life ==
JoAnn was married twice. First to Ed Manfield from 1980 to 1985 and then to Danny Sprung.
