= Sylvie Willard =

French bridge player (born 1952)

Sylvie Willard (born 7 August 1952) is a French bridge player. Sometime prior to the 2014 European and World meets (summer and October) ranked 4th among 73 living Women World Grand Masters by world masterpoints (MP) and 8th by placing points that do not decay over time.

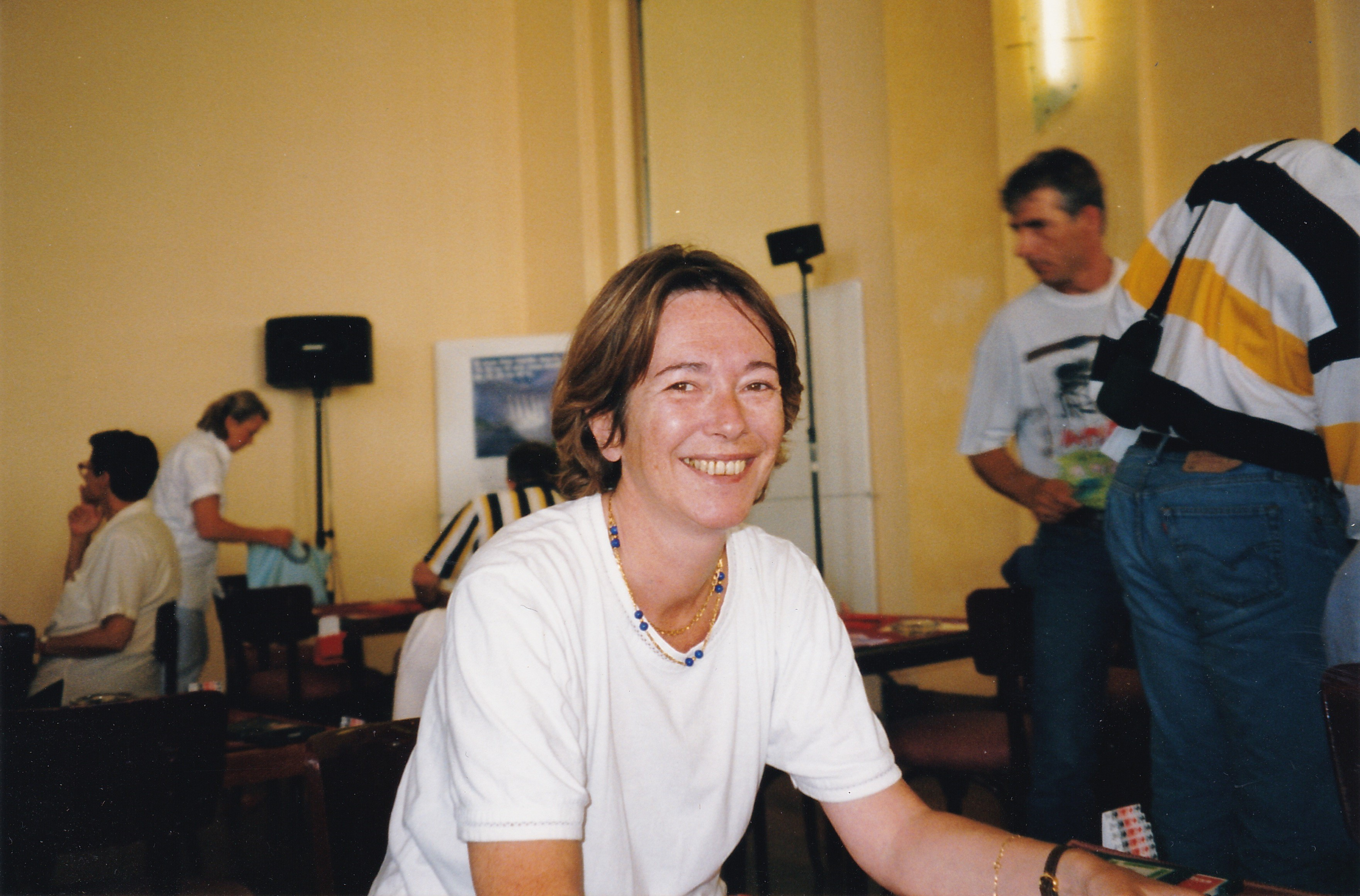
Sylvie Willard

== Life ==
Willard was born in Trébeurden on the coast near the northwest tip of France. She was one of 8 children of Nicole and Irénée Bajos de Heredia. Her father barred bridge from the home as a threat to education and invited Sylvie only at age 18 to play the game with him elsewhere. She earned a degree in computer science and studied bridge afterward. As of 2011: she is married and separated; her children Isabelle of Los Angeles and Fabrice of Paris are 34 and 33. Her husband François is a director and their son Fabrice has participated in some EBL and WBF bridge tournaments including 1998 play on the France juniors team (under-26 years).

== Career ==
In competition among national women teams, she is a 2-time world champion, winning the biennial Venice Cup in 2005, 2011 and 2015. France also won the 2002 Olympic Grand Prix, women's flight, a non-medal event in association with the Salt Lake City Winter Olympic Games. (The Olympic movement rejected bridge for the regular summer or winter program and the World Mind Sports Games were inaugurated in 2008.) She is a 7-time European Bridge League champion from 1979 to 2010 (Google Translate: "New leader of the European classification"; "This year, she moved to first place in the European rankings.").

Willard and her current longtime regular bridge partner Bénédicte Cronier (Women World Grand Master, recently 8th-ranking by MP) are both residents of Paris. For several years they have frequently participated in the North American Bridge Championships, thrice-annual 10-day meets organized by the American Contract Bridge League (ACBL). They were co-recipients of the ACBL's annual Sidney H. Lazard Jr. Sportsmanship Award in 2013. According to selection chairman Sidney H. Lazard (Sr.), "These women are the epitome of grace, good manners, cheerfulness and sportsmanship, making the bridge experience more pleasurable for everyone."

== Bridge accomplishments ==
=== Honours ===
- ACBL Sportsmanship Award 2013

=== Wins ===
- Venice Cup (2) 2005, 2011 and 2015
- North American Bridge Championships (6)
  - Machlin Women's Swiss Teams (1) 2011
  - Wagar Women's Knockout Teams (1) 2011
  - Sternberg Women's Board-a-Match Teams (3) 2009, 2010, 2013
  - Chicago Mixed Board-a-Match (1) 2009

=== Runners-up ===
- Venice Cup (2) 1987, 2001
- North American Bridge Championships (3)
  - Wagar Women's Knockout Teams (2) 2012, 2013
  - Sternberg Women's Board-a-Match Teams (1) 2012
