= Wagar Women's Knockout Teams =

National bridge championship

The Wagar Women's Knockout Teams national bridge championship is held at the summer American Contract Bridge League (ACBL) North American Bridge Championship (NABC).

The Wagar Women's Knockout Teams is a knock-out team event. The event is restricted to female players.

== History ==
The Wagar Women's Knockout Teams is a competition for teams of four to six females that is scored by IMPs with Swiss qualifying.

Until 1976 there was only one "National" Women's Team championship — and that was a board-a-match event.

The winners have their names inscribed on the Wagar Trophy, which honors one of the all-time great players. Margaret Wagar (1902-1990), inducted into the ACBL Bridge Hall of Fame in 1999, became Life Master #37 in 1943, the fifth woman to earn the rank. She and Kay Rhodes share one of the most remarkable achievements in ACBL history, winning the premier championship for women pairs in four consecutive years, 1955 to 1958 (Whitehead Women's Pairs).

== Winners ==
One Women's Knockout Teams champion defended its title without any change in personnel, in 2001. The first winner under the knockout format, in 1976, had won the last two premier championships for women teams under board-a-match conditions in 1974 and 1975. (See Sternberg Women's Board-a-Match Teams, a 21st-century name for the board-a-match event, which is no longer premier for women teams.)

Mary Jane Farrell won the premier women teams championship ten times from 1964 to 1990, six under board-a-match format and four Wagar Knockouts.

Women's Knockout Teams, 1976 to present
Year	Winners	Runners-up
preceded as premier teams event for women by the now-called Sternberg Women's Board-a-Match Teams, from 1933
1976	Mary Jane Farell, Emma Jean Hawes, Marilyn Johnson, Jacqui Mitchell, Gail Moss, Dorothy Hayden Truscott	Evelyn Levitt, Lila Perlstein, Helen Smith, Vivian Whalen
1977	Betty Adler, Jo Morse, Judi Radin, Sue Sachs	Ida Bennett, Mary Lou Cushner, Carol Felczer, Ethel Keohane
1978	Nancy Alpaugh, Nancy Gruver, Betty Ann Kennedy, Evelyn Levitt, Carol Sanders, Kerri Shuman	Cheri Bjerkan, Sue Halperin, Beverly Nelson, Florine Walters
1979	Betty Adler, Anne Burnstein, Edith Kemp, Terry Michaels, Jo Morse, Sue Sachs	Cheri Bjerkan, June Deutsch, Sue Halperin, Sandy Levitt, Beverly Nelson, Florine Walters
1980	Nancy Gruver, Edith Kemp, Betty Ann Kennedy, Judi Radin, Carol Sanders, Kathie Wei	Betty Adler, Pat Lapides, Pat Leary, Terry Michaels, Jo Morse, Jan Stansby
1981	June Deutsch, Pat Lapides, Sandy Leavitt, Evelyn Levitt, Jo Morse, Helen Utegaard	Karen Allison, Cheri Bjerkan, Lynn Deas, Dianna Gordon, Sue Halperin, Sharyn Kokish
1982	Stasha Cohen, Mary Jane Farell, Nancy Gruver, Edith Kemp, Randi Montin, Dorothy Hayden Truscott	Betty Ann Kennedy, Jacqui Mitchell, Gail Moss, Judi Radin, Carol Sanders, Kathie Wei
1983	Kathie Wei, Judi Radin, Jacqui Mitchell, Gail Moss, Carol Sanders, Betty Ann Kennedy; Jim Zimmerman (npc)	Brenda Keller, Linda Peterson, Nancy Passell, Patsy Arnett, Nell Cahn
1984	Edith Kemp Freilich, Nancy Gruver, Mary Jane Farell, Helen Utegaard, Beverly Rosenberg, Carol Pincus	Terry Michaels, Garner McDaniel, Mary Williams, Sally Wheeler, Cindy Bernstein
1985	Rama Linz, Lynn Deas, Beth Palmer, Kay Schulle, Barbara Hamman, Juanita Skelton	Roberta Epstein, Jan Martel, Lisa Berkowitz, Rozanne Pollack, Lynne Feldman, Sue Picus
1986	Jo Morse, Evelyn Levitt, Sharon Osberg, Peggy Sutherlin, Cindy Bernstein, Sally Wheeler	Rama Linz, Beth Palmer, Lynn Deas, Juanita Chambers, Kerri Shuman, Cheri Bjerkan
1987	Kathie Wei, Judi Radin, Jacqui Mitchell, Amalya Kearse, Carol Sanders, Betty Ann Kennedy	Mary Jane Farell, Roberta Epstein, Jan Martel, Dorothy Truscott, Carol Simon, Karen McCallum
1988	Beverly Rosenberg, Helen Utegaard, Sue Weinstein, Janice Seamon, Carol Pincus, Pat Schor	Terry Michaels, Cindy Bernstein, Linda Perlman, Sue Sachs, Sally Wheeler, Jo Morse
1989	Juanita Chambers, Kay Schulle, Cheri Bjerkan, Randi Montin, Pam Wittes, Jill Meyers	Jo Morse, Joyce Lilie, Cindy Bernstein, Georgiana Gates, Janice Seamon, Linda Perlman
1990	Mary Jane Farell, Roberta Epstein, Dorothy Truscott, Gail Greenberg, Lisa Berkowitz, Rozanne Pollack	Juanita Chambers, Cheri Bjerkan, Kay Schulle, Jill Meyers, Pam Wittes, Randi Montin
1991	Nancy Passell, Nell Cahn, Sue Picus, Stasha Cohen, Susan Green, Sharon Osberg	Jacqui Mitchell, Amalya Kearse, Joyce Lilie, Jo Morse, Pamela Granovetter, Nancy Alpaugh
1992	Juanita Chambers, Cheri Bjerkan, Marinesa Letizia, Janice Seamon	Kathie Wei, Helen Utegaard, Carol Sanders, Betty Ann Kennedy, Lynn Deas, Beth Palmer
1993	Gail Greenberg, Dorothy Truscott, Judy Tucker, Stasha Cohen, Irina Levitina, Rozanne Pollack	Kay Schulle, Jill Meyers, Cheri Bjerkan, Janice Seamon
1994	Sally Woolsey, Georgiana Gates, JoAnne Casen, Jan Martel, Joann Glasson, JoAnn Manfield	Kathie Wei-Sender, Carol Sanders, Lisa Berkowitz, Lynn Deas, Beth Palmer
1995	Juanita Chambers, Lila Perlstein, Gail Greenberg, Jill Blanchard, Irina Levitina, Shawn Womack	SUN Ming, GU Ling, ZHANG Yalan, LIU Yiqian
1996	Pam Wittes, Cheri Bjerkan, Sue Weinstein, Stasha Cohen, Shawn Quinn, Judy Wadas	Edith Freilich, June Deutsch, Rita Seamon, Janice Seamon, Susan Wexler, Margie Gwozdzinsky
1997	Jill Meyers, Randi Montin, Mildred Breed, Tobi Sokolow, Renee Mancuso, Shawn Quinn	Kathie Wei-Sender, Juanita Chambers, Lynn Deas, Beth Palmer, Stasha Cohen
1998	Kitty Munson, Carol Simon, Margie Gwozdzinsky, Susan Wexler, Linda Lewis, Karen Barrett	Kathie Wei-Sender, Juanita Chambers, Stasha Cohen, Pam Wittes, Irina Levitina, Jill Levin
1999	Beth Palmer, Lynn Deas, Rozanne Pollack, Connie Goldberg, Carol Sanders, Lisa Berkowitz	Jan Assini, Laurie Kranyak, Sharon Jabbour, Susan Miller, Mary Oshlag, Candace Fowler
2000	Kathie Wei-Sender, Betty Ann Kennedy, Juanita Chambers, Jill Levin, Tobi Sokolow, Janice Seamon-Molson	Joan Jackson, Petra Hamman, Peggy Sutherlin, Robin Klar, Mildred Breed, Shawn Quinn
2001	Kathie Wei-Sender, Betty Ann Kennedy, Juanita Chambers, Jill Levin, Tobi Sokolow, Janice Seamon-Molson	Dianna Gordon, Katie Thorpe, Sharyn Reus, Francine Cimon, Martine Lacroix, Ina Demme
2002	Cheri Bjerkan, Stasha Cohen, Pam Wittes, Renee Mancuso, Lynn Deas, Beth Palmer	Kathie Wei-Sender, Betty Ann Kennedy, Jill Levin, Sue Picus, Janice Seamon-Molson, Tobi Sokolow
2003	Lynn Baker, Karen McCallum, Kerri Sanborn, Debbie Rosenberg, Lynn Deas, Beth Palmer; Hjördis Eythorsdottir (npc)	Carlyn Steiner, Marinesa Letizia, Jill Meyers, Randi Montin, Janice Seamon-Molson, Tobi Sokolow
2004	Kathy Sulgrove, Pam Wittes, Renee Mancuso, JoAnn Sprung, Peggy Sutherlin, Karen Allison	Hansa Narasimhan, Sue Picus, Irina Levitina, JoAnna Stansby, Debbie Rosenberg, Jill Levin
2005	Lynn Baker, Kerri Sanborn, Lynn Deas, Beth Palmer, Daniela von Arnim, Sabine Auken	Candace Griffey, Joan Eaton, Kathy Baum, Peg Waller, Val Covalciuc, Betty Ann Kennedy
2006	Judi Radin, Sylvia Moss, Pamela Granovetter, Migry Zur Campanile, Mildred Breed, Shawn Quinn	Betty Ann Kennedy, Peggy Sutherlin, Val Covalciuc, Becky Rogers, Linda Lewis, Pam Wittes
2007	Phyllis Fireman, Tobi Sokolow, Mildred Breed, Janice Seamon-Molson, Daniela von Arnim, Sabine Auken	Hansa Narasimhan, Rozanne Pollack, Jill Levin, Jill Meyers, Debbie Rosenberg, JoAnna Stansby
2008	Lynn Baker, Kerri Sanborn, Lynn Deas, Beth Palmer, Irina Levitina, Karen McCallum	Hjördis Eythorsdottir, Marion Michielsen, Meike Wortel, Valerie Westheimer
2009	Lisa Berkowitz, Cindy Bernstein, Val Covalciuc, Joann Glasson, Betty Ann Kennedy, Linda Lewis	Cheri Bjerkan, Renee Mancuso, Rozanne Pollack, Shawn Quinn, Peggy Sutherlin, Pam Wittes
2010	Lynn Baker, Lynn Deas, Irina Levitina, Karen McCallum, Beth Palmer, Kerri Sanborn	Mildred Breed, Disa Eythorsdottir, Betty Ann Kennedy, Marinesa Letizia, Valerie Westheimer
2011	Joyce Hampton, Jenny Wolpert, Sabine Auken, Daniela von Arnim, Bénédicte Cronier, Sylvie Willard	Valerie Westheimer, Hjördis Eythorsdottir, Shawn Quinn, Mildred Breed
2012	Mildred Breed, Disa Eythorsdottir, Jill Levin, Shawn Quinn, Valerie Westheimer, Jenny Wolpert	Bénédicte Cronier, Geeske Joel, Jill Meyers, Janice Seamon-Molson, Tobi Sokolow, Sylvie Willard
2013	Catherine D'Ovidio, Lynn Deas, Joann Glasson, Sylvia Moss, Beth Palmer, Janice Seamon-Molson	Shannon Cappelletti, Bénédicte Cronier, Phyllis Fireman, Marion Michielsen, Sylvie Willard, Meike Wortel
2014	Wenfei Wang, Ran Jingrong, Hongli Wang, Lu Yan, Yu Zhang, Shao Hong Wu	Lynn Baker, Karen McCallum, Kerri Sanborn, Irina Levitina, JoAnna Stansby
2015	Lynn Baker, Karen McCallum, Kerri Sanborn, Irina Levitina, JoAnna Stansby, Pamela Granovetter	Cheri Bjerkan, Rozanne Pollack, Pam Wittes, Ljudmila Kamenova
2016	Gu Ling, Ran Jingrong, Hu Wein, Gan Ling	Joanne Weingold, Shannon Cappelletti, Jan Assini, Kathleen Sulgrove, Victoria Gromova, Tatiana Ponomareva

== See also ==
- Sternberg Women's Board-a-Match Teams – formerly the Women's Board-a-Match Teams; as the premier North American competition for women teams from 1933 to 1975, predecessor to the Wagar Knockout
