= Mildred Breed =

American bridge player

Mildred Breed (born 1947) is an American bridge player. Breed is from Austin, Texas.

== Bridge accomplishments ==
=== Wins ===
- North American Bridge Championships (16)
  - Rockwell Mixed Pairs (1) 2007
  - Smith Life Master Women's Pairs (4) 1999, 2000, 2001, 2002
  - Machlin Women's Swiss Teams (3) 1999, 2003, 2006
  - Wagar Women's Knockout Teams (4) 1997, 2006, 2007, 2012
  - Sternberg Women's Board-a-Match Teams (4) 1994, 1998, 2000, 2002

=== Runners-up ===
- North American Bridge Championships
  - Whitehead Women's Pairs (2) 1984, 1999
  - Smith Life Master Women's Pairs (1) 2005
  - Machlin Women's Swiss Teams (2) 2004, 2012
  - Wagar Women's Knockout Teams (3) 2000, 2010, 2011
  - Sternberg Women's Board-a-Match Teams (2) 1997, 2003
  - Chicago Mixed Board-a-Match (1) 2003
