= Beth Palmer =

American bridge player (1952-2019)

Mary "Beth" Palmer (August 14, 1952 – October 2, 2019) was an American bridge player from Chevy Chase, Maryland. She was an attorney. At the time of her death, she was 11th in the World Bridge Federation women's rankings by PPs (which do not age off) and 15th by MPs.

At the SportAccord World Mind Games in Beijing, December 2011, Palmer and Lynn Deas won the "Pairs Women" gold medal. Not a world championship meet, the SportAccord WMG invited 24 women from Great Britain, France, China, and the U.S. to compete in three small tournaments as four national teams, twelve pairs, and 24 individuals. The six U.S. women also won the Teams gold medal.

== Bridge accomplishments ==
=== Wins ===
- World Championships (6)
  - Venice Cup (2) 1987,1989
  - McConnell Cup (1) 2002
  - World Bridge Games (1) 2016
  - World Mixed Teams (1) 2018
  - Women's Pairs (1) 2010
- North American Bridge Championships (29)
  - Rockwell Mixed Pairs (1) 1985
  - Smith Life Master Women's Pairs (2) 1983, 1985
  - Machlin Women's Swiss Teams (5) 1987, 1995, 1996, 2007, 2012
  - Wagar Women's Knockout Teams (8) 1985, 1999, 2002, 2003, 2005, 2008, 2010, 2013
  - Sternberg Women's Board-a-Match Teams (5) 1992, 1995, 2005, 2006, 2008, 2014, 2016
  - Roth Open Swiss Teams (1) 2017
  - Chicago Mixed Board-a-Match (5) 1982, 1992, 1993, 2004, 2006

=== Runners-up ===
- World Championships (5)
  - Venice Cup (3) 2009,2015 (silver) 1997 (bronze)
  - Women's Pairs (1) 1982 (silver) 1994 (bronze)
- North American Bridge Championships (11)
  - Smith Life Master Women's Pairs (1) 1989
  - Freeman Mixed Board-a-Match (1) 2014
  - Grand National Teams (1) 2011
  - Machlin Women's Swiss Teams (2) 2008, 2013
  - Wagar Women's Knockout Teams (3) 1986, 1992, 1994
  - Sternberg Women's Board-a-Match Teams (2) 1991, 2001
  - Chicago Mixed Board-a-Match (1) 1981
