= Sue Picus =

American bridge player (1948–2021)

Susan Jean Picus (27 August 1948 – 17 November 2021) was an American bridge player from New York City. A graduate of NYU and the University of Wisconsin–Madison, she had worked as a software engineering manager and director at Bell Laboratories, Unix System Laboratories, Novell, and Bear Stearns. She was married to Barry Rigal, a bridge player, writer and commentator.

== Bridge accomplishments ==
Picus won four international events as a player and placed second in another; she captained the gold medal women's team in the 1997 and 2013 Venice Cup.

She finished first or second in every one of the eight US women trials in which she played from 1991 to 2003, bar 1996.

She won her first two US titles before becoming a Life Master.

=== Wins ===
- Venice Cup (3) 1991, 1993, 2003
- McConnell Cup (1) 1994
- North American Bridge Championships (10)
  - Smith Life Master Women's Pairs (1) 2009
  - Machlin Women's Swiss Teams (3) 1986, 2002, 2005
  - Wagar Women's Knockout Teams (2) 1972, 1991
  - Sternberg Women's Board-a-Match Teams (2) 1997, 2004
  - Chicago Mixed Board-a-Match (2) 1971, 2000

=== Runners-up ===
- Venice Cup (1) 1995
- North American Bridge Championships
  - Whitehead Women's Pairs (1) 1983
  - Machlin Women's Swiss Teams (2) 1990, 1994
  - Wagar Women's Knockout Teams (3) 1985, 2002, 2004
  - Sternberg Women's Board-a-Match Teams (2) 1986, 1996
