= Marion Michielsen =

Dutch-Swedish professional bridge player (born 1985)

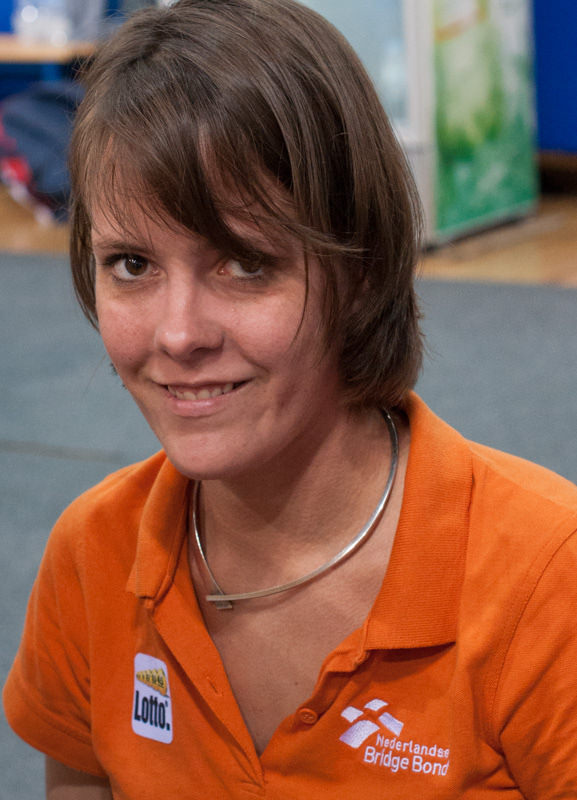
Marion Michielsen in 2014

Marion Susanne Michielsen (born 2 August 1985) is a Dutch-Swedish professional bridge player. At the annual World Bridge Federation (WBF) meet in October 2014, she played on teams that won two world championships. Thus she became a World Women Grand Master. (Note: Michielsen became a Women WGM during 2014, a year in which she played on the European Bridge League champion women team (Netherlands) as well as the world champion women and mixed teams (both transnational). See "Players Whose WBF Titles Have Changed This Year" at WBF Master Points (wbfmasterpoints.com), retrieved 2015-01-16; select the WBF Code beside her name to visit her Player Master Point History.)

In the European Bridge League championships of both 2004 and 2005, she played on both the under-21 (Schools) and the under-26 women (Girls) Dutch teams.

In world championship teams-of-four competition, Michielsen was a member of two 6-person teams that won quadrennial tournaments at Sanya, China in October 2014, namely the World Mixed Teams Championship (teams of male–female pairs) and the McConnell Cup (women teams). She played in partnerships with Zia Mahmood and Meike Wortel respectively.

In 2013, she has relocated to Sweden and now aims to represent Sweden in the Bermuda Bowl.

== Bridge accomplishments ==
=== Wins ===
- World Bridge Series Women Teams (1) 2022
- Buffett Cup (1) 2008
- North American Bridge Championships (3)
  - Machlin Women's Swiss Teams (1) 2013
  - Sternberg Women's Board-a-Match Teams (2) 2012, 2013

=== Runners-up ===
- North American Bridge Championships (4)
  - Wagar Women's Knockout Teams (2) 2008, 2013
  - Sternberg Women's Board-a-Match Teams (2) 2008, 2011
