= Jacqui Mitchell =

American bridge player

Jacquelyn M. "Jacqui" Mitchell (born 1936) is an American bridge player from New York City and was the wife of Victor Mitchell who, like her, played in international events. According to Alan Truscott, writing in The New York Times in early 1987, in September 1986 she became the World Bridge Federation (WBF) highest-ranked woman player. She has won five world titles, four of them when partnering Gail Moss.

== Career ==
Mitchell was inducted into the ACBL Hall of Fame in 2003. At the time she was a busy professional teacher as well as player.

In 1981–2 and 1983, she took part in Grand Slam, two televised matches between teams representing the US and Britain, arranged by the BBC. The 1983 match was featured in a book that described her thus:

Jackie [sic] Mitchell... is as utterly self disciplined at the table as she is away from it... She passes much of her time at the table doing embroidery as though determined to remain detached, but those who trifle with her do so at their peril. If her bidding sometimes appears orthodox, or a little too conservative, her card play and defence are of the very highest quality.

== Bridge accomplishments ==
=== Honors ===
- ACBL Hall of Fame, 2003

=== Wins ===
- World Championships
  - Venice Cup (2) 1976, 1978
  - World Olympiad Women’s Teams (2) 1980, 1984
  - World Women Pairs Championship (1) 1986
- North American Bridge Championships (15)
  - Whitehead Women's Pairs (5) 1971, 1975, 1977, 1984, 2004
  - Machlin Women's Swiss Teams (2) 1983, 1991
  - Wagar Women's Knockout Teams (7) 1965, 1970, 1974, 1975, 1976, 1983, 1987
  - Sternberg Women's Board-a-Match Teams (1) 1990

=== Runners-up ===
- World Mixed Pairs Championship (1) 1974
- North American Bridge Championships
  - Whitehead Women's Pairs (2) 1970, 1974
  - Women's Pairs (1958-62) (1) 1962
  - Machlin Women's Swiss Teams (2) 1985, 2001
  - Wagar Women's Knockout Teams (3) 1973, 1982, 1991
  - Sternberg Women's Board-a-Match Teams (2) 1986, 1995
  - Chicago Mixed Board-a-Match (2) 1989, 1996
