= Jill Levin =

American bridge player

Jillian Shane "Jill" Levin (born October 13, 1961) is an American bridge player from New York City. She has won major tournaments as Jillian Blanchard as well as Jill Levin. Sometime prior to the 2014 European and World meets (summer and October), she ranked 6th among 73 Women World Grand Masters by world masterpoints (MP) and 10th by placing points that do not decay over time.

Levin has won 3 world championships and 12 North American Bridge Championships NABC-rated events.

Levin is an attorney and has graduated from the University of Michigan and Columbia University. She is married to Bobby Levin, is the former wife of Bob Blanchard and the daughter of Gail Greenberg and Steve Shane, all of them successful bridge players.

== Bridge accomplishments ==
=== Wins ===
- Venice Cup (3) 2003, 2007, 2013
- Buffett Cup (3) 2006, 2010, 2012
- North American Bridge Championships (12)
  - Rockwell Mixed Pairs (1) 1994
  - Smith Life Master Women's Pairs (1) 2005
  - Machlin Women's Swiss Teams (4) 2002, 2005, 2009, 2011
  - Wagar Women's Knockout Teams (4) 1995, 2000, 2001, 2012
  - Sternberg Women's Board-a-Match Teams (2) 2004, 2011

=== Runners-up ===
- World Mixed Pairs Championship (1) 2006
- North American Bridge Championships
  - Silodor Open Pairs (1) 2011
  - Machlin Women's Swiss Teams (1) 2000
  - Wagar Women's Knockout Teams (5) 1997, 1998, 2002, 2004, 2007
  - Sternberg Women's Board-a-Match Teams (3) 2006, 2009, 2010
  - Mitchell Board-a-Match Teams (1) 2013
  - Reisinger (1) 1989
