= Jo Morse =

American bridge player (1931–2025)

Josephine Gould Morse (December 22, 1931 – May 21, 2025) was an American bridge player from Tucson, Arizona.

Jo Morse was born and raised in Brookline, Massachusetts. She briefly lived in Miami, Florida in her teens and then moved to Washington, DC where she graduated from McKinley Technology High School. While in Washington she met Jack Morse, who was also from the Boston area. They married in Beacon Hill in April, 1951. She lived in the Washington DC area, Tucson, Arizona and Palm Beach Gardens, Florida before moving to Boise, Idaho in 2019. She died in Boise on May 21, 2025 at the age of 93.

== Bridge accomplishments ==
=== Wins ===
- North American Bridge Championships (10)
  - Whitehead Women's Pairs (1) 1983
  - Nail Life Master Open Pairs (1) 2003
  - Machlin Women's Swiss Teams (2) 1991, 1998
  - Wagar Women's Knockout Teams (5) 1973, 1977, 1979, 1981, 1986
  - Sternberg Women's Board-a-Match Teams (1) 1990

=== Runners-up ===
- North American Bridge Championships
  - Machlin Women's Swiss Teams (1) 1985
  - Wagar Women's Knockout Teams (4) 1980, 1988, 1989, 1991
  - Sternberg Women's Board-a-Match Teams (1) 1999
  - Chicago Mixed Board-a-Match (2) 1973, 2008
