= Juanita Chambers =

American bridge player

Juanita Chambers (1956–2016) was a professional American bridge player from Schenectady, New York. She was world champion three times.

Born Juanita Tah in Ponca City, Oklahoma, to an Apache father. She married Neil Chambers in 1983. She also competed as Juanita Skelton.

Chambers died on July 29, 2016, in Dallas at age 60.

== Bridge accomplishments ==
=== Awards ===
- Fishbein Trophy (1) 1992

=== Wins ===
- Venice Cup (1) 1987
- World Mixed Pairs Championship (1) 1990
- World Olympiad Women's Teams Championship (1) 1996
- North American Bridge Championships (18)
  - Keohane North American Swiss Teams (1) 1990
  - Machlin Women's Swiss Teams (4) 1987, 1991, 1994, 1996
  - Sternberg Women's Board-a-Match Teams (2) 1991, 1993
  - Chicago Mixed Board-a-Match (3) 1984, 1989, 1992
  - Rockwell Mixed Pairs (1) 1979
  - Wagar Women's Knockout Teams (6) 1985, 1989, 1992, 1995, 2000, 2001
  - Whitehead Women's Pairs (1) 1995

=== Runners-up ===
- North American Bridge Championships (9)
  - Machlin Women's Swiss Teams (2) 2000, 2016
  - Rockwell Mixed Pairs (1) 1987
  - Smith Life Master Women's Pairs (1) 1995
  - Wagar Women's Knockout Teams (4) 1986, 1990, 1997, 1998
