= Nancy Gruver =

American bridge player

Nancy Lois Gordon Gruver (August 12, 1931 – January 28, 1990) was an American bridge player. She won more than a dozen American Contract Bridge League (ACBL) "national" championships and finished second in two world championships.

Gruver graduated from the University of Maryland and lived for some time in Ellicott City, Maryland. She died of a heart attack at Howard County General Hospital in Columbia, survived by her husband John A. Gruver, one daughter and one son.

In World Bridge Federation (WBF) competition, her second-place finishes were in 1966, playing with Sue Sachs in the second quadrennial World Women Pairs Championship, and in 1981 Venice Cup, playing with Edith Kemp on the 6-person USA women team.

== Bridge accomplishments ==
=== Wins ===
- North American Bridge Championships (14)
  - Rockwell Mixed Pairs (1) 1977
  - Whitehead Women's Pairs (2) 1965, 1986
  - Smith Life Master Women's Pairs (3) 1967, 1979, 1981
  - Machlin Women's Swiss Teams (1) 1982
  - Wagar Women's Knockout Teams (6) 1966, 1973, 1978, 1980, 1982, 1984
  - Chicago Mixed Board-a-Match (1) 1975

=== Runners-up ===
- North American Bridge Championships
  - Rockwell Mixed Pairs (1) 1976
  - Smith Life Master Women's Pairs (2) 1975, 1980
  - Wagar Women's Knockout Teams (1) 1969
