= Joann Glasson =

American bridge player (born 1946)

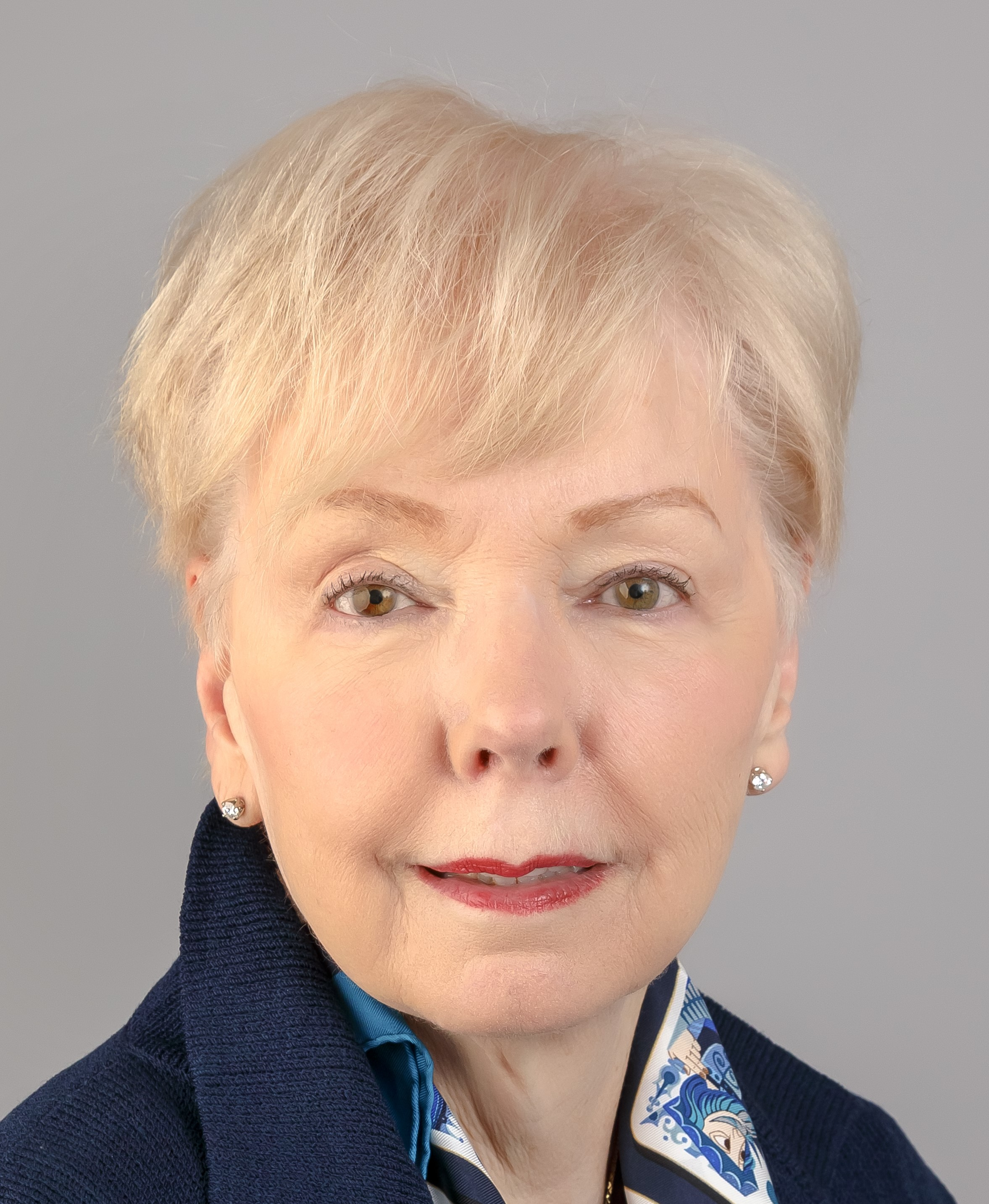
- Born: Joann Walsh; 1946 (age 79–80); Philadelphia

Joann Glasson (born 1946) is a North American champion bridge player and an American Contract Bridge League (ACBL) Grand Life Master. She served as President of the American Contract Bridge League in 2022 and 2023.

== Bridge accomplishments ==
=== Wins ===
- North American Bridge Championships (8)
  - Machlin Women's Swiss Teams (2) 2008, 2013
  - Wagar Women's Knockout Teams (3) 1994, 2009, 2013
  - Whitehead Women's Pairs (1) 2009
  - Sternberg Women's Board-a-Match Teams (1) 2012
  - Truscott Senior Swiss Teams (1) 2017

=== Runners-up ===
- North American Bridge Championships (3)
  - Whitehead Women's Pairs (1) 2012
  - Sternberg Women's Board-a-Match Teams (1) 1996
  - Freeman Mixed Board-a-Match (1) 2002
