= Sally Woolsey =

American bridge player

Sally Woolsey is an American bridge player.

Woolsey has a silver medal in the 1994 Women's World Championship and three North American championships. She is married to Kit Woolsey, who is a many-time national and world bridge champion.

== Bridge accomplishments ==
=== Wins ===
- North American Bridge Championships (3)
  - Grand National Teams (1) 2009
  - Sternberg Women's Board-a-Match Teams (1) 1990
  - Wagar Women's Knockout Teams (1) 1994

=== Runners-up ===
- World Women Knockout Teams Championship (McConnell Cup) (1) 1994
- North American Bridge Championships (6)
  - Freeman Mixed Board-a-Match (1) 2010
  - Grand National Teams (1) 2006
  - Machlin Women's Swiss Teams (2) 1986, 1996
  - Sternberg Women's Board-a-Match Teams (1) 1992
  - Chicago Mixed Board-a-Match (1) 1997
