= Peggy Sutherlin =

American bridge player

- Born: 1937 (age 88–89)

Peggy Sutherlin née Berry (born 1937) is an American bridge player from Dallas, Texas.

Sutherlin earned a B.A. from San Francisco State University and worked as an airline flight attendant. "When I applied for the job, I told them I wanted to be a stewardess so I could go to bridge tournaments. The plan worked! I was a stewardess for 37 years." She has been a member of several contract bridge governing committees and the ACBL Board of Governors.

Sutherlin was Inducted into the ACBL Hall of Fame in 2014 as a recipient of the Blackwood Award for contributions to the game "without necessarily being world class player".

== Bridge accomplishments ==
=== Awards and honors ===
- ACBL Hall of Fame, Blackwood Award 2014

=== Wins ===
- World Team Olympiad Women's Teams (1) 2000
- North American Bridge Championships (9)
  - Rockwell Mixed Pairs (1) 1972
  - Grand National Teams (1) 2006
  - Machlin Women's Swiss Teams (2) 1999, 2004
  - Wagar Women's Knockout Teams (2) 1986, 2004
  - Sternberg Women's Board-a-Match Teams (2) 1998, 2000
  - Chicago Mixed Board-a-Match (1) 1976

=== Runners-up ===
- World Mixed Pairs (1) 1982
- North American Bridge Championships
  - Whitehead Women's Pairs (1) 1986
  - Smith Life Master Women's Pairs (1) 2011
  - Machlin Women's Swiss Teams (2) 2002, 2005
  - Wagar Women's Knockout Teams (3) 2000, 2006, 2009
  - Sternberg Women's Board-a-Match Teams (1) 2004
