= Debbie Rosenberg =

American bridge player (born 1969)

Debbie Rosenberg (née Zuckerberg; born 1969) is an American bridge player. Rosenberg is a four-time world champion, winning the World Mixed Teams Championship in 2018, the Venice Cup in 2007, the World Women Pairs Championship in 2002, and the World Junior Teams Championship (as Debbie Zuckerberg) in 1991.

== Bridge accomplishments ==
=== Wins ===
- World Mixed Teams Championship (1) 2018
- Venice Cup (1) 2007
- World Women Pairs Championship (1) 2002
- World Junior Teams Championship (1) 1991
- North American Bridge Championships (7)
  - Grand National Teams (1) 2017
  - Machlin Women's Swiss Teams (2) 2005, 2011
  - Wagar Women's Knockout Teams (1) 2003
  - Sternberg Women's Board-a-Match Teams (2) 2004, 2011
  - Chicago Mixed Board-a-Match (1) 2002

=== Runners-up ===
- North American Bridge Championships (7)
  - Freeman Mixed Board-a-Match (1) 2012
  - Wagar Women's Knockout Teams (2) 2004, 2007
  - Sternberg Women's Board-a-Match Teams (4) 2002, 2006, 2009, 2010
