= Disa Eythorsdottir =

Icelandic-American bridge player

Hjördis "Disa" Eythorsdottir (born 24 July 1965) is an Iceland-born American bridge player. She is from Reykjavík.

Eythorsdottir was stripped of a silver medal at the 2002 world championships in Montreal for refusing to take a drug test covering substances banned by the IOC. This was during a period the World Bridge Federation wanted bridge to be a sport at the summer Olympic Games.

Eythorsdottir claims she was on a prescription diet drug connected with a back condition. She had asked if the drug was banned but she did not have a prescription certificate.

== Bridge accomplishments ==
=== Wins ===
- North American Bridge Championships (9)
  - Smith Life Master Women's Pairs (1) 2010
  - Machlin Women's Swiss Teams (3) 1994, 1998, 2000
  - Wagar Women's Knockout Teams (1) 2012
  - Keohane North American Swiss Teams (1) 2006
  - Sternberg Women's Board-a-Match Teams (3) 1994, 2001, 2002

=== Runners-up ===
- North American Bridge Championships (13)
  - Whitehead Women's Pairs (1) 2009
  - Smith Life Master Women's Pairs (1) 1997
  - Grand National Teams (1) 1997
  - Machlin Women's Swiss Teams (2) 2010, 2012
  - Wagar Women's Knockout Teams (3) 2008, 2010, 2011
  - Sternberg Women's Board-a-Match Teams (3) 2000, 2007, 2008
  - Chicago Mixed Board-a-Match (2) 2001, 2003
