= Rozanne Pollack =

American bridge player

Rozanne Marel Pollack (born April 29, 1948) is an American bridge player from Englewood Cliffs, New Jersey.

Dr. Pollack is a graduate of Radcliffe College and Columbia University.

== Bridge accomplishments ==
=== Wins ===
- North American Bridge Championships (12)
  - Smith Life Master Women's Pairs (1) 2011
  - Machlin Women's Swiss Teams (1) 1986
  - Wagar Women's Knockout Teams (3) 1990, 1993, 1999
  - Sternberg Women's Board-a-Match Teams (3) 1988, 1997, 2001
  - Chicago Mixed Board-a-Match (4) 1985, 2004, 2005, 2006

=== Runners-up ===
- North American Bridge Championships
  - Rockwell Mixed Pairs (1) 2004
  - North American Pairs (1) 2012
  - Smith Life Master Women's Pairs (1) 2013
  - Wagar Women's Knockout Teams (2) 1985, 2009
  - Sternberg Women's Board-a-Match Teams (3) 1986, 1987, 2006
  - Chicago Mixed Board-a-Match (1) 1991
