= Tobi Sokolow =

American bridge player

Tobi Sokolow (born July 15, 1942) is an American bridge player. She won major tournaments as Tobi Deutsch as well. As of 2016, she ranked 10th among women in the world by masterpoints and 11th by placing points that do not decay over time.

Sokolow learned bridge in her thirties, unusually late for a top player. She has won five world titles and 20 North American Bridge Championships events including the 2002 Life Master Pairs. At Verona, Italy, in 2004 she became the first American man or woman to win the Generali World Masters Individual.

Sokolow was born in Cleveland, Ohio. Her husband David is a law professor at the University of Texas School of Law. They live in Austin, Texas, where she was a real estate agent. Her son Adam is a restaurateur in Austin.

Sokolow was one of 24 women, six from each of four countries, invited to participate in the SportAccord World Mind Games, December 2011 in Beijing. Her partner was Janice Seamon-Molson. The American women won the Women's Team gold medal, and Sokolow placed third in the Individuals – a tournament (now rarely-contested) in which every player has a different partner in every round. She finished second in the team event in 2012.

On September 7, 2021, Sokolow was added to the American Contract Bridge League's "Currently under Discipline" list as having resigned to avoid possible disciplinary action.

== Bridge accomplishments ==
=== Awards ===
- Fishbein Trophy 2002

=== Wins ===
- Venice Cup (2) 1997, 2003
- McConnell Cup (1) 2006
- World Bridge Games (1) 2016
- North American Bridge Championships (20)
  - Life Master Pairs (1) 2002
  - Senior Mixed Pairs (1) 2019
  - Women's Board-a-Match Teams (6) 1994, 1999, 2003, 2011, 2014, 2015
  - Women's Knockout Teams (4) 1997, 2000, 2001, 2007
  - Women's Swiss Teams (3) 2002, 2009, 2011
  - North American Women's Swiss Teams (2) 1984, 1985
  - Life Master Women's Pairs (1) 1991
  - Women's Pairs (2) 1987, 1990
- Women's United States Bridge Championship (7) 1992, 1997, 1999, 2003, 2004, 2008, 2016
- Other notable wins:
  - Generali World Masters Individual (1) 2004
  - World Mind Sports Games Women's Teams (1) 2011

=== Runners-up ===
- Venice Cup (2) 2000, 2015
- World Women Team Olympiad (1) 2004
- North American Bridge Championships (14)
  - Mixed Board-a-Match Teams (1) 2005
  - Women's Board-a-Match Teams (4) 1997, 2009, 2010, 2012
  - Women's Knockout Teams (3) 2002, 2003, 2012
  - Women's Swiss Teams (5) 1988, 1995, 1999, 2000, 2003
  - Women's Pairs (1) 2001
  - Women's US Bridge Championship (3) 1995, 2011, 2015
- Other notable 2nd places:
  - Buffett Cup (1) 2008
