= World Mind Games =

World Mind Games may refer to:

- World Mind Sports Games, quadrennial multi-sport event created by the International Mind Sports Association
- SportAccord World Mind Games, annual multi-sport event initiated by SportAccord
