= Helen Utegaard =

American bridge player

Helen Utegaard is an American bridge player from Las Vegas, Nevada. She was born in Beijing.

== Bridge accomplishments ==
=== Awards ===
- Fishbein Trophy (1) 1988

=== Wins ===
- North American Bridge Championships (10)
  - Rockwell Mixed Pairs (1) 1974
  - Machlin Women's Swiss Teams (1) 1988
  - Wagar Women's Knockout Teams (5) 1971, 1973, 1981, 1984, 1988
  - Sternberg Women's Board-a-Match Teams (1) 1992
  - Chicago Mixed Board-a-Match (2) 1975, 1988

=== Runners-up ===
- North American Bridge Championships
  - Smith Life Master Women's Pairs (1) 1975
  - Machlin Women's Swiss Teams (1) 1987
  - Wagar Women's Knockout Teams (1) 1992
  - Sternberg Women's Board-a-Match Teams (1) 1991
  - Chicago Mixed Board-a-Match (1) 1980
