= Sylvia Moss (bridge) =

American financial adviser and contract bridge champion

Sylvia Frances Moss was born February 17, 1943 in Garden City, New York. She was an American financial advisor and a National Champion bridge player.

She retired as the senior managing director and partner at Blackstone Group in 2012.

Moss died in Boca Raton, Florida on September 13, 2022.

== Bridge accomplishments ==
=== Wins ===
- North American Bridge Championships (10)
- Smith Life Master Women's Pairs (1) 1997
- Sternberg Women's Board-a-Match Teams (2) 1998, 2012
- Freeman Mixed Board-a-Match (1) 2000
- Whitehead Women's Pairs (2) 2001, 2006
- Wagar Women's Knockout Teams (2) 2006, 2013
- Machlin Women's Swiss Teams (2) 2006, 2013

=== Runners-up ===
- North American Bridge Championships (3)
- Reisinger (1) 2021
- Machlin Women's Swiss Teams (1) 1997
- Whitehead Women's Pairs (1) 2011
