= Jenny Wolpert =

Swedish-American bridge player

Jenny Wolpert née Ryman (born mid-1980s) is a Swedish American professional bridge player and teacher. Before emigrating to North America she played as Jenny Ryman (to 2007). Wolpert is a world champion, having been a member of the USA2 team that won the Venice Cup in 2013.

Jenny Ryman was born in Sweden. She played for the Sweden women in two world championship tournaments, the 2004 World Team Olympiad and the 2005 Venice Cup. In the European Bridge League championships she played for Sweden teams from 2002 (Schools, or under-21) to 2006 (Women).

She is married to Gavin Wolpert, also a professional bridge player. They have three children and live primarily in Palm Beach Gardens, Florida.

== Bridge accomplishments ==
=== Wins ===
- Venice Cup (1) 2013
- North American Bridge Championships (6)
  - Edgar Kaplan Blue Ribbon Pairs (1) 2005
  - Machlin Women's Swiss Teams (1) 2011
  - Wagar Women's Knockout Teams (2) 2011, 2012
  - Sternberg Women's Board-a-Match Teams (2) 2009, 2010
  - Chicago Mixed Board-a-Match (1) 2009

=== Runners-up ===
- North American Bridge Championships
  - Mitchell Board-a-Match Teams (1) 2013
