= Renee Mancuso =

American bridge player

Renee Mancuso was an American bridge player.

== Bridge accomplishments ==
=== Wins ===
- North American Bridge Championships (6)
  - Lebhar IMP Pairs (1) 1990
  - Wagar Women's Knockout Teams (3) 1997, 2002, 2004
  - Keohane North American Swiss Teams (1) 2005
  - Chicago Mixed Board-a-Match (1) 1994

=== Runners-up ===
- North American Bridge Championships
  - von Zedtwitz Life Master Pairs (1) 2007
  - Wernher Open Pairs (1) 2002
  - Smith Life Master Women's Pairs (1) 1988
  - Machlin Women's Swiss Teams (3) 1988, 1992, 2005
  - Wagar Women's Knockout Teams (1) 2009
  - Sternberg Women's Board-a-Match Teams (2) 1997, 2004
