= JoAnna Stansby =

American bridge player

JoAnna Stansby is an American bridge player.

== Bridge accomplishments ==
=== Wins ===
- North American Bridge Championships (7)
  - Nail Life Master Open Pairs (1) 1998
  - North American Pairs (1) 2002
  - Freeman Mixed Board-a-Match (1) 2010
  - Machlin Women's Swiss Teams (1) 2005
  - Sternberg Women's Board-a-Match Teams (1) 2004
  - Chicago Mixed Board-a-Match (2) 2001, 2008

=== Runners-up ===
- North American Bridge Championships
  - Nail Life Master Open Pairs (1) 1999
  - North American Pairs (1) 1997
  - Grand National Teams (1) 2006
  - Wagar Women's Knockout Teams (2) 2004, 2007
  - Sternberg Women's Board-a-Match Teams (2) 1996, 2006
  - Chicago Mixed Board-a-Match (1) 2004
