= Mary Jane Farell =

American bridge player (1920–2015)

Mary Jane Farell (March 12, 1920 – 5 October 2015), also known as Mary Jane Kauder, was an American bridge player.

Farell grew up in Cincinnati, Ohio, and "couldn't wait to get home from school to kibitz whenever my mother had the game at our house." The family moved to Los Angeles when she was 17 and she began playing duplicate bridge there "with the young men I dated". She married one of them, Arnold Kauder, who was her mentor. (They divorced.) She began teaching bridge after World War II.

Mary Jane and Arnold Kauder won the Hilliard Mixed Pairs (a secondary "national" championship after 1946) in 1949 and finished second in 1950. They were second again in 1957, behind Bob Adams and Marilyn Johnson. Johnson and Mary Jane Farell became a strong partnership and won three world championships together.

Her second husband Jules Farell died in 2005.

Farell was inducted into the ACBL Hall of Fame in 1998.

== Bridge accomplishments ==
=== Honors ===
- ACBL Hall of Fame, 1998

=== Wins ===
- World Mixed Pairs (1) 1966
- North American Bridge Championships (14)
  - von Zedtwitz Life Master Pairs (1) 1978
  - Whitehead Women's Pairs (1) 1960
  - Hilliard Mixed Pairs (1) 1959
  - Machlin Women's Swiss Teams (1) 1982
  - Wagar Women's Knockout Teams (10) 1964, 1968, 1970, 1972, 1974, 1975, 1976, 1982, 1984, 1990

=== Runners-up ===
- North American Bridge Championships
  - Smith Life Master Women's Pairs (4) 1965, 1966, 1967, 1968
  - Wagar Women's Knockout Teams (4) 1961, 1967, 1973, 1987
  - Sternberg Women's Board-a-Match Teams (1) 1988
  - Chicago Mixed Board-a-Match (2) 1969, 1989
