= Shawn Quinn =

American bridge player

Shawn Quinn is an American bridge player.

== Bridge accomplishments ==
=== Wins ===
- North American Bridge Championships (18)
  - Smith Life Master Women's Pairs (5) 1999, 2000, 2001, 2002, 2009
  - Machlin Women's Swiss Teams (5) 1997, 1999, 2003, 2006, 2010
  - Wagar Women's Knockout Teams (4) 1996, 1997, 2006, 2012
  - Keohane North American Swiss Teams (1) 2005
  - Sternberg Women's Board-a-Match Teams (3) 1998, 2000, 2002

=== Runners-up ===
- North American Bridge Championships
  - Whitehead Women's Pairs (1) 1999
  - Machlin Women's Swiss Teams (2) 2004, 2012
  - Wagar Women's Knockout Teams (3) 2000, 2009, 2011
  - Sternberg Women's Board-a-Match Teams (2) 1997, 2003
