= Gail Greenberg =

American bridge player

Gail Harte Greenberg (born 29 Nov 1938) is a professional American bridge player from New York City. She has won major tournaments as Gail Shane, Gail Moss, and Gail Moss Greenberg. Sometime prior to the 2014 European and World meets (summer and October), she was one of 73 Women World Grand Masters, ranked about 40th by placing points that do not decay over time. She married successively Steve Shane, Mike Moss and Jack Greenberg, and is the mother of Jill Levin and Brad Moss, all five being successful bridge players.

Greenberg has participated in every thrice-annual North American Bridge Championships meet since 1966 and has won 17 NABC-rated events (sometimes called "national championships" in the US). She has won five world championships as a member of USA women teams including four from 1976 to 1984. In four of these wins she partnered Jacqui Mitchell.

Greenberg was Inducted into the ACBL Hall of Fame in 2013 as a recipient of the von Zedtwitz Award.

In 1981–2 and 1983, she took part in Grand Slam, two televised matches between teams representing the US and Britain, arranged by the BBC. The 1983 match was featured in a book that described her thus:

Gail Moss ... sometimes strays from orthodox ... Gail Moss is decidedly lively in her defensive play, always looking for the chance to attack, but there is the impression ... that Jackie Mitchell [sic] has tempered her partner's exuberance with some sharp reproofs.

== Bridge accomplishments ==
=== Awards and honors ===
- ACBL Hall of Fame, von Zedtwitz Award 2013

=== Wins ===
- Venice Cup (2) 1976, 1978
- World Olympiad Women's Teams Championship (3) 1980, 1984, 1996
- North American Bridge Championships (16)
  - Rockwell Mixed Pairs (2) 1978, 2008
  - Whitehead Women's Pairs (3) 1975, 1977, 2005
  - Machlin Women's Swiss Teams (2) 1983, 1992
  - Wagar Women's Knockout Teams (8) 1971, 1974, 1975, 1976, 1983, 1990, 1993, 1995
  - Chicago Mixed Board-a-Match (1) 1972

=== Runners-up ===
- Venice Cup (1) 1985
- North American Bridge Championships (10)
  - Rockwell Mixed Pairs (1) 2011
  - Whitehead Women's Pairs (3) 1970, 1972, 1974
  - Machlin Women's Swiss Teams (2) 1985, 2001
  - Wagar Women's Knockout Teams (2) 1973, 1982
  - Sternberg Women's Board-a-Match Teams (2) 1986, 1988
