= Migry Zur Campanile =

American bridge player

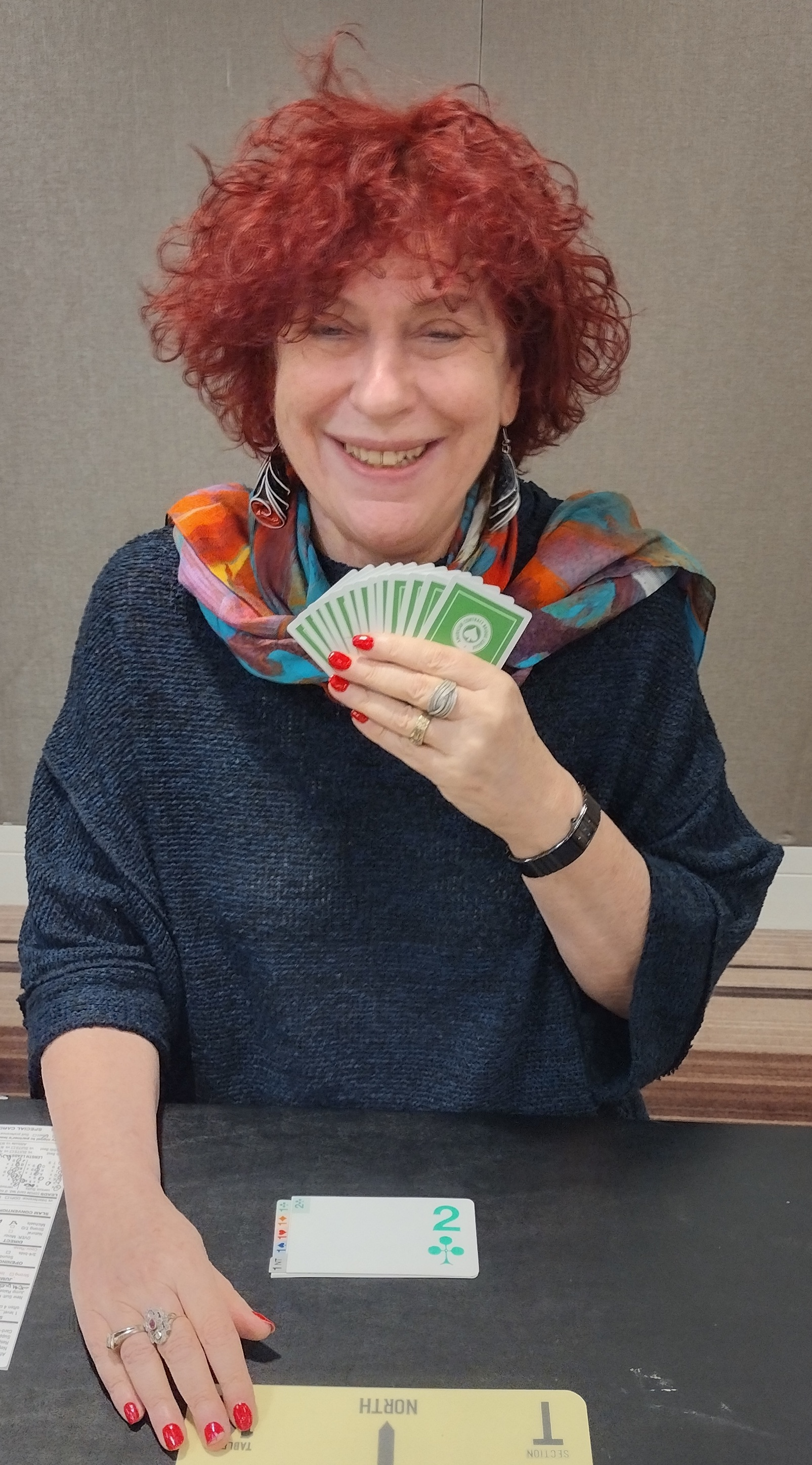
- Migry Zur Campanile at a bridge table

Migry Zur Campanile is a World champion bridge player, an American Contract Bridge League (ACBL) Grand Life Master, and winner of multiple ACBL national titles. Born in Romania, Migry now lives in America.

== Bridge accomplishments ==
=== Wins ===
- World Bridge Championships (4)
  - 4th Generali World Masters Women Individual - Ajaccio 1998 (1)
  - World Team Olympiad Maastricht 2000 - Mixed Teams (1)
  - Women's Championship (1) 2013
  - Wuhan Cup (1) 2023
- North American Bridge Championships (6)
  - Wagar Women's Knockout Teams (1) 2006
  - Machlin Women's Swiss Teams (2) 2006, 2010
  - Freeman Mixed Board-a-Match (2) 2008, 2019
  - Smith Life Master Women's Pairs (1) 2022

=== Runners-up ===
- World Bridge Championships (2)
  - Mixed Teams 2022 (1)
  - Wuhan Cup (1) 2022
- European Bridge Championships (1)
  - 8th European Transnational Championships (1) 2017
- North American Bridge Championships (10)
  - Smith Life Master Women's Pairs (2) 2004, 2012
  - Whitehead Women's Pairs (1) 2007
  - Sternberg Women's Board-a-Match Teams (3) 2007, 2015, 2016
  - Silodor Open Pairs (1) 2008
  - Machlin Women's Swiss Teams (1) 2016
  - Freeman Mixed Board-a-Match (1) 2016
  - Spingold (1) 2018

== Personal life ==
Migry lives in New York with her third husband, Pietro Campanile.
