= Meike Wortel =

Dutch bridge player (born 1982)

Meike Wortel (born 23 November 1982, Delft) is a Dutch bridge player. At the annual World Bridge Federation (WBF) meet in October 2014, she won one teams gold medal and one pairs silver medal. Thus she became a World Women Grand Master. (Note: Wortel became a Women WGM during 2014, a year in which she played on the European Bridge League champion women team (Netherlands) as well as the world champion women team and runner-up mixed pair (both transnational). See "Players Whose WBF Titles Have Changed This Year" at WBF Master Points (wbfmasterpoints.com), retrieved 2015-01-16; select the WBF Code beside her name to visit her Player Master Point History.)

In the European Bridge League championships she played on three Dutch teams that won gold medals, the 2005 under-26 Women (Girls), the 2007 under-26 (Juniors), and the 2007 Women.

In world championship teams-of-four competition, Wortel was a member of the 6-woman team that won the quadrennial McConnell Cup (women teams) at Sanya, China in October 2014. She played with Marion Michielsen. At the same meet, she and Jacek Pszczoła finished second in the World Mixed Pairs Championship.

== Bridge accomplishments ==
=== Wins ===
- European Bridge Championships (Women, 2014)
- North American Bridge Championships (2)
  - Machlin Women's Swiss Teams (1) 2013
  - Sternberg Women's Board-a-Match Teams (1) 2012

=== Runners-up ===
- North American Bridge Championships (4)
  - Nail Life Master Open Pairs (1) 2012
  - Wagar Women's Knockout Teams (2) 2008, 2013
  - Sternberg Women's Board-a-Match Teams (1) 2011

== Personal life ==
Wortel currently resides in Oslo, Norway, where she works as a biology researcher at the University of Oslo. She is a mother of one child.
