= Judi Radin =

American bridge player

Judi Radin (née Friedenberg; born 1950), is a professional American bridge player from New York City. She played also as Judi Solodar. Sometime prior to the 2014 European and World meets (summer and October), Radin ranked 33rd among 73 Women World Grand Masters by world masterpoints (MP) and 21st by placing points that do not decay over time.

Radin is a graduate of Columbia University.

In North American teams-of-four competition, Radin was second in the 1974 Reisinger champions (open board-a-match), a title few women have won. She played then as "J. Solodar" and for many years ACBL listed her then-husband John Solodar.

She became a World Bridge Federation woman grand master in 1987, along with her regular partner Kathie Wei, as one of two US teams won the biennial Venice Cup. At 37 years old she was the youngest woman WGM to that date. (Radin–Wei had played on the 1981 and 1985 Venice Cup runners-up and the U.S. gold medal winners in the 1984, quadrennial World Team Olympiad, women flight.) She returned to the Venice Cup field in 2011 and 2013 on two U.S. teams that finished fifth, and played on the U.S. national teams in the 2008 and 2012 World Mind Sports Games (which inherited the Olympiad series).

== Bridge accomplishments ==
=== Wins ===
- North American Bridge Championships (16)
  - Rockwell Mixed Pairs (1) 2010
  - Whitehead Women's Pairs (3) 1998, 2001, 2006
  - Machlin Women's Swiss Teams (4) 1983, 2003, 2006, 2012
  - Wagar Women's Knockout Teams (5) 1977, 1980, 1983, 1987, 2006
  - Sternberg Women's Board-a-Match Teams (2) 1998, 2002
  - Chicago Mixed Board-a-Match (1) 2000

=== Runners-up ===
- North American Bridge Championships
  - Whitehead Women's Pairs (1) 2011
  - Smith Life Master Women's Pairs (1) 1984
  - Machlin Women's Swiss Teams (4) 1985, 1997, 2004, 2013
  - Vanderbilt (1) 1979
  - Wagar Women's Knockout Teams (1) 1982
  - Keohane North American Swiss Teams (1) 1991
  - Sternberg Women's Board-a-Match Teams (3) 1986, 1995, 2003
  - Chicago Mixed Board-a-Match (1) 1983
  - Reisinger (1) 1974 (as Judi Solodar)
