= Janice Seamon-Molson =

American bridge player (born 1956)

Janice Seamon-Molson (born June 6, 1956) is an American bridge player.

== Career ==
She has won major tournaments under the name Janice Seamon as well. As of 2016, Seamon–Molson ranked 3rd among women World Grand Masters by world masterpoints (MP) and 11th by placing points that do not decay over time.

Born to bridge players Rita and William Seamon, Janice Lee Seamon was the only girl of three children. Her youngest brother, Michael Seamon, was also a nationally ranked bridge player. She grew up around North Miami, Florida.

She attended University of Florida, University of Kansas City, and summa cum laude from Nova University School of Law. She passed the bar, earning her title as an attorney. As of November 2022, she has won 19 North American Championships, and has 19 seconds. She has also won 4 world championships (Venice Cup 2003 and 2013; McConnell Cup 2006; World Bridge Games 2016), finished second 3 times (Venice Cup 2000 and 2013 Olympiad 2004), and been third 3 times (Women's Pairs 2006; Olympiad 2008; McConnell Cup 2014).

At the SportAccord World Mind Games in Beijing, in December 2011, Seamon-Molson won the "Individuals Women" gold medal by achieving the highest score in a series of rounds played with different and generally unfamiliar partners. Not a world championship meet, the SportAccord WMG invited 24 women from Great Britain, France, China, and the U.S. to compete in three small tournaments as four national teams, twelve pairs, and 24 individuals. The six U.S. women also won the team gold medal. Seamon-Molson's partner was Tobi Sokolow. At the same event in 2012, Seamon-Molson won the team silver medal.

== Personal life ==
Janice married Mark Molson, a well known Canadian bridge player, on March 16, 1999. Mark Molson died suddenly of complications during an operation for a dissected aortic aneurism on January 19, 2006.

Seamon-Molson has a daughter, born September 5, 1998, named Jennifer Rose Molson. Jennifer attended New York Film Academy for musical theatre.

== Bridge accomplishments ==
=== Wins ===
- World Championships (5)
  - Venice Cup (2) 2003, 2013
  - McConnell Cup (1) 2006
  - World Bridge Games (1) 2016
  - SportAccord World Mind Games Women's Team (1) 2011
  - Womens Elite Bridge Invitational Pairs (2) 2017 2019
- North American Bridge Championships (23)
  - Rockwell Mixed Pairs (1) 2014
  - Machlin Women's Swiss Teams (3) 2002, 2009, 2011
  - Wagar Women's Knockout Teams (6) 1988, 1992, 2000, 2001, 2007, 2013,
  - Sternberg Women's Board-a-Match Teams (4) 1999, 2003, 2011, 2014
  - Whitehead Women's Pairs (1) 1992
  - Smith Life Master Women's Pairs (2) 1993, 1997
  - Mixed Swiss 2022
  - Senior Mixed Pairs 2023
  - Women’s Open SwissTeams 2024
  - Morehead Grand National Teams 2026

=== Runners-up ===
- World Championships (4)
  - Venice Cup (1) 2000
  - Womens Teams (2) 2004, 2015
  - McConnell Cup (1) 2022
- North American Bridge Championships (22)
  - Whitehead Women's Pairs (2) 1989, 2001
  - Smith Life Master Women's Pairs (3) 1991, 2006, 2008
  - Grand National Teams (1) 2022
  - Machlin Women's Swiss Teams (4) 1988, 1999, 2000, 2003
  - Wagar Women's Knockout Teams (6) 1989, 1993, 2002, 2003, 2006, 2012
  - Sternberg Women's Board-a-Match Teams (3) 2009, 2010, 2012
  - Life Masters Pairs 2024
  - Mixed Swiss Teams 2025
