= Lynn Deas =

American bridge player (1952–2020)

Lynn Davis Deas (June 16, 1952 – May 10, 2020) was a professional American bridge player. At the time of her death, she was second in the World Bridge Federation (WBF) All time Women Ranking by Placement Points, which do not decay over time.

Deas was a native of Newport News, Virginia, near Norfolk, where she was a student at Eastern Virginia Medical School when she suffered a bad automobile accident in 1980. Already an avid bridge player, she played "all the time" when broken bones and blurry vision forced her to take one-year leave from school, and subsequently decided to drop out in favor of the card game as a career.

Deas won 27 North American Bridge Championships (NABC) titles and nine world championships, including three in the Venice Cup. At one time Deas ranked first among Women World Grand Masters. At one time she was on the road as a professional player for 30 weeks a year. She was diagnosed with muscular dystrophy in 1997 and reduced her travel. In January 2012, she was living in Schenectady, New York.

At the inaugural SportAccord World Mind Games in Beijing, December 2011, Deas and Beth Palmer won the "Pairs Women" gold medal. Not a world championship meet, the SportAccord WMG invited 24 women from Great Britain, France, China, and the U.S. to compete in three small tournaments as four national teams, twelve pairs, and 24 individuals. The six U.S. women also won the Teams gold medal. Beside the two gold medals Deas won $8,000 in cash prizes.

== Bridge accomplishments ==
=== Awards ===
- ACBL Hall of Fame, 2020
- Sidney H Lazard Jr. Sportsmanship Award, 2004
- IBPA Sportsman of the Year, 1997
- Fishbein Trophy (1) 1994

=== Wins ===
- World Women's Team Championships (7) and World Women's Pairs (2)
- North American Bridge Championships (24)
  - Smith Life Master Women's Pairs (4) 1983, 1985, 1994, 2008
  - Machlin Women's Swiss Teams (5) 1987, 1995, 1996, 2007, 2012
  - Wagar Women's Knockout Teams (7) 1999, 2002, 2003, 2005, 2008, 2010, 2013
  - Sternberg Women's Board-a-Match Teams (5) 1992, 1995, 2005, 2006, 2008
  - Chicago Mixed Board-a-Match (3) 1982, 2004, 2006

=== Runners-up ===
- North American Bridge Championships
  - von Zedtwitz Life Master Pairs (1) 2002
  - Rockwell Mixed Pairs (1) 2005
  - Smith Life Master Women's Pairs (2) 1989, 2010
  - Freeman Mixed Board-a-Match (1) 2014
  - Machlin Women's Swiss Teams (2) 2008, 2013
  - Wagar Women's Knockout Teams (4) 1981, 1986, 1992, 1994
  - Sternberg Women's Board-a-Match Teams (2) 1991, 2001
  - Chicago Mixed Board-a-Match (2) 1981, 1984
