= Betty Ann Kennedy =

American bridge player (1930–2016)

Betty Ann Kennedy (March 13, 1930 – October 30, 2016) was an American bridge player from Shreveport, Louisiana. She won five world championships, including four from 1974 to 1984 in partnership with Carol Sanders of Tennessee and the 2003 Venice Cup. Analyst Eric Kokish wrote concerning the 2003 final match that "Kennedy was a standout, doing virtually nothing wrong."

She studied bridge on her doctor's recommendation when she suffered from encephalitis and consequent depression. Sanders and Kennedy were known as "the Southern Belles" or simply "The Belles". They compiled 10 NABC wins and 8 runners-up together.

In 1993 Kennedy became the second woman to receive the Louisiana Hall of Fame Award. She was inducted into the ACBL Hall of Fame in 2005. She received the ACBL's annual sportsmanship award in 2011.

Kennedy and her husband Jack, another bridge player, had four children. She died in Shreveport on October 30, 2016, at the age of 86 after a fall.

== Bridge accomplishments ==
=== Honors ===
- Louisiana Hall of Fame, 1993
- ACBL Hall of Fame, 2005
- Sidney Lazard Jr. Sportsmanship Award, 2011

=== Wins ===
- Venice Cup, 2003
- North American Bridge Championships (15)
  - Whitehead Women's Pairs (1) 1993
  - Smith Life Master Women's Pairs (2) 1990, 2008
  - Machlin Women's Swiss Teams (3) 1983, 1995, 2002
  - Wagar Women's Knockout Teams (7) 1978, 1980, 1983, 1987, 2000, 2001, 2009
  - Sternberg Women's Board-a-Match Teams (2) 1992, 1995

=== Runners-up ===
- North American Bridge Championships
  - Whitehead Women's Pairs (2) 1990, 1992
  - Smith Life Master Women's Pairs (2) 1971, 1981
  - Machlin Women's Swiss Teams (2) 1985, 2000
  - Wagar Women's Knockout Teams (6) 1982, 1992, 2002, 2005, 2006, 2010
  - Sternberg Women's Board-a-Match Teams (2) 1986, 1991
