= Cheri Bjerkan =

American bridge player

Cheryl Lou "Cheri" Bjerkan (born 29 June 1947) is an American bridge player. She has won 14 North American Bridge Championships and one world championship.

Bjerkan is from Elmhurst, Illinois. She lives in the Chicago area.

Bjerkan won the women's individual championship at the 2013 SportAccord World Mind Games.

== Bridge accomplishments ==
=== Wins ===
- Venice Cup (1) 1987
- North American Bridge Championships (14)
  - Whitehead Women's Pairs (2) 1992, 2002
  - Smith Life Master Women's Pairs (1) 2011
  - Machlin Women's Swiss Teams (5) 1984, 1987, 1991, 1997, 2008
  - Wagar Women's Knockout Teams (4) 1989, 1992, 1996, 2002
  - Sternberg Women's Board-a-Match Teams (1) 1991
  - Chicago Mixed Board-a-Match (1) 1998

=== Runners-up ===
- North American Bridge Championships
  - Smith Life Master Women's Pairs (2) 1991, 2013
  - Machlin Women's Swiss Teams (1) 2004
  - Wagar Women's Knockout Teams (7) 1978, 1979, 1981, 1986, 1990, 1993, 2009
