= Emma Jean Hawes =

American bridge player

Emma Jean Hawes (née Fisher; July 5, 1912 – July 28, 1987) was an American bridge player. She won 11 national titles and four world titles during her career.

Hawes was born in Benton, Kentucky and graduated from Cornell University at only 18 years old. For 15 years she partnered with New Yorker Dorothy Hayden Truscott.

She died at her home in Fort Worth, Texas of breast cancer. Hawes was inducted into the ACBL Hall of Fame in 2002.

== Bridge accomplishments ==
=== Honors ===
- ACBL Hall of Fame, 2002

=== Wins ===
- North American Bridge Championships (12)
  - Whitehead Women's Pairs (1) 1981
  - Open Pairs (1928-1962) (1) 1958
  - Smith Life Master Women's Pairs (2) 1966, 1978
  - Wagar Women's Knockout Teams (6) 1967, 1970, 1972, 1974, 1975, 1976
  - Marcus Cup (1) 1958
  - Chicago Mixed Board-a-Match (1) 1964

=== Runners-up ===
- North American Bridge Championships
  - Whitehead Women's Pairs (2) 1968, 1976
  - Smith Life Master Women's Pairs (1) 1972
  - Chicago Mixed Board-a-Match (3) 1952, 1967, 1972
