= Karen McCallum =

American bridge player

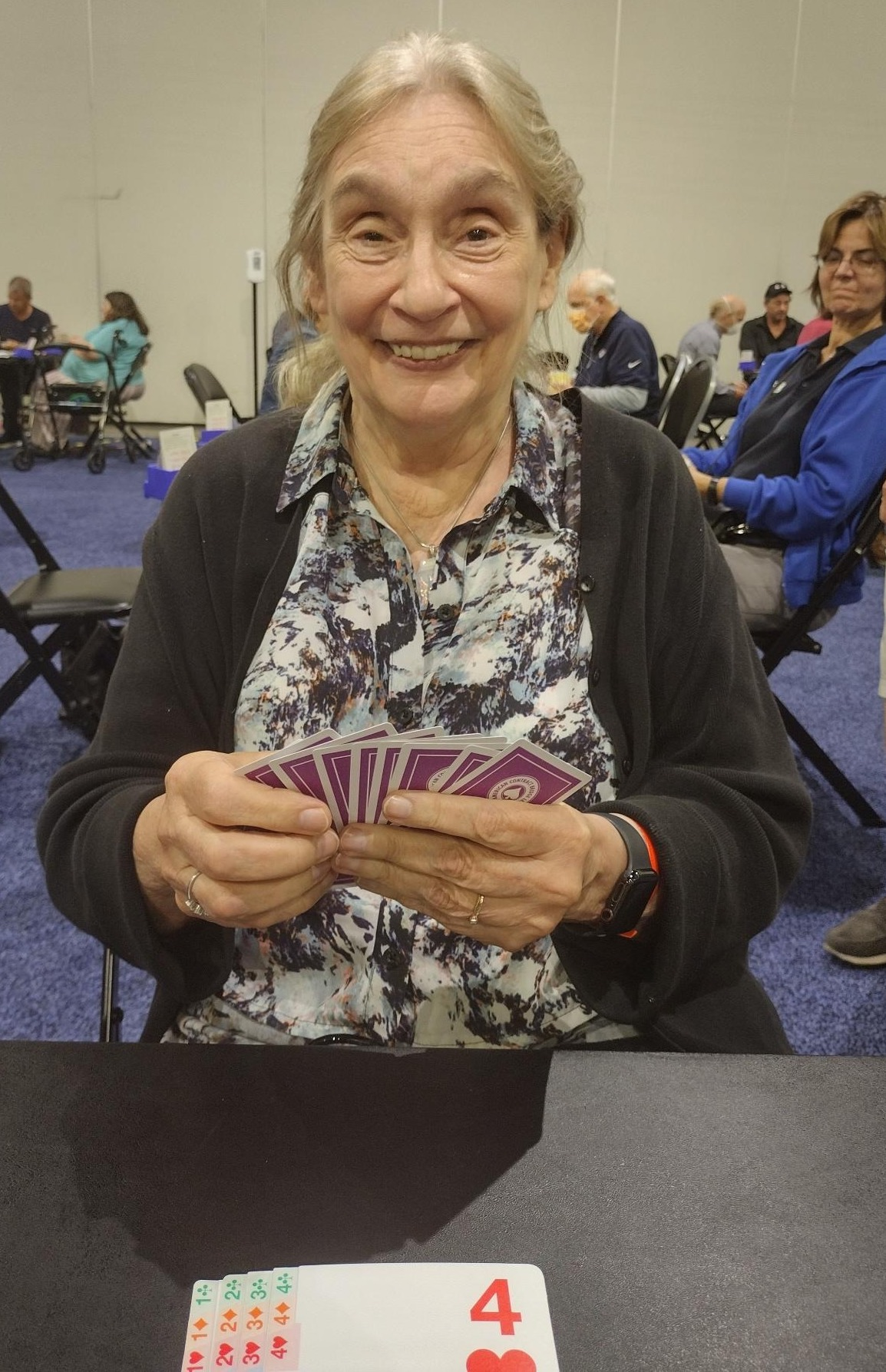
- Karen McCallum
- Born: 1946 (age 79–80)

Karen Thomas "Kate" McCallum (born 1946) is a professional American bridge player originally from New York City and Exeter, New Hampshire. She ranked 2nd in the 1990s and is now 39th among 73 Women World Grand Masters by world masterpoints (MP), and 23rd by placing points that do not decay over time.

In world championship teams-of-four competition for national women teams, McCallum played in the biennial Venice Cup tournament five times from 1989 to 2009. The 1989 team USA and 1993 team USA2 won the Cup. (From 1991 the Venice Cup field includes two U.S. representatives, the champion and runner-up called "USA1" and "USA2".)

== Bridge accomplishments ==
=== Wins ===
- World Mixed Pairs Championship (1) 2006
- North American Bridge Championships (16)
  - Smith Life Master Women's Pairs (1) 2007
  - Machlin Women's Swiss Teams (7) 1989, 1990, 1993, 1998, 2001, 2007, 2015
  - Wagar Women's Knockout Teams (3) 2003, 2008, 2010
  - Sternberg Women's Board-a-Match Teams (3) 1999, 2006, 2008
  - Chicago Mixed Board-a-Match (1) 1999
  - Wagar Women's Pairs (1) 2015

=== Runners-up ===
- North American Bridge Championships
  - Whitehead Women's Pairs (1) 2002
  - Machlin Women's Swiss Teams (4) 1984, 1994, 1999, 2008
  - Wagar Women's Knockout Teams (2) 1987, 2014
  - Sternberg Women's Board-a-Match Teams (1) 2002
