= World Mixed Teams Championship =

Bridge competition for teams of mixed pairs

The World Mixed Teams Championship is a bridge competition for teams of mixed pairs. At every table, two teams are always represented by a mixed pair, one man and one woman.

The Mixed Teams event was held in conjunction with the first and fourth World Pair Olympiads in 1962 and 1974. (Other World Pair Olympiads included a Mixed Pairs event.) One Mixed Teams event was conducted in a Team Olympiad year, 1972. (Note: WBF listings do not include the 1972 event. Confirmed 2011-08-13.)

It was revived in 1996 as World Transnational Mixed Teams Championship. The revived event has been held every leap year as a secondary component of the World Team Olympiad and its successor meet, the World Mind Sports Games.

With the Olympiad, the Mixed Teams has started after the latter's qualifying stage has been concluded. Teams that failed to qualify in the main event as well as new teams may enter. Each team must comprise at least two men and two women. The maximum number of team members is six. During play each pair must consist of one woman and one man. It is not necessary that all team members be from the same country – hence the transnational. A series of Swiss matches leads to the qualification of the top four teams for knockout semifinals and finals.

The World Mixed Swiss Teams is another world championship series for mixed teams, now conducted in non-leap even years as part of the World Bridge Series. Both now permit transnational entries. The difference is between KO and Swiss format. The leap years event is a knockout for 16 teams that survive preliminary play while is a Swiss. (All teams play several short matches every day throughout the contest, never facing the any team for a second time.)

== Results ==
Year, Site, Entries		Medalists
1962 Cannes, France World Pairs Olympiad	1.	(United Kingdom) Great Britain; Nico Gardener, Fritzi Gordon, Rixi Markus, Boris Schapiro
1962 Cannes, France World Pairs Olympiad	2.	Netherlands; Herman Filarski, Dicky Hoogenkamp, A. Kornalijnslijper, Jopie Westerveld
1962 Cannes, France World Pairs Olympiad	3.	Belgium; Louis Bogaerts, Count Claude de Hemricourt, Helen Köver, Simone Moulia, Nicolas Savostin
After the first quadrennial "Pairs Olympiad" meet, the mixed event was appropriately changed from teams to pairs.
1972 Miami Beach, USA	1.	(United States) Jacoby; Nancy Alpaugh, Bobby Goldman, Jim Jacoby, Heitie Noland, Betsey Wolff, Bobby Wolff
1972 Miami Beach, USA	2.	(United States) Roth; Gail Moss, Mike Moss, Barbara Rappaport, Alvin Roth (USA)
1972 Miami Beach, USA	3.	(Canada) (United States) Schwenke; Sheila Forbes (CAN), Bob Hamman (USA), Shirley Neilson (CAN), Jack Schwenke (USA)
1974 Las Palmas, Spain	1.	(United States) Morse; Peggy Lipsitz, Robert Lipsitz, Jo Morse, Steve Parker, Steve Robinson (USA)
1974 Las Palmas, Spain	2.	(United States) Stayman; Jimmy Cayne, Matt Granovetter, Jacqui Mitchell, Victor Mitchell, Tubby Stayman (USA)
1974 Las Palmas, Spain	3.	(United States) Cappelletti; Kathie Cappelletti, Mike Cappelletti, Bob Lewis, Lois Anne Veren (USA)
For 1996 a world championship for mixed teams was revived as part of the Teams Olympiad program.
1996 Rhodes, Greece 86 teams	1.	(Iceland) (United Kingdom) Heather; Jón Baldursson (ISL), Heather Dhondy (GBR), Björn Eysteinsson (ISL), Aðalsteinn Jörgensen (ISL), Liz McGowan (GBR), (Ragnar Hermannsson (ISL))*
1996 Rhodes, Greece 86 teams	2.	(United States) Feldman; Mark Feldman, Sharon Osberg, Bill Pollack, Rozanne Pollack (USA)
1996 Rhodes, Greece 86 teams	3.	Nahmens; Pierre Adad, Christine Nahmens, Alain Nahmias, Elisabeth Schaufelberger (France)
2000 Maastricht, Netherlands 68 teams	1.	(Poland) (United States) (Israel) e-bridge Piotr Gawryś (POL), Sam Lev (USA), Irina Levitina (USA), Jill Meyers (USA), John Mohan (USA), Migry Zur Campanile (ISR)
2000 Maastricht, Netherlands 68 teams	2.	(France) Bessis; Michel Bessis, Véronique Bessis, Paul Chemla, Catherine D'Ovidio
2000 Maastricht, Netherlands 68 teams	3.	(Austria) Wernle; Doris Fischer, Andreas Gloyer, Martin Schifko, Jovanka Smederevac, Sascha Wernle
2004 Istanbul, Turkey 130 teams	1.	(Germany) (France) (United States) Auken; Sabine Auken (GER), Paul Chemla (FRA), Catherine D'Ovidio (FRA), Zia Mahmood (USA)
2004 Istanbul, Turkey 130 teams	2.	(Bulgaria) Batov; Vasil Batov, Steliana Ivanova, Ralitza Mircheva, Julian Stefanov
2004 Istanbul, Turkey 130 teams	3.	(China) Zhang; Fu Zhong, Lu Yan, Sun Ming, Wang Liping, Wang Weimin, Zhou Qinghong
After 2004 the Olympiad meet was discontinued by the World Bridge Federation in favor of participation in the World Mind Sports Games. This tournament for mixed teams without restriction to nationality continues alongside the Games as a non-medal event.
2008 Beijing, China; World Mind Sports Games non-medal event 120 teams	1.	Yeh Bros; Fang-Wen Gong, Sheau-Fong Hu, Gloria Meng, Chih-Kuo Shen, Juei-Yu Shih, Chen Yeh (Chinese Taipei)
2008 Beijing, China; World Mind Sports Games non-medal event 120 teams	2.	(Belarus) Russia; Sviatlana Badrankova (Bel), Alexander Dubinin (Rus), Andrey Gromov (Rus), Victoria Gromova (Rus), Tatiana Ponomareva (Rus), Victoria Volina (Rus)
2008 Beijing, China; World Mind Sports Games non-medal event 120 teams	3.	A – Evertrust Holding Company; Bing Du, Lin Gan, Xu Hou, Yan Huang, Rongqiang Lin(?), Zheng Jun Sshi (China)
2012 Lille, France; World Mind Sports Games non-medal event 87 teams	1.	Milner; Petra HAMMAN (USA), Hemant LALL (USA), Gabriella OLIVIERI (Italy), Jacek PSZCZOLA (USA), Meike WORTEL (Netherlands), Reese MILNER (USA)
2012 Lille, France; World Mind Sports Games non-medal event 87 teams	2.	Canada; Judith GARTAGANIS, Nicholas GARTAGANIS, Darren WOLPERT, Hazel WOLPERT, Linda WYNSTON, Daniel KORBEL (all players from Canada)
2012 Lille, France; World Mind Sports Games non-medal event 87 teams	3.	SAIC Red; Jianming DAI, Mao Yuan HU, Yi Qian LIU, Liping WANG, Wen Fei WANG, Zejun ZHUANG (all players from China)

* Hermannsson did not play enough boards in order to qualify for the title of World Champion

2012

At the second World Mind Sports Games, August 2012, the Mixed Teams began with a 3-day Swiss tournament from which eight teams qualified for three one-day knockout matches (48 deals each). The qualifying matches were played during the quarterfinal and semifinal matches between national teams in the main events (Bridge at the 2012 World Mind Sports Games). Following those quarterfinals, and 10 qualifying matches played by 83 mixed teams, four new teams joined the latter event with a score that placed them in a tie for 12th place.

Defending champion YEH Bros returned in name, reached the medal round, and finished fourth. Captain Chen Yeh and Juei-Yu Shih, both from Chinese Taipei, were joined by two players from China and two from Japan.

The silver medalists from Canada included a mother and son.

== See also ==
- Bridge at the 2008 World Mind Sports Games
- Bridge at the 2012 World Mind Sports Games
