= Edith Freilich =

American bridge player (1911–2011)

Edith Freilich née Seamon (September 8, 1911 - May 14, 2011) was an American bridge player, "one of the world's greatest female bridge players". As a player in important tournaments, she was also known as Edith Seligman, Edith Kemp, and Edith Kemp Freilich. Among women, she is second to Helen Sobel Smith for winning the greatest number of North American Bridge Championships. She was from Miami Beach, Florida.

Edith Seamon was raised in South Orange, New Jersey. Her brother, Billy Seamon, and sister, Anne Burnstein, also became leading bridge players.

Freilich won the top two KO events on the ACBL calendar, the Vanderbilt and Spingold, in 1963.

In 1984, her team won the Wagar.

Freilich was inducted into the ACBL Hall of Fame in 1997.

Freilich died in Miami on May 14, 2011.

== Bridge accomplishments ==
=== Honors ===
- ACBL Hall of Fame, 1997

=== Wins ===
- North American Bridge Championships (30)
  - Whitehead Women's Pairs (7) 1941, 1942, 1943, 1946, 1966, 1979, 1986
  - Open Pairs (1928-1962) (1) 1943
  - Smith Life Master Women's Pairs (3) 1977, 1979, 1981
  - Machlin Women's Swiss Teams (1) 1982
  - Vanderbilt (1) 1963
  - Wagar Women's Knockout Teams (8) 1951, 1962, 1965, 1969, 1979, 1980, 1982, 1984
  - Chicago Mixed Board-a-Match (5) 1947, 1952, 1953, 1957, 1974
  - Reisinger (2) 1946, 1952
  - Spingold (2) 1953, 1963

=== Runners-up ===
- Venice Cup (1) 1982
- North American Bridge Championships
  - von Zedtwitz Life Master Pairs (1) 1962
  - Whitehead Women's Pairs (2) 1957, 1978
  - Smith Life Master Women's Pairs (4) 1962, 1973, 1974, 1980
  - Grand National Teams (1) 1980
  - Vanderbilt (1) 1960
  - Wagar Women's Knockout Teams (4) 1948, 1955, 1971, 1996
  - Chicago Mixed Board-a-Match (4) 1942, 1945, 1948, 1964
  - Reisinger (1) 1964
  - Spingold (1) 1972
