= Sabine Auken =

German bridge player

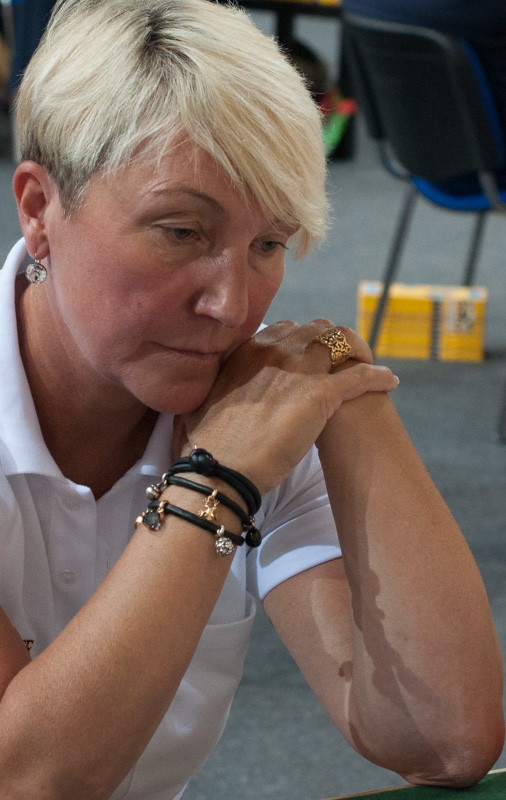
- Auken in June 2014

Personal information
- Nationality: German
- Citizenship: German
- Born: January 4, 1965 (age 61) Bamberg, Bavaria
- Spouse: Jens Auken
- Children: 2

Sport
- Country: Germany
- Sport: Bridge
- National league: 1. German Bridge-Bundesliga
- Club: BC München
- Team: BC München
- Partner: Ron Andersen (former)

Achievements and titles
- National finals: Winner of the Team-Bundesliga (2017)
- Highest world ranking: 24th Women World Grand Master (by WMP), 4th (by placing points)

Sabine Auken (née Zenkel, born 4 January 1965) is a German bridge player. She has also played as Sabine Zenkel. Sometime prior to the 2014 European and World meets (summer and October), she ranked 24th among 73 Women World Grand Masters by world masterpoints (MP) and 4th by placing points that do not decay over time.

She was born in Bamberg, Bavaria. As of 2007 she resides in Charlottenlund, Denmark. She and Jens Auken, a Danish bridge player, have two children, Jens Christian (b. 1995) and Maximilian (b. 1999). Maximillian has had success playing basketball, making the U14, U15 and U16 Danish national teams.

At national level she plays for BC München in the 1. German Bridge-Bundesliga. She, along with Roy Welland and the BC München won the 2017 Team-Bundesliga.

Zenkel and the American professional player Ron Andersen traveled the world as a partnership during 1991–1992, based in Chicago. They also wrote a book, Preempts from A to Z (1993; 2nd, 1996).

== Books ==
- Preempts from A to Z, Ron Andersen and Sabine Zenkel (Stamford, CT: Magnus Books, 1993), 290 pp., LCCN 98-79256
- I Love This Game, Auken and Mark Horton, editor (Master Point Press, 2006), 207 pp., OCLC 62346636

== Bridge accomplishments ==
=== Awards ===
- EBL Bronze Medal (1) 2010
- EBL Hall of Fame (1) 2018

=== Wins ===
- Venice Cup (2) 1995, 2001
- IOC Grand Prix Women Teams (1) 1999
- World Bridge Series (1)
  - Mixed Teams (1) 2014
- World Bridge Games (1)
  - Open Pairs (1) 2016
- World Transnational Mixed Team Championships (1) 2004
- Buffett Cup (1) 2008
- European Team Championships (3)
  - Women Teams (1) 1989
  - Women Pairs (3) 1995, 1997, 2001
- European Mixed Championships (3)
  - Mixed Teams (1) 2000
  - Mixed Pairs (1) 1996
  - Mixed Pairs (1) 1994
- European Open Bridge Championships (1)
  - Open Pairs (1) 2013
- North American Bridge Championships (14)
  - Smith Life Master Women's Pairs (2) 1989, 1993
  - Jacoby Open Swiss Teams (1) 2014
  - Machlin Women's Swiss Teams (2) 1990, 2011
  - Vanderbilt (1) 2013
  - Spingold (1) 2016
  - Wagar Women's Knockout Teams (3) 2005, 2007, 2011
  - Sternberg Women's Board-a-Match Teams (3) 2005, 2009, 2010
  - Chicago Mixed Board-a-Match (1) 2009

==== Other notable wins ====
- Lisbon Masters Invitational 2019
- Moscow Invitational Slava Cup 2010, 2016
- South American Bridge Championships 2016
- German Open Team Championships 2011, 2019
- German Bundesliga Pair Championships 2018
- German Bundesliga Team Championships 2017
- 1st Women Pairs Common Market Championships 1985 Bordeaux

=== Runners-up ===
- Venice Cup (3) 1993, 2005, 2007
- World Mixed Pairs (1) 1994
- Open World Women Team Championships 1998
- World Women Pairs (2) 1998, 2016
- Buffett Cup (2) 2006, 2010
- European Women Team Championships (3) 1991, 1995, 2002
- European Mixed Team Championships (1) 1996
- European Mixed Pairs Championships 2017
- European Winter Games Board-a-Match 2020
- North American Bridge Championships
  - Rockwell Mixed Pairs (1) 1993
  - Blue Ribbon Pairs (1) 2005
  - Smith Life Master Women's Pairs (1) 1992
  - Sternberg Women's Board-a-Match Teams (1) 2002
  - Chicago Mixed Board-a-Match (1) 1994
  - Reisinger (1) 2012
