= Carol Sanders =

American bridge player (1932–2012)

Carol Melton Sanders (July 30, 1932 – August 28, 2012) was an American bridge player from Nashville, Tennessee. She was married to Thomas K. Sanders, also a bridge player. She won four world championships, all in partnership with Betty Ann Kennedy of Louisiana.

Sanders and Kennedy were known as the Belles or Southern Belles. They compiled 10 NABC wins and 8 runners-up together.

Both Carol and Tom Sanders were inducted into the ACBL Hall of Fame in 2002.

Sanders was the only child of Beulah and Clarence Melton. She died in Nashville in 2012, less than a year after the death of her husband.

== Bridge accomplishments ==
=== Honors ===
- ACBL Hall of Fame, 2002

=== Wins ===
- North American Bridge Championships (16)
  - Whitehead Women's Pairs (1) 1993
  - Hilliard Mixed Pairs (1) 1961
  - Women's Pairs (1958-62) (1) 1962
  - Smith Life Master Women's Pairs (1) 1990
  - Machlin Women's Swiss Teams (2) 1983, 1995
  - Wagar Women's Knockout Teams (6) 1963, 1978, 1980, 1983, 1987, 1999
  - Sternberg Women's Board-a-Match Teams (2) 1992, 1995
  - Chicago Mixed Board-a-Match (2) 1976, 1982

=== Runners-up ===
- North American Bridge Championships
  - Rockwell Mixed Pairs (1) 1979
  - Silodor Open Pairs (1) 1960
  - Whitehead Women's Pairs (1) 1990
  - Smith Life Master Women's Pairs (2) 1971, 1981
  - Machlin Women's Swiss Teams (1) 1985
  - Wagar Women's Knockout Teams (3) 1982, 1992, 1994
  - Sternberg Women's Board-a-Match Teams (3) 1986, 1991, 2000
  - Chicago Mixed Board-a-Match (1) 1984
  - Reisinger (1) 1961
