= Jill Meyers =

American bridge player

- Education: Tulane University (BA); University of West Los Angeles
- Occupation: Bridge Player

Jill J. Meyers (born February 13, 1950) is an American bridge player from Santa Monica, California. Sometime prior to the 2014 European and World meets (summer and October), she ranked 7th among 73 Women World Grand Masters by world masterpoints (MP) and 1st by placing points that do not decay over time.

Meyers was born in New York City and earned a B.A. from Tulane University. She and her sister Nina moved to Los Angeles in 1972 and started to play duplicate bridge there, where Ed Davis was her first teacher (they still have a partnership). From 1979 she studied law at University of West Los Angeles and she passed the California bar in 1983, after which she played bridge more seriously. She is married to Sid Brownstein and is a self-employed "Music Consultant for Motion Picture, TV and Advertising industries". Before 1988 she worked in music departments within the film industry.

Meyers was inducted ito the ACBL Hall of Fame in 2014.

== Bridge accomplishments ==
=== Awards and honors ===
- Herman Trophy (1) 1987
- Mott-Smith Trophy (1) 2001
- ACBL Hall of Fame, 2014

=== Wins ===
- North American Bridge Championships (17)
  - Blue Ribbon Pairs (1) 1999
  - Nail Life Master Open Pairs (2) 2000, 2005
  - Smith Life Master Women's Pairs (1) 1987
  - Freeman Mixed Board-a-Match (1) 2010
  - Grand National Teams (1) 2001
  - Machlin Women's Swiss Teams (5) 1991, 1993, 2001, 2009, 2011
  - Wagar Women's Knockout Teams (2) 1989, 1997
  - Sternberg Women's Board-a-Match Teams (4) 1991, 1999, 2003, 2011

=== Runners-up ===
- North American Bridge Championships
  - Silodor Open Pairs (1) 2011
  - North American Pairs (1) 2001
  - Grand National Teams (2) 1999, 2010
  - Machlin Women's Swiss Teams (4) 1987, 1995, 1999, 2003
  - Wagar Women's Knockout Teams (5) 1990, 1993, 2003, 2007, 2012
  - Keohane North American Swiss Teams (1) 1987
  - Sternberg Women's Board-a-Match Teams (5) 2001, 2006, 2009, 2010, 2012
