= Bénédicte Cronier =

French bridge player (born 1961)

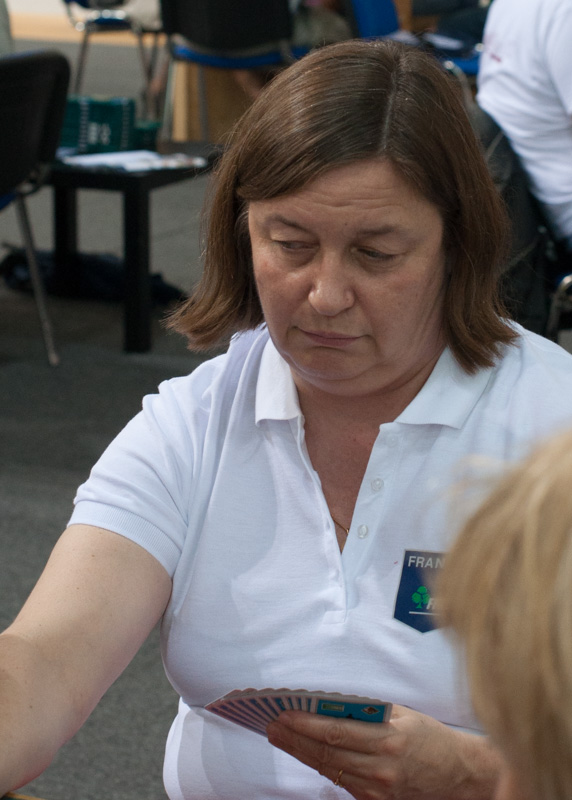
Bénédicte Cronier (2014)

Bénédicte Cronier (born 1961) is a French bridge player.

== Bridge accomplishments ==
=== Wins ===
- Venice Cup (2) 2005, 2011
- North American Bridge Championships (6)
  - Freeman Mixed Board-a-Match (1) 2015
  - Machlin Women's Swiss Teams (1) 2011
  - Sternberg Women's Board-a-Match Teams (3) 2009, 2010, 2013
  - Wagar Women's Knockout Teams (1) 2011

=== Runners-up ===
- Venice Cup (2) 1987, 2001
- North American Bridge Championships (3)
  - Sternberg Women's Board-a-Match Teams (1) 2012
  - Wagar Women's Knockout Teams (2) 2012, 2013
