= Katherine Wei-Sender =

Chinese-American bridge player (1930–2024)

Katherine Wei-Sender 杨小燕
- Born: October 4, 1930; Beiping, China
- Died: May 15, 2024 (aged 93)
- Occupation: Bridge player
- Spouses: Shen Chang-rui (1949–1967); C. C. Wei (1967–1987); Henry Sender (1992–2024)

Katherine Wei-Sender (October 4, 1930 – May 15, 2024), born Yang Xiaoyan (Chinese: 杨小燕), was a Chinese American contract bridge player. She won major tournaments primarily as Kathie Wei.

== Biography ==
Born in Beijing in 1930, she went to the United States in 1949. She was a graduate of the Shanghai University School of Nursing, and worked as a medical facility administrator until 1972.

After retirement, she became interested in bridge. She won the world Women's Pairs in 1978, the Women's Olympiad Teams in 1984 and the Venice Cup in 1987 and 2003. In 1987 Wei-Sender was elected an ACBL Honorary Member, and the Ambassador of Bridge for the World Bridge Federation.

Wei-Sender was from Nashville, Tennessee and New York City. She died on May 15, 2024, at the age of 93.

Wei-Sender was Inducted into the ACBL Hall of Fame in 1999.

== Publications ==
- Action for the Defense: when the enemy opens the bidding, Katherine Wei and Ron Andersen (New York: Monna Lisa Precision Corp., 1980), 245 pp., OCLC 9272267
- "Defending Against Strong Club Openings", Katherine Wei, ed. Ron Andersen (Louisville, KY: Devyn Press, 1981), 9 pp. – Championship bridge series, no. 7, OCLC 30316772
- Precision's One Club Complete, Katherine Wei and Judi Radin, ed. Ron Andersen (Monna Lisa, 1981), 169 pp., OCLC 19110524
- Second Daughter: growing up in China, 1930–1949, Katherine Wei and Terry Quinn (Little, Brown, 1984), 243 pp. OCLC 10605894
- On the Other Hand: a bridge from East to West, Martin Hoffman and Kathie Wei-Sender (Los Angeles: C&T Bridge Supplies, 1994), 135 pp., OCLC 45223272
- Precision Today: your guide to learning the system—or fine-tuning your precision partnership, David Berkowitz and Brent Manley, ed. Kathie Wei-Sender (Memphis, TN: DBM Publications, 2002), 219 pp., OCLC 64033292
- The Wei of Good Bridge, Kathie Wei-Sender and Martin Hoffman with David Burn (London: B.T. Batsford, 2003), 143 pp. OCLC 56469909
