= 0-10,000 Fast Pairs =

Contract bridge tournament

The 0-10,000 Fast Pairs or 10K Fast Pairs is held at the Fall American Contract Bridge League (ACBL) North American Bridge Championship (NABC).

The 10K Fast Pairs is a four-session matchpoint pairs event with two qualifying sessions and two final sessions; tables are permitted 11 minutes to finish their two-board rounds, rather than the standard 15 minutes. The event is restricted to players with fewer than 10,000 masterpoints.

== History ==
The inaugural 10K Fast Pairs was held in 2015 at the Fall NABC in Denver, Colorado.

== Winners ==
Year	Winners	Runners-up
2015	Vladislav Isporski, James Melville	David MacRae, Christina van Leeuwen
2016	Mary Jane Gladfelter, Michael Gladfelter	Rob Gordon, Dori Cohen
2017	Daniel Miles, Justyna Zmuda	Joan Brody, Radu Nistor
2018	Hiroaki Miura, Keiko Miwa	Joshua Donn, Peter Gelfand
2019	David Rodney, Rusty Krauss	Li Yiting, Laura Dekkers
2020	Not held due to COVID-19	Not held due to COVID-19
2021	Bryan Delfs, Marc Sylvester	Greg Resz, Jeff McKee
2022	Mike Develin, Eric Mayefsky	Rick Clelland, Ying Zhang

== Sources ==
- "ACBL - NABC Winners". acbl.org. ACBL.
- "ACBL Live" acbl.org. ACBL. Retrieved 1 August 2019.
- "NABC Winners" acbl.org. ACBL. Retrieved 13 November 2020
