= Nicolas Hammond =

Businessman

Nicolas Hammond is a British Rubik's Cube expert and businessman. He has lived in the US since 1986. He made the world's first Internet banking transaction.

== Early life ==
Nicolas Hammond was born in Attenborough, Nottinghamshire, England. He was awarded an academic scholarship to Nottingham High School and an academic scholarship to Gonville and Caius College, Cambridge where he earned a Bachelor of Arts degree in 1986 and was awarded a master's degree in 1990.

Hammond is divorced with two sons and one daughter.

== Rubik's Cube ==
Hammond was introduced to the Rubik's Cube in 1979 by Peter Horrill, head of mathematics at Nottingham High School. The early cubes often broke and Hammond started corresponding with David Singmaster who was importing and selling Rubik's Cubes. Singmaster reported Hammond's speed in solving the Rubik's Cube (28 seconds) in his Rubik's Notes and later in his Cubic Circular. By 1980, Hammond had the fastest times for solving the Rubik's Cube. Reader's Digest, Scientific American (March 1981), and TIME (March 1981) covered Hammond as one of the world's first cube-meisters.

Hammond was the fastest qualifier for the first British Rubik's Cube Championship when he won the Midlands heat of the British Rubik's Cube Championship with a time of 35.38 seconds but did not win the event.

Hammond used a computer to determine an upper bound of 21 moves for the Rubik's Cube U group.

== Television appearances ==
On 24 January 1981 Hammond appeared on BBC TV's live Saturday morning show Multi-Coloured Swap Shop with Ernő Rubik and solved the Rubik's Cube in 37 seconds. This was the first solving of the Rubik's Cube on national television in England. Two weeks later, five others tried to beat this time, the closest was 57 seconds.

Hammond solved the cube on other television shows including The Paul Daniels Magic Show, Midlands Today, ATV Today, as well as appearing on The Adventure Game with Graeme Garden, Carol Chell and Lesley Judd on 2 November 1981.

In December 2006, almost 25 years after his first appearance on TV, Hammond appeared on Swap Shop and solved the Rubik's Cube in 36 seconds.

== Publications ==
- — (1981). How To Solve The Cube in 37 Seconds. DRG Blackhall. The book describes the various techniques that Hammond uses to solve the cube. It is based on the bottom, middle, upper layer approach and includes tables to help improve speed. The book also includes a simple, five move, solution to solve the Rubik's Cube.
- — (2019). Detecting Cheating in Bridge - (1st ed.). ISBN 9780982235553. 206 pages.

== Business ==
Hammond founded NJH Security Consulting, a company specialising in performing Internet security audits for banks, stockbrokers, stock markets in 1996. He also started Intelligent Shopping, a company that created software for purchasing highly secure products over the Internet in the same year. Both companies were sold to Internet Security Systems in 1999. He is semi-retired.

== Field hockey ==
Hammond started the Georgia Field Hockey Association (GFHA) in February 1991. He was one of the English speaking stadium announcers for hockey in the 1996 Summer Olympics in Atlanta and announced the men's final. He umpired a friendly women's international game between Spain and USA in 1995.

== Bridge ==
Hammond started playing competitive bridge in 2002. At the 2010 world championship meet in Philadelphia, he and Willem van Eijck entered two events and finished 13th in the World IMP Pairs Championship.

Hammond and Edward Foran won the Sally Young Pairs at the American Contract Bridge League (ACBL) North American Bridge Championships (NABC) meet at Atlanta in 2005. The Sally Young is a two-day event open to ACBL Life Masters with no more than 1500 masterpoints. He finished second in the Victor Daly KO Teams at the summer American Bridge Association (ABA) national meet in 2006. In 2006, at the ACBL NABC meet in Chicago, he won the Mini-Spingold II teams-of-four, another tournament for players with no more than 1500 masterpoints. His team was runner-up the previous year.
