= Tieman =

Tieman is a name of Dutch origin, a variant spelling of the name Tiedeman which again is a variant spelling of the name Tiedemann. Notable people with the name include:

- Brian Tieman, astronomer who confirmed the existence of SN 2010lt with John B. Newman in 2011
- Bron Tieman, programmer and lyricist for Little Bitch
- Dan Tieman, basketball player
- James Tieman, runner-up in the 1990 Non-Life Master Swiss Teams
- Johan Tieman, navigator of KLM Flight 633
- Joshua Tieman, a poker player
- Robert Tieman, Dutch politician
- Tiéman Hubert Coulibaly, the Minister of Foreign Affairs and International Cooperation in Council of Ministers of Mali from 2012 on
- Will Tieman, owner of WGHN
