= Ruriko Yoshida =

Japanese-American mathematician

- Education: University of California, Berkeley; University of California, Davis
- Scientific career
- Workplaces: Naval Postgraduate School; Duke University, University of Kentucky
- Academic advisors: Jesús A. De Loera

Ruriko (Rudy) Yoshida is a Japanese-American mathematician and statistician whose research topics have ranged from abstract mathematical problems in algebraic combinatorics to optimized camera placement in sensor networks and the phylogenomics of fungi. She works at the Naval Postgraduate School in Monterey, California as a professor of operations research. She was promoted to the rank of professor on July 1, 2023.

== Early life and education ==
Yoshida grew up in Japan. Despite a love of mathematics that began in middle school, she was discouraged from studying mathematics by her teachers, and in response dropped out of her Japanese high school and took the high school equivalency examination instead. In order to continue her study of mathematics, she moved to the US, and after studying at a junior college, transferred to the University of California, Berkeley. Her parents, who had been supporting her financially, stopped their support when they learned that she was studying mathematics instead of business, and she put herself through school working both as a grader in the mathematics department and in the university's police department. She graduated with a bachelor's degree in mathematics in 2000.

She went to the University of California, Davis for graduate study, under the supervision of Jesús A. De Loera. De Loera had been a student of Berkeley professor Bernd Sturmfels, and Yoshida also considers Sturmfels to be an academic mentor. Part of her work there involved implementing a method of Alexander Barvinok for counting integer points in convex polyhedra by decomposing the input into cones, and her 2004 dissertation was Barvinok's Rational Functions: Algorithms and Applications to Optimization, Statistics, and Algebra.

== Career ==
After completing her doctorate, Yoshida returned to the University of California, Berkeley as a postdoctoral researcher, working with Lior Pachter in the Center for Pure and Applied Mathematics, and attended Duke University for more postdoctoral research as an assistant research professor of mathematics, working with Mark L. Huber.

Yoshida became an assistant professor of statistics at the University of Kentucky in 2006, and was promoted to a tenured associate professor in 2012. In 2016 she moved to her present position at the Naval Postgraduate School, moving there to be closer to her husband's family in California. She has also returned to Japan as a visitor to the Institute of Statistical Mathematics. She is also known as an accomplished teacher of mathematics and statistics as is testified by the provost's announcement and the list of her students.
