= North American Collegiate Bridge Championship =

Bridge competition

North American Collegiate Bridge Championships are an intramural college competition run by the American Contract Bridge League. The finals are held every summer in conjunction with the North American Bridge Championships. Any college in the United States, Canada, Mexico and/or Bermuda is eligible to participate in the event. Teams must consist of four to six players all from the same college.

== Competition ==
The first North American College Team Championship was held in 1987 at the Spring NABC in St. Louis and the winners (except Barry Goren, who was not eligible because of his age) represented ACBL in the first World Junior Championships in the Netherlands. Guy Doherty, Jon Heller and Asya Kamsky—joined by Bill Hsieh and Aaron Silverstein—finished third in the World Junior championships.

The championships were played at the Spring NABCs from 1988 to 1990. In 1990, after Harvard had won by what is still the largest margin in the history of the event, the competition was moved to ACBL headquarters in Memphis where it was co-sponsored by ACBL and the Association of College Unions-International. The competition moved back to the Spring NABC in 1991 but the following year, it returned to Memphis, where it became part of the annual Memphis in May activities.

The event was cancelled after the 1996 championships. Between 1997 and 2001, OKBridge and ACBL teamed up to sponsor the Internet College Team Championships. In 2000, the Collegiate Championships were reinstated and held at the Summer NABC in Toronto in 2001. It was cancelled in 2002 and reinstated in 2003.

The competition changed in 2006, with two parts of competition. Teams would play in a one-day online qualifier in January. The format was a bracketed round robin, with the top number of teams from each bracket, up to 8 total, qualifying to the finals. Players received lodging, airfare and spending money to attend. The finals were a two-day competition that took place at the summer North American Bridge Championship. The first day consisted of a complete round robin, with the top four teams qualifying to the second day. The second day was a semi-final and final bracketed knockout. The winning team received a $2,000 scholarship.

In 2014, the competition format changed. Rather than a one-day online qualifier in January, colleges were assigned two head-to-head online matches each month starting in October and concluding in March. Teams would accumulate victory points based on the results of each head-to-head match. The two teams with the highest victory points at the end of December earned the first two qualifying positions. The two teams with the highest victory points at the end of March earned the next two qualifying positions. Four teams total qualified for the two-day championship. Players received lodging, airfare and spending money to attend. The first day was a full-day semi-final round, with the second day being a full-day final round. The winning team received a $20,000 scholarship.

In 2018, the championship was opened to all teams with no qualification required, with the online spring tournaments awarding only travel packages to the top finishers. In 2020, the championship was cancelled along with the Summer NABC due to COVID-19, though an unofficial online championship was held. In 2021, an official tournament was held on Bridge Base Online as part of the Summer NAOBC.

== Championship winners ==
City	Year	University	Players	Final Match Score	Runner-up	Players	2nd Runner-up	Players
St. Louis, MO	1987	New York University	Guy Doherty, Barry Goren, Jon Heller, Asya Kamsky					
Buffalo, NY	1988	University of Illinois, Urbana-Champaign	Brian Blackmore, Dennis Carney, Justin Graver, Michael Steigmann					
Reno, NV	1989	University of Tennessee	Jim Baker, Mike Cappelletti Jr., Michael White, David Williams					
Fort Worth, TX	1990	Harvard University	Bill Cole, Michael Mitzenmacher, Franco Basseggio, James Colen					
Atlantic City, NJ	1991	University of Virginia	John Miller, John Prince, Hank Strauch, Scott Tumperi					
Memphis, TN	1992	Rensselaer Polytechnic Institute	Scott Bieber, Brady Richter, Andrew Skolnick, Ron Sperber					
Memphis, TN	1993	Yale University	Matt Hastings, Douglas Koltenuk, Malik Madon-Ismail, Tony Tang					
Memphis, TN	1994	Harvard University	Mark Paltrowitz, Barry Piafsky, Michael Steigmann, Tom Rozinski					
Memphis, TN	1995	Stanford University	Steve Altus, Scott Benson, Bert Hackney, Joel Singer					
Memphis, TN	1996	Texas A&M	Hank Eng, Eric Wolff, Patricia Lozano, Marc Whinery					
OKbridge	1997	Harvard University (mixed)	Barry Piafsky, Shawn Samuel, Jenni Hartsman, Joel Singer					
OKbridge	1998	University of Kentucky	Daniel Neill, Gilbert Busby, Ali Vaezy, Todd Anderson					
OKbridge	1999	University of California, San Diego	Eugene Hung, Jeremy Martin, Dan Harting, Michael Davis, Richard Wang					
OKbridge	2000	University of Technology - Vienna, Austria						
OKbridge	2001	mixed	Li-Chung Chen (Harvard), Andrew Cotton (Harvard), Quixiang Sun (Stanford), Theodore Hwa (Stanford), Jason Woolever (MIT)					
Toronto, ON	2001	University of California, San Diego	Eugene Hung, Graham Hazel, Cameron Parker, Sriram Ramabhadran					
Cancelled	2002							
Long Beach, CA	2003	Stanford University	Samuel Ieong, Ho-Lin Chen, Joon Pahk, Eric Mayefsky					
New York City	2004	MIT	Ljudmila Kamenova, Jason Chiu, John Hopkinson, Kevin Chu					
Atlanta, GA	2005	Yale University	Marc Glickman, Christina Craige, Randall Rubinstein, Jonathan Bittner					
Dallas, TX	2006	University of Michigan	Kevin Fay, Ilya Podolyako, Jeremy Vosko, Jonathan Zimbler					
Nashville, TN	2007	University of California, Los Angeles	Jeffrey Schrader, Blake Haas, Jason Chu, Barry Ko					
Las Vegas, NV	2008	California Institute of Technology	Roger Lee, Chien-Yao Tseng, Hsi-Chun Liu, Cheng William Hong					
Washington, D.C.	2009	Stanford University	Eric Mayefsky, Zizhuo Wang, Elena Grewal, Alex Lovejoy					
New Orleans, LA	2010	University of Pennsylvania	Kendrick Chow, Zhuo Wang, Naijia Guo, Zhiyi Huang					
Toronto, ON	2011	University of Pennsylvania	Kendrick Chow, Zhuo Wang, Naijia Guo, Xi Chen					
Philadelphia, PA	2012	University of North Carolina	Patrick Domico, Ovunc Yilmaz, Jinsheng Zhou, Xiyuan Ge					
Atlanta, GA	2013	University of Washington	Ben Bomber, Greg Herman, Daniel Poore, Lee Holstein					
Las Vegas, NV	2014	University of California, Berkeley	Armin Askari, Rebecca Wernis, Isha Thapa, Raymond von Mizener					
Chicago, IL	2015	University of Chicago	Oren Kriegel, Julian Manasse-Boetani, Kelly Mao, Ruth Ng, Alexander Okamoto					
Washington, D.C.	2016	University of Illinois, Urbana-Champaign	Peter Yeh, Yewen Fan, Bradley Sevcik, Ziyang Liu		University of California, Berkeley			
Toronto, ON	2017	Georgia Institute of Technology	Arjun Dhir, Santhosh Karnik, Charles Wang, Zhuangdi Xu	80-37	University of Chicago			
Atlanta, GA	2018	University of California, Berkeley	Chengwei Li, Kevin Rosenberg, Mingyang Zhou, Xinchen Zhu, Armin Askari	78-37	Georgia Institute of Technology	Cyrus Hettle, Richard Jeng, Santhosh Karnik, Arjun Dhir, Zhuangdi Xu		
Las Vegas, NV	2019	University of California, Berkeley	Stella Wan, Kevin Rosenberg, Jess Chao, Foster Tom, Armin Askari	78-57	University of Chicago	Cynthia Huang, Ilan Wolff, Raphael Hallerman, Zihan Tan, Zhengyan Fang		
Bridge Base Online (Unofficial)	2020	University of California, Santa Barbara	Andrew Rowberg, Philip Tian, Danning Lu, Nicholas Adamski, Ian Banta, Aaron Maharry, David McCarthy, Michael Zheng	106-102	The Claremont Colleges (mixed)	Jake Williams (Harvey Mudd College), Emma Kolesnik (Scripps College), Elke Kiva (Scripps College), Nick Koskelo (Harvey Mudd College), Luke Williams (Pomona College)		
Bridge Base Online	2021	Georgia Institute of Technology	Cyrus Hettle, Santhosh Karnik, Sean McNally, Shengding Sun, Zhuangdi Xu, Bo Han Zhu		Princeton University	Nathan Finkle, Sam Berman, Aaron Balleisen, Yi Zhao, Sihui Dai		
Providence, RI	2022	University of Chicago	Cynthia Huang, Ilan Wolff, Zihan Tan, Raphael Hallerman	54-24	Washington University in St. Louis	Rohan Srivastava, Henry Shuster, Lucas Strammello, Jinhao Zhao		
Chicago, IL	2023	Georgia Institute of Technology	Vincent Zhu, Bo Han Zhu, Weilong Shen, Alan Yu	70-59	Carnegie Mellon University	Mingkuan Xu, Daniel Weiss, Alec Sun, Gan Yang		
Toronto, ON	2024	Georgia Institute of Technology	Weilong Shen, Alan Yu, Kyle Rockoff, Alan Yeung	32-14 (1st vs 2nd), 25-32 (1st vs 3rd), 43-14 (2nd vs 3rd)	University of Chicago	Ziheng Yun, Zhiyu Cheng, Sarik Goyal, Alec Sun	University of Waterloo	Olivia Laufer, Max Cheng, Martin Zhao, John Dong
Philadelphia, PA	2025	Princeton University	Katherine Hwang, Tianyang Chen, Zhouzhou Gu, Zhao Yu Ma, Yitao Chen		University of California, Berkeley	Jonathan Yue, Weichen Tang, Zhenling Wang, Mihir Singhal, Ethan Xie	New York University	Yanlai Yang, Zihan Wang, Ava Donnellan, Margot Donnellan
Minneapolis, MN	2026	University of California, Berkeley	Zhenling Wang, Weichen Tang, Mihir Singhal, Ethan Xie	94-21	Georgia Institute of Technology	Justin Shiao, Alex Han, Lior Weber, Chase Lefevre		

== Participating colleges ==
College	Year(s) Won
Brandeis University	
Brown University	
California Institute of Technology	2008
Carleton College	
Claremont McKenna College	
College of William & Mary	
Columbia University	
Cornell University	
Dalhousie University	
Dartmouth College	
Davidson College	
Georgia Institute of Technology	2017, 2021, 2023, 2024
Hamilton College	
Harvard University	1990, 1994, 1997
Harvey Mudd College	
McGill University	
Massachusetts Institute of Technology	2004
Northwestern University	
New York University	1987
Ohio State University	
Princeton University	2025
Rensselaer Polytechnic Institute	1992
Stanford University	1995, 2003, 2009
Swarthmore College	1977
Texas A&M University	1996
University of California, Los Angeles	2007
University of California, Berkeley	2014, 2018, 2019, 2026
University of California, San Diego	1999, 2001
University of Chicago	2015, 2022
University of Kentucky	1998
University of Illinois, Urbana-Champaign	1988, 2016
University of Maryland, College Park	
University of Michigan	2006
University of Minnesota	
University of North Carolina, Chapel Hill	2012
University of North Texas	
University of Oklahoma	
University of Pennsylvania	2010, 2011
University of Technology - Vienna, Austria	2000
University of Tennessee	1989
University of Texas at Austin	
University of Toronto	
University of Virginia	1991
University of Washington	2013
Washington University in St. Louis	
Whitman College	
Yale University	1993, 2005 (Overtime win)
