= Wagar =

Wagar may refer to:

- Kirk Wagar (born 1969), American former Ambassador to Singapore
- Kurtis Wagar (born 1985), Canadian retired lacrosse goaltender
- Margaret Wagar (1902–1990), American bridge player
  - Wagar Women's Knockout Teams, a bridge competition
  - Wagar Women's Pairs, a bridge competition
- Mortimer Wagar (1857–1926), American banker and businessperson
- W. Warren Wagar (1932–2004), American historian
- Wagar High School, in Côte Saint-Luc, Quebec, Canada

== See also ==
- Trentway Wagar, intercity bus carrier in Ontario, Canada
