= GFHA =

GFHA could refer to:

- Georgia Field Hockey Association
- Greater Flint Hockey Association
- Hastings Airport (Sierra Leone) in Freetown, Sierra Leone (ICAO identifier: GFHA)
