= National 49er Pairs =

North American bridge championship

The National 49er Pairs national bridge championship was held at the spring American Contract Bridge League (ACBL) North American Bridge Championship (NABC).

The 49er Pairs was a matchpoint pairs event. The event typically started on the Wednesday of the NABC. It was restricted to those with fewer than 50 masterpoints.

== History ==
The National 49er Pairs was a one-day matchpoint event in which players competed for the Fifth Chair Trophy.

The first National 49er Pairs was held in 1997. Winners' names were added to the Fifth Chair Trophy. The Fifth Chair Foundation is an international non-profit organization dedicated to promoting bridge on the Internet and attracting new players to the game.

== Winners ==
Winners of National 49er Pairs
Year	Winners	Runners-Up
1998	Roberta Lyon, Jim Washburn	Marsh MacMillan, Lois MacMillan
1999	Linda C. Bell, Kristina Bohdanowicz	David Hooey, Kas Dykstra
2000	Daniel Taylor, Judith Hunt	Frank Paynter, Jo Anne Paynter
2001	Bill Nabors, John Balog	Wanda Brooks, Jim Rinck
2002	Brian Duran, Stephen McDevitt	John Redford, Tricia Bradford
2003	Paul Weintraub, Marilyn Weintraub	Barbara Albert, Judith Broder
2004	Candace Carlton, Terry Carlton	Kay Jenkins, Cary Jenkins
2005	James McKay, Hans Verveer	Bernie Weiss, Joan Dixon
2006	Eric Sieg, Jim Thompson	Nadine Barker, Suzie Herman
2007	Ann Gruver, Sara Fabick	James Carey, Eric Bardin

== Sources ==
- List of previous winners, Page 6. Daily Bulletin (PDF), vol. 50–6, March 14, 2007
- 2007 winners, Page 1. Daily Bulletin (PDF), vol. 50–7, March 15, 2007
