= Bruce LM–5000 Pairs =

American contract bridge competition

The David Bruce LM–5000 Pairs bridge event is held at the Summer American Contract Bridge League (ACBL) North American Bridge Championship. It is open to all players who have earned Life Master status up to 5,000 masterpoints. The event is held at the same time as the Von Zedtwitz Life Master Pairs (open to all Life Masters) and the Young LM-1500 Pairs event.

The trophy is named in honor of David Bruce, the first player to achieve Life Master status in the ACBL.

== Winners ==
Winners of David Bruce LM–5000 Pairs
Year	Winners	Runners-up
2003	Mark Bartusek, John Jones	Craig Zastera, Stanford Christie
2004	Henry Meyer, Brian Gunnell	Jane Dillenberg, Jerry Goldberg
2005	David Maidman, Marin Marinov	Will Engel, Jim Melville
2006	Mike Cassel, Andy Kaufman	Al Blinder, Craig Zastera
2007	Karl Hicks, Brian Alexander	Barry Purrington, Michael Cassel
2008	Steve Johnson, Mark Teaford	Daniel Lavee, Barbara McLendon
2009	Carolyne Fox, George Fox	Cindy Sealy, Owen Lynch
2010	Michael McNamara, Sylwia McNamara	Barry Falgout, Rusty Krauss
2011	Howard Engle, Mark Weisman	Sam Miller, Marc Passman
2012	Donald Caplin, Zachary Grossack	Jeff Ruben, Andrew Stayton
2013	Randy Thompson, Barry Spector	David Wakeman, Rita Wakeman
2014	Ronald Kay, Joe Houde	Robert Bernstein, Jay Barron
2015	Norman Schwartz, Richard Reitman	Kevin Bolan, Ron Beall
2016	Michael Smith, Susan Smith	H John Edmonds, Larry Kahn
From 2017 onward, the masterpoint limited was raised to 6000 masterpoints
2017	Daniel Bertrand, Allan Simon	H Hunt, Zachary Brescoll
2018	JJ Johnsen, Rick Gold	Jenny Lin, Aaron Jones
2019	Henri Farhi, Norman Schwartz	Philip Goulding, Robert Zimmermann
