= Red Ribbon Pairs =

National bridge championship

The Red Ribbon Pairs national bridge championship is held annually at the Summer American Contract Bridge League (ACBL) North American Bridge Championship (NABC). Prior to the 2015 Summer NABC, the Red Ribbon Pairs event was held at the Spring NABC.

The Red Ribbon Pairs is a four-session matchpoint (MP) pairs event with two qualifying and two final sessions. The event typically starts on the second Thursday of the NABC. The event is restricted to those with fewer than 3,000 masterpoints and have earned a red ribbon qualification.

== History ==
The Red Ribbon Pairs is an ACBL event with national rating open to players with fewer than 2500 masterpoints. Players earn qualification by placing first or second overall in regionally rated events of at least Flight B status. Neither member of a qualifying pair may hold more than 2500 masterpoints at the time of qualification.

The four-session event began in 1986. The first repeat winner occurred in 2007 when Paul Spear duplicated his win from 1998. The first repeat winning partnership occurred in 2016 when Paul Hattis and James Orleans won their second consecutive Red Ribbon Pairs Championship.

=== Bean Trophy ===
The Bean Trophy was designated by the ACBL Board of Directors in 1996 to honor Percy Bean, ACBL president in 1972 and chairman of the board in 1973.

Bean (1916–1992) represented District 19 on the Board from 1964 until 1988 and served as president of the ACBL Charity Foundation from 1974 until 1981. He was a member of the National Goodwill Committee and the National Board of Governors and general chairman of arrangements for the World Team Olympiad in Seattle in 1984. Bean was the editor of Mad, Mad World of Bridge, a publication that strongly championed players of less than expert class.

== Winners ==
Winners of Red Ribbon Pairs
Year	Winners	Runners-up
1986	Wayne Perrin, Martin Newland	Hugh Ogle, Charlie Cargile
1987	Jim Gaarder, Jimmy Ritzenberg	Charles Moser, Paul Bratton
1988	Leni Holtz, Guy Green	Anthony Trafecanty, Michael Trafecanty
1989	Lu Kohutiak, Yvonne Hernandez	2/3. Charlie Cargile, Warren Haynie; 2/3. Bill Goldberg, Bill McKenna
1990	Phil Gordon, Mike Grodsky	Rajendra Agarwal, Don Chilrud
1991	Dan Marthaler, Robert Johnstone	Steven Gaynor, Art Ardy Bakshian
1992	Duncan McCallum, Peter Peng	Andy Goodman, Steve Zolotow
1993	Ron Weinstock, John Gillette	Hank Meyer, Marty Graf
1994	T.C. Petty, Steve Altus	Grant Robinson, Joe Walden
1995	Marc Umeno, Hank Youngerman	Bernie Greenspan, Keith Sechler
Percy Bean Trophy inaugurated
1996	Vinay Sarin, Ringo Chung	Burton Lipsky, Arnold Goldstein
1997	Tony Miller, Diane Miller	Mark Bumgardner, Nagy Kamel
1998	Paul Spear, Jim Johnsen	David Halasi, Mike Nadler
1999	Jenni Hartsman, Andrew Rosenthal	Martin Hunter, Andy Stark
2000	Nie Wei Ping, Christopher Leung	David Yang, Xiaodong Shi
2001	Brandon Carpenter, LaToss Carpenter	Mike Nadler, Gurhun Baykal
2002	Rich Atwater, Chris Pesce	Bob Sievers, Georgia Heth
2003	Chi-Yen Lai, Bin Dai	Edward Leach, Bruce Schwaidelson
2004	Martin Harris, Jacob Morgan	Mark Brighouse, Harvinder Sidhu
2005	Yeong-Long Shiue, David Margolin	Jim Lyle, Robert Todd
2006	Chris Buchanan, B.J. Trelford	Everett Boyer, Mansoor Gowani
2007	Jack Hawthorne, Paul Spear	Jim Kehoe, Chuck Michalski
2008	Mike Develin, Li-Chung Chen	Sidney Kanter, Ron Nelken
2009	Daniel Jackson, Bill Gervais	Steven Towner, Mitch Towner
2010	Robert Levey, Jimmy Ritzenberg	George Dragich, Rosemary Dragich
2011	David Amsterdam, Brad Barry	Neil Cohen, Eric Goff
2012	Daniel Neill, Jason Rotenberg	Steve Hirsch, Gregory Thorpe
2013	Brian Cummins, Blake Sanders	Rich Brandenburg, Jeff Dater
2014	Mike Miedema, Ted Bain	Erli Zhou, Zhuo Wang
2015	Paul Hattis, James Orleans	Jesse Chao, Richard Wimberly
2016	Paul Hattis, James Orleans	Renee Shunta, Cameron Shunta
2017	Sudhir Patwardhan, Steve Overholt	Daniel Lev, Samuel Amer
2018	Michael Kelley, Martina Kelley	Richard Franklin, David Venetianer
2019	Roy Martin, Denny Cahan	Paul Hattis, James Orleans
2022	Jennifer Kuhn, Philip Kuhn	Paul Hattis, James Orleans
2023	Brandon Ge, Xin Ge	Sudhir Patwardhan, Steve Overholt
2024	Ryan Clark, Richard Piette	Nic Hristea, Mark Pinkowsky

== Sources ==
"ACBL - NABC Winners". acbl.com. ACBL. Archived from the original on 4 February 2012.

List of previous winners, Page 20 Daily Bulletin (PDF), vol. 52–7, March 19, 2009

2009 winners, Page 1 Daily Bulletin (PDF), vol. 52–9, March 21, 2009, archived from the original (PDF) on November 17, 2010
