= National 199er Pairs =

National bridge championship

The National 199er Pairs national bridge championship was held until 2013 at the summer American Contract Bridge League (ACBL) North American Bridge Championship (NABC).

The National 199er Pairs was a one-day, two-session matchpoint pairs event. The event typically started on the second Thursday of the NABC and was restricted to players with fewer than 200 masterpoints.

== Winners ==
Winners of National 199er Pairs
Year	Winners	Runners-Up
1995	Julie Horton, Steve Horton	
1998	John Javella, Madelyn Bachman	Parames Laosinchia, Ron Trimmer
1999	Mauro Viale, Tom Henry	Gail Himmelstein, Fran Bernstein
2000	Trevor Warren, Cobe Venner	Scott Gorsuch, Clinton Gorsuch
2001	Bernie Mayer, David Cohen	Jim Betts, Ross Holden
2002	Calvin Cobb, Chip King	Bob Sturm, Tom Marcelino
2003	Gus Haggstrom, Mitchell Tuller	Maureen Warman, Jessica Lai
2004	Matthew Bresler, Steve Winer	Larry Goldstein, David Katzman
2005	Ellen Cohen, Genny Whitaker	William Mauldin, David Banh
2006	Honor Mogul, Leonard Dubin	Jon Ullman, Don Recht
2007	Tom Graff, Roger Koeppe	Sean Gannon, Rick Gannon
2008	Terri Miladinovich, Mitch Miladinovich	Connie Jones, Mel Fineberg
2009	Kenneth Marshall, Roy Robson	Richard Malus, Nick Trobovic
2010	Jim Baker, Gwen Baker	
2011	William Sigward, George Trost	David Denomy, Allan Thomas
2012	Pedro Salom IV, Andrew Salom	Daniel Will, Henry Van Handle
2013	Susan Freund, Judy Harralson	Michael Heimann, Geoffrey Hadlock

== Sources ==
"ACBL - NABC Winners". acbl.com. ACBL. Archived from the original on February 4, 2012.

List of previous winners, Page 8 Daily Bulletin (PDF), vol. 80, July 24, 2008

2008 winners, Page 1 Daily Bulletin (PDF), vol. 80, July 25, 2008

Termination of event, page 12 Daily Bulletin (PDF), vol. 86, December 8, 2013
