= Young LM–1500 Pairs =

Bridge event

The Sally Young LM–1500 Pairs bridge event is held at the Summer American Contract Bridge League (ACBL) North American Bridge Championship. It is open to all players who have earned Life Master status up to 1,500 masterpoints. The event is held at the same time as the Von Zedtwitz Life Master Pairs (open to all Life Masters) and the Bruce LM-5000 Pairs event.

The trophy is named in honor of Sally Young (1906-1970), the first woman to achieve Life Master status in the ACBL (and #17 overall).

== Winners ==
Winners of Sally Young LM–1500 Pairs
Year	Winners	Runners-up
2003	Dick McCluer, Teresa Ozias	Kevin Perkins, Al Remer
2004	Robert Frick, Marvin Levine	Wieslaw Kalita, Marian Krasowski
2005	Edward Foran, Nicolas Hammond	Margaret Cooke, James Cooke
2006	Dan Swartzman, Rick Schoenfield	Matthew Bribitzer-Stull, Jason Bribitzer-Stull
2007	William Howard, Gregory Reichert	Matthew Dyer, Doug Anderson
2008	Mick Friedberg, Ken Llacera	Christopher Gibson, Paul Craviotto
2009	Peter Litchfield, Paul Gutterman	Steve Callaham, David Schulman
2010	William Anspach, Robert Block	L.C. Crowe, Joyce McMonagle
2011	Andrew Jeng, Richard Jeng	Michael Bodell, Belinda Gu
2012	Gregory Gorshkov, Neil Jaffe	Michael Gladfelter, Jane Gladfelter
2013	Doug Fjare, Alan Hierseman	Murat Berk, Peter van Zijl
2014	Douglas Grant, Charles Riffle	Sherman Gao, Andrew Collins
2015	Gregory Thorpe, Steve Hirsch	Bogumil Knypinski, Pawel Hanus
2016	Martha Welte, John Welte	Tsao-Tung Tsai, Ping Hu
From 2017 onward, the masterpoint limited was raised to 2500 masterpoints
2017	Tsao-Tung Tsai, Luen-Jyh Luo	Frank Swan, Jay Lucas
2018	Eric Gettleman, Paul Holmes	Jacob Freeman, Martin Zhao
2019	Ernie Schuler, Thomas Peters	Jacek Leznicki, Piotr Olszewski

== Sources ==
"ACBL - NABC Winners". acbl.com. ACBL. Archived from the original on February 4, 2012.

"ACBL - NABC Winners: Young Life Master Pairs (0-2500)". acbl.com. ACBL.

List of previous winners, Page 5 Daily Bulletin (PDF), vol. 81–1, July 24, 2009, archived from the original (PDF) on October 21, 2014

2009 winners, Page 1 Daily Bulletin (PDF), vol. 81–4, July 27, 2009, archived from the original (PDF) on January 31, 2015
