= Margie Cole =

American bridge player

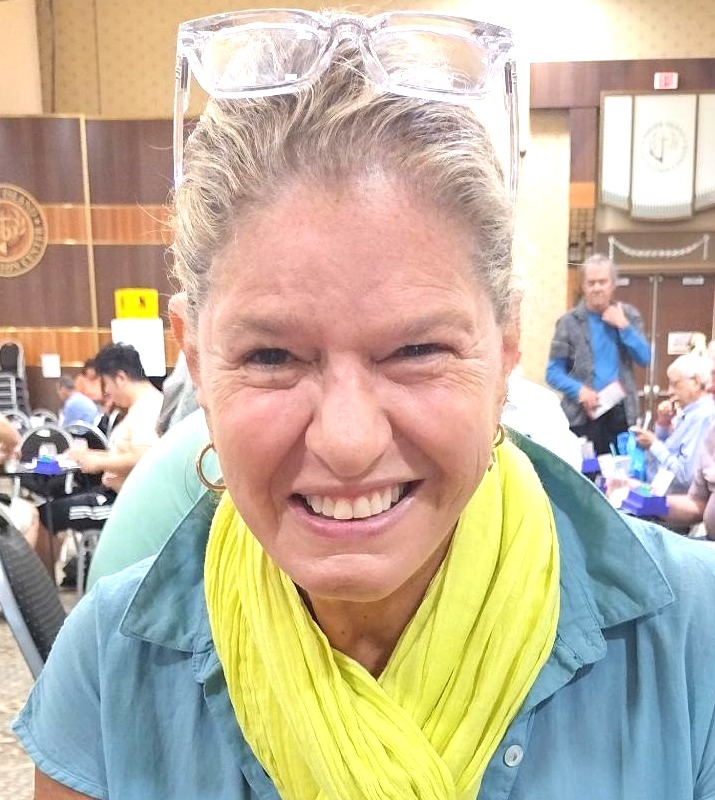
- Margie Cole
- Born: Margie Tucker

Margie Cole is an American North American champion bridge player. She won the Smith Life Master Women's Pairs in March 2022 playing with Migry Zur Campanile. She won the next North American Women's Pairs event, at the next North American Bridge Championship, the Wagar Women's Pairs in July 2022 playing with Sandra Rimstedt.

== Bridge accomplishments ==
=== Wins ===
- North American Bridge Championships (2)
  - Smith Life Master Women's Pairs (1) 2022
  - Wagar Women's Pairs (1) 2022

=== Runners-up ===
- North American Bridge Championships (1)
  - Mitchell Board-a-Match Teams (1) 2019
