= Mini-Spingold =

American bridge championship

Mini-Spingold national bridge championships are held at the summer American Contract Bridge League (ACBL) North American Bridge Championship (NABC). They were introduced in 2001 and are held at the same time as the main Spingold knockout team championship.

The Mini-Spingold comprises two simultaneous knockout team events. The Mini-Spingold I typically lasts 6 days(5 in 2013) with each day being a round consisting of two sessions of 28 boards. Since 2006 the Mini-Spingold II has been limited to 5 days, so teams may play two matches on the first day.

== Mini-Spingold I (0-5000) (before 2017) (0-6000) (starting 2017) ==
This event is restricted to those with less than 5,000 masterpoints. As of 2017, the masterpoint limit has been raised to 6000.

Winners of Mini-Spingold I (0-5000)
Year	City	Number of teams	Winners	Runners-up
2001	Toronto	72	Brian Johnston, John Lloyd, Bill Woodcock, Gary Whiteman, Brooke Nelles, Dale Freeman	Howard Gianera, Barry Purrington, Vernon Evans, Monte Evans, John Koch, Tony Ames
2002	Washington	63	Howard Einberg, Michael Mikyska, Alan Myerson, Jim Glickman, David Sokolow	John Hodges, Lynn Johannesen, Dale Johannesen, Franklin Lowenthal
2003	Long Beach	41	Barbara Wallace, Mark Yaeger, Lisa Kow, Rich Pavlicek Jr., Brian Gunnell	Marjorie Michelin, David Anding, Kenneth Titow, Ed Ulman, Andrew Vinock
2004	New York	40	Larry Mohr, Alex Hong, Shi Yan, Hao Ge, Yi Liu	Keith Connolly, Andrew de Sosa, Bob Rebelein, Morrie Kleinplatz
2005	Atlanta	51	Walt Murphy, Julie Murphy, Steve DeVico, Gayle Covey, Elliott Grubman, Ava Grubman	Richard Wegman, Arnold Malasky, Gloria Silverman Bart, Jim Russell
2006	Chicago	51	Martin Harris, Jacob Morgan, Jim Melville, Will Engel	Paul Stern, Daniel Levin, James O’Neil, Christopher Mansour
2007	Nashville	61	Brian Alexander, Karl Hicks, Jim Gordon, Mike Betts	Randy Okubo, Nathan Glasser, Bud Biswas, Susan Winkler
2008	Las Vegas	99	Joyce Hampton, Lukasz Lebioda, Jon Rice, Mike Rice, David Grainger	Warren Cederborg, Greg Michaels, Dayou Zhou, Stephen Tu
2009	Washington	59	Jay Whipple III, Kevin Dwyer, Owen Lien, Jon Rice, David Grainger	McKenzie Myers, Garth Yettick, Peggy Ware, Spencer Jones, Jon Brandon, Michael Sherman
2010	New Orleans	38	Morrie Kleinplatz, Mark Leonard, Robert Stayman, John Boyer	Jim Russell, Nancy Spear, Mark Jones, Stephen Stewart
2011	Toronto	62	John Lewis, David Sokolow, Howard Einberg, Maris Zilant, Susan Fuller, Saul Gross	Gary Donner, Deborah Murphy, Lauren Friedman, Larry Lerner
2012	Philadelphia	38	Yan Wang, Edward Xu, Peter Wong, Jianfeng Luo, Nongyu Li	George Krizel, Albert Shekhter, Oleg Rubinchik, Igor Milman
2013	Atlanta	29	Max Aeschbacher, Josh Parks, Arjun Dhir, Alex Dezieck	Randall Rubenstein, Marc Sylvester, Bill Begert, Doug Herron, Lorraine Cable, Doug Anderson
2014	Las Vegas	51	Mark Friedlander, Richard Fellars, Howard Engle, Mark Weisman	Wenbo Zhang, Jiawei Luo, Robert Hou, Yuan Chen
2015	Chicago	47	Steve Zolotow, Anam Tebha, Christian Jolly, Oren Kriegel, Sean Gannon	Jonathan Fleischmann, Xu Wang, Brad Dracka, Jin Hu, Jordan Kaye
2016	Washington	52	Edmund Wu, Jesse Chao, Alex Dezieck, Zhuo Wang	Robert Bernstein, Jay Barron, Doris Van Delft, Merel Bruijnsteen
2017	Toronto		John McWhinnie, Henry Caspar, Debbie Feldman, Doug Barnes, Terry Richardson, Christopher Cowan	Brad Bart, Detlef Ladewig, Terrence Rego, Andy Stark
2018	Atlanta		Neil Stern, James Weeks, Dorn Bishop, Jim Johnsen	David Shepler, Marsha Platnick, Brad Vander Zanden, Keith Hungate
2019	Las Vegas		Greg Michaels, Martin Harris, John Botzum, Miriam Harris-Botzum	Arti Bhargava, Ingi Agnarsson, Gudjon Sigurjonsson, Mark Leonard
2021	Online (Summer)		Eric Gettleman, Paul Holmes, Richard Franklin, David Venetianer, A.J. Stephani, Isaac Stephani	Charles Nemes, Edward Maier, David Bogolub, Rick Schoenfield
2022	Providence		Leon Yu, Winston Huang, Tsao-Tung Tsai, Bing Le	David Yoon, Lorraine Cable, Jordan, Lampe, Jacqueline Chang
2023	Chicago		Mark Kinzer, Martin Harris, Bob Marheine, Miriam Harris-Botzum	David Yoon, Ryan Connors, Marc Sylvester, Randi Adelman
2024	Toronto		Louis-Amaury Beauchet, Ana Kovacevic, Miroslav Kovacevic, Robert Ives	Stephane Turcotte, Bijoy Anand, Normand Houle, Janice Madsen
2025	Philadelphia		Mark Donovan, Ryan Connors, Randi Adelman, Shona Donovan	Jennifer Kuhn, Philip Kuhn, Charles Riffle, Douglas Grant

== Mini-Spingold II (0-1500) (before 2017), (0-2500) (2017-2024), Mini-Spingold (0-3000)(starting 2025) ==
This event is restricted to those with less than 1,500 masterpoints. In 2017, the masterpoint limit was raised to 2,500 masterpoints. In 2025, the masterpoint limit was raised to 3,000 masterpoints.

Winners of Mini-Spingold (0-1500)
Year	City	Number of teams	Winners	Runners-up
2001	Toronto	36	Bob Hollow, Motaz Farag, Jim Brickman, Bill Kertes, Leo Takefman, Irving Goodman	Larry Friedman, Jennifer Gianera, Jerry Poliquin, Larry Delefs, Ala Sobol, Mileva Jobin
2002	Washington	53	Bob Hollow, Motaz Farag, Gabriel Tawil, Theo Lichtenstein	Maeve Mahon, John Segal, Russell Friedman, Allan Wolf
2003	Long Beach	36	Matt Meckstroth, Rob Meckstroth, Rich Regan, James Hawkes, Andrew Hurd	Bruce Blakely, Fred Stout, Nancy Ferguson, David Bryant
2004	New York	32	Mark Teaford, Norton Rimer, Myron Rimer, Ronald Resnick	Doris Banks, Christine Woodring, Paul Lenoble, Lew Kroll
2005	Atlanta	34	Nancy Ferguson, David Bryant, Bruce Blakely, Dmitri Shabes	Nicolas Hammond, Martin Nathan, Maureen McGuire, Edward Foran, John Hassett, Robert Ternosky
2006	Chicago	43	Steve Callaham, John Hassett, Edward Foran, Nicolas Hammond	Eric Hendrickson, Richard Lawson, Matthew Bribitzer-Stull, Jason Bribitzer-Stull
2007	Nashville	41	Matt Meckstroth, Robert Glickman, Sam Katz, Daniel Goldfein	Owen Lien, Eric Mayefsky, Eric Sieg, David Coberly, Zach Brescoll, Mike Develin
2008	Las Vegas	45	Brian Duran, Gloria Tsoi, Lon Sunshine, Ivanie Yeo	John Scibelli, Thomas Shulman, Justine Hancock, Sali Ma
2009	Washington	61	Eric Hendrickson, Matthew Bribitzer-Stull, Jason Bribitzer-Stull, Andy Caranicas	Victor Hsu, Ted Wilson, Paul Fagan, Sandy Johnson
2010	New Orleans	27	Jennifer Gu, Adam Portley, Belinda Gu, Jonathan Pines	Steve Callaham, David Schulman, Patrick Corn, Megan Corn
2011	Toronto	31	Yuan Chen, Wenbo Zhang, Sam Yu, Kaiyu Qian	Jean La Traverse, Josette Levesque, Richard Collette, Sylvie Levesque
2012	Philadelphia	30	Max Glick, Zach Scherr, Jin Hu, Zach Wasserman, Jonathan Fleischmann	Claude Le Feuvre, Perry Poole, Stan Weiner, Ping Hu
2013	Atlanta	23	Buddy Landis, John Felker, Stephanie Felker, Rick Whitehead	Barbara Newman, Don Turner, Hannah Tidman, Yaron Schweizer
2014	Las Vegas	33	Om Chokriwala, Fred Upton, Kevin Lane, Steve Ramos, Jr	Mary Ose, Gary Ansok, Arti Bhargava, Todd Werby
2015	Chicago	23	Hunter McClain, Benjamin Kompa, Xiyuan Ge, Kenneth Ramaley	Kenneth Hopke, Jerry Nolte, Elizabeth Nolte, Phil Feldman
2016	Washington	29	Curt Kristensen, Gregory Sellgren, Ti Davis, Brian Rink	Winston Chang, Joe Albert Garcia, Wayne Gorski, Frank Lin, Kenny Pan
2017	Toronto	40	Tsao-Tung Tsai, Luen-Jyh Luo, Edward So, Jack Uppal	Kerry Cotterell Bruce Williams, Curt Kristensen, Howard Montemurro
2018	Atlanta	20	Jim Liu, Tsao-Tung Tsai, Xuhua Lin, Leon Yu	Liu Xiang, Zhengwen Li, Yike Xie, Yuxuan Chen, Liang Min
2019	Las Vegas	21	Jordan Lampe, Jacqueline Chang, Christopher Moh, Siqing Yu	Scott Nason, Jeff Dater, Nancy Heck, Alexander Wiles
2020	Online (Fall)	36	Kyle Rockoff, Daniel Weiss, Gan Yang, Derek Wong, Sarik Goyal, Ben Fisk	Xin Ge, Sarah Chen, Serena Guo, Wanwan Ren, Brandon Ge, Brent Xiao
2021	Online (Spring)	40	Howard Booth, Paul Hattis, James Orleans, David Edelson, Steven Fox	Wanwan Ren, Serena Guo, Jung Hu, Qing Lu
2021	Online (Summer)	24	James Dahlberg, Alan Munro, Colin Schloss, Nick Migliacci	Brian Zhang, Eric Xiao, Serena Guo, Wanwan Ren, Victor Xiao, Jeff Xiao
2022	Providence		Denny Cahan, Alexander Woo, Guy Martin, Roy Martin	Rachael Gosling, Gertrude Barker, Stephan Juliusburger, John F W Glynn
2023	Chicago		Jeffery Schwartz, Catherine Williams, Daniel Lev, Michael Xu, Sharon Phillips, Susan Davison	Henry Shi, Zhiqiang Hu, Li Miao, Ping Hu
2024	Toronto		Andrew Lazarus, Elenalani Lam, Charles Riffle, Douglas Grant	Patrick Thompson, Jill Plasteras, Richard Augmann, Madeleine Tremblay
2025	Philadelphia	20	Justin Young, Jason Grove, Jackson Wahl, Sarah Wahl	George Mansour, John Altman, Richard Krauland, Russell Poppleton, Huang-Chia Chang

== Sources ==
List of previous winners, Page 7 Daily Bulletin (PDF), vol. 80–4, July 21, 2008, archived from the original (PDF) on April 2, 2015

2008 Mini-Spingold II winners, Page 1 Daily Bulletin (PDF), vol. 80–9, July 26, 2008

2008 Mini-Spingold I winners, Page 1 Daily Bulletin (PDF), vol. 80, July 28, 2008, archived from the original (PDF) on April 11, 2014

2009 Mini-Spingold II results, Page 16 Daily Bulletin (PDF), vol. 81, August 1, 2009

2009 Mini-Spingold I results, Page 10 Daily Bulletin (PDF), vol. 81, August 2, 2009

Page 3, District 8 Advocate (PDF), December 2005

2010 Mini-Spingold I results, Page 12 Daily Bulletin, vol. 82, August 1, 2010, archived from the original (PDF) on July 13, 2012

2011 Mini-Spingold I results, Page 16 Daily Bulletin (PDF), vol. 83, July 31, 2011, archived from the original (PDF) on July 22, 2012

2011 Mini-Spingold II results, Page 18 Daily Bulletin (PDF), vol. 83, July 30, 2011, archived from the original (PDF) on July 22, 2012
