= National 99er Pairs =

National bridge championship

The National 99er Pairs national bridge championship was held at the fall American Contract Bridge League (ACBL) North American Bridge Championship (NABC) until discontinued in 2013. The National 99er Pairs was a one-day two-session matchpoint pairs event, restricted to players with under 100 masterpoints and typically started on the second Friday of the NABC.

== Winners ==
Winners of National 99er Pairs
Year	Winners	Runners-Up
1998	1/2: Larry Pack, Rick Wollner; 1/2: Carol Robertson, Eileen Schrampf	
1999	Jason Woolever, Qixiang Sun	Ross Richardson, Daniel Lawrence
2000	Eileen Aronovitch, Martin Aronovitch	Richard Weinberg, Jane Stockard
2001	Tom Morton, Bob Quinlan	Carl Bowman, Marilyn Bowman
2002	Jeff Kaldem, MaryBelle Hoenig	Robert Lumbert, Jocelyn Krug
2003	David Copi, Sam Copi	Jane Murtishaw, Howard Lindsey
2004	Ray Wise, Janet Kay	Kim Gilman, Kathy Gilman
2005	Kathy Rolfe, Eric Rolfe	Ronald Bunnell, Barbara Bunnell
2006	Shen Wan, Yihan Xiong	Douglas Neel, Catherine Hess
2007	Rebecca Anspach, Nicholas Erpelding	Philip Scatena, Carl Sutherland
2008	Stephen Drodge, Andrew Rodriguez	Sandra Naber, John Naber
2009	Malvina Aljure, Elsa Castillo	Bruce Hanson, Barbara Hanson
2010	Pat Grams, Chuck Grams	2/3: Suzanne Batt, Kathleen Smith; 2/3: Will Sutherland, Ann Sutherland
2011	Frank Houmiel, Shirley Roman	Ray Lepp, Penny Lepp
2012	John Craig, Thomas Blean	Peggy Christianson, Stephen Gryte
2013	Edith Heath, Dianne Trees	Donna Hendrix, Pat Linville

== Sources ==
"ACBL - NABC Winners". acbl.com. ACBL. Archived from the original on 4 February 2012.

1998 winners, Page 11 Daily Bulletin (PDF), vol. 72–9, November 28, 1998

1999 winners, Page 7 Daily Bulletin (PDF), vol. 73–9, November 27, 1999

2000 winners, Page 6 Daily Bulletin (PDF), vol. 74–10, November 26, 2000

2001 winners, Page 1 Daily Bulletin (PDF), vol. 75–7, November 25, 2001

2002 winners, Page 1 Daily Bulletin (PDF), vol. 76–9, December 7, 2002

2003 winners, Page 1 Daily Bulletin (PDF), vol. 77–9, November 29, 2003

2004 winners, Page 1 Daily Bulletin (PDF), vol. 78–9, November 27, 2004

2005 winners, Page 1 Daily Bulletin (PDF), vol. 79–9, November 26, 2005

2006 winners, Page 1 Daily Bulletin (PDF), vol. 79–9, November 25, 2006

2007 winners, Page 1 Daily Bulletin (PDF), vol. 80–8, November 30, 2007

2008 winners, Page 1 Daily Bulletin (PDF), vol. 81–9, November 29, 2008
