= Mini-Blue Ribbon Pairs =

North American bridge championship

The Mini-Blue Ribbon Pairs North American bridge championship is held at the Fall American Contract Bridge League (ACBL) North American Bridge Championship (NABC).

The Mini-Blue Ribbon Pairs is a six-session matchpoint pairs event with two qualifying sessions and two final sessions. The event typically starts on the first Tuesday of the Fall NABC. The event is restricted to players with fewer than 6,000 masterpoints who have earned a Blue Ribbon qualification.

== History ==
The inaugural Mini-Blue Ribbon Pairs was held in 2005 at the Fall NABC in Denver. There is a pre-qualification requirement: players must have earned a Blue Ribbon qualification to participate. This is done by placing first or second in certain competitions.

== Winners ==
Winners of Mini-Blue Ribbon Pairs
Year	Winners	Runners-up
2005	Marty Harris, Jacob Morgan	Frank Wharton, Paul Walker
2006	Joe Houde, Divakar Bhargava	John Klayman, Lawrence Lau
2007	Patricia Menefee, Andre De Leon	Metin Gokcen, Sadik Arf
2008	Roger Coffman, Chris Coffman	Arne Maki, Gene Maki
2009	Harold Huffaker, Ronald Huffaker	Gerrie Owen, Leonard Schaen
2010	Mark Jones, Doug Levene	Dean Panagopoulos, Yiji Starr
2011	Susan Fulton, John Hogan	William Grant, Andrew Loh
2012	Peter Worby, Kevin Young	Vic Quiros, Harvinder Sidhu
2013	Suman Agarwal, Harjinder Ajmani	Terry Schleppegrell, Marion Kelly
2014	Ina Demme, Bill Kertes	David MacRae, Christina van Leeuwen
2015	Grant Robinson, Teresa Boyd	Om Chokriwala, Joan Rubin
2016	Radu Nistor, Joan Brody	Michael Schrage, Edward Rauch
2017	Juan Castillo, Saul Gross	Margie Cole, Leonardo Fruscoloni
2018	Virgil Massey, Charlene Sands	Barry Margolin, Mark Krusemeyer

== Sources ==
"ACBL - NABC Winners". acbl.com. ACBL.

"ACBL Live" acbl.org. ACBL. Retrieved 1 August 2019.

List of previous winners, Page 9 Daily Bulletin (PDF), vol. 81–5, November 25, 2008, archived from the original (PDF) on December 3, 2008

2008 winners, Page 1 Daily Bulletin (PDF), vol. 81–7, November 27, 2008
