= Life Master =

Life Master may refer to:

- an American Contract Bridge League title
- a United States Chess Federation title
