= Introduction to Tropical Geometry =

Mathematics textbook

- First edition
- Author: Diane Maclagan, Bernd Sturmfels
- Language: English
- Series: Graduate Studies in Mathematics
- Genre: Mathematics
- Publisher: American Mathematical Society
- Publication date: 2015

Introduction to Tropical Geometry is a book on tropical geometry, by Diane Maclagan and Bernd Sturmfels. It was published by the American Mathematical Society in 2015 as volume 161 of Graduate Studies in Mathematics.

== Topics ==
The tropical semiring is an algebraic structure on the real numbers in which addition takes the usual place of multiplication, and minimization takes the usual place of addition. This combination of the two operations of addition and minimization comes up naturally, for instance, in the shortest path problem, where concatenating paths causes their distances to be added and where the shortest of two parallel paths is the one with minimum length, and where some shortest path algorithms can be interpreted as tropical matrix multiplication. Tropical geometry applies the machinery of algebraic geometry to this system by defining polynomials using addition and minimization in place of multiplication and addition (yielding piecewise linear functions), and studying the "roots" of these polynomials, the breakpoints where they fail to be linear. The field is named after the Brazilian adopted home of one of its pioneering researchers, Imre Simon. Although past work in the area has studied it through methods of enumerative combinatorics, this book instead is centered around explicit calculations related to the tropicalization of classical varieties. Although it is much more comprehensive than the two previous introductory books in this area by Itenberg et al., some topics in tropical geometry are (deliberately) omitted, including enumerative geometry and mirror symmetry.

The book has six chapters. It first introduces the subject and gives an overview of some important result, after which the second chapter provides background material on non-Archimedean ordered fields, algebraic varieties, convex polytopes, and Gröbner bases. Chapter three concerns tropical varieties, defined in several different ways, correspondences between classical varieties and their tropicalizations, the "Fundamental Theorem of Tropical Geometry" proving that these definitions are equivalent, and tropical intersection theory. Chapter four studies tropical connections to the Grassmannian, neighbor joining in the space of metric trees, and matroids. Chapter five considers tropical analogues of some of the important concepts in linear algebra, and chapter six connects tropical varieties to toric varieties and polyhedral geometry.

== Audience and reception ==
This book is written as a textbook, with problems testing readers' understanding of the material. Reviewer Patrick Popescu-Pampu claims that even though it is a graduate-level book series, undergraduates with a sufficient background in algebraic geometry should be able to access it. Reviewer Felipe Zaldivar writes that it "makes the subject accessible and enjoyable" and makes "a beautiful addition" to its book series. Reviewer Michael Joswig concludes that Introduction to Tropical Geometry "will become a standard reference in the field for years to come".
