= Manfield Non-Life Master Pairs =

North American bridge (card game) competition

The Manfield Non-Life Master Pairs national bridge championship is held at the fall American Contract Bridge League (ACBL) North American Bridge Championship (NABC).

The Manfield Non-Life Master Pairs is either a two or four session MP pairs event depending on the number of entrants. If it is a four session event, there are two qualifying sessions and two final sessions. The event typically starts on the first Friday of the NABC. The event is restricted to those that have not attained the rank of Life Master.

== History ==
The event was introduced in 1981 as the Miles Non-Life Master Pairs, named after Rufus L. "Skinny" Miles Jr. It was renamed in 2010 after ACBL Hall of Fame member Ed Manfield.

== Winners ==
Winners of Non-Life Master Pairs
Year	Winners	Runners-up
1981	Lin Goldstein, Shirlee Shaw	Ray Kuntz, Alex Stagner
1982	Paul Bratton, Robert Bernhard	Yale Mallinger, G. LeBlanc
1983	Moses Ma, Philips Santosa	Wally Weaver, Michael Lewis
1984	Summer Steinfeldt, Nancy Muehter	Albert Rahmey, Jeanne Rahmey
1985	Hank Hristienko, Zbigniew Radwanski	Linda Hendrickson, Wendy Haisley
1986	Lanier Hurdle, Mike Hurdle	John Diamond, Andy Chesterton
1987	Anthony Trafecanty, Michael Trafecanty	David Marx, Judy Levi
1988	Sharon Tuggle, Tom Tuggle	Steve Clements, Nicholas Rogers
1989	Jay Berke, Thomas Halton	Charles Carpenter, Edward Crane
1990	Metin Uz, Jeffrey Naiman	Anlin Xu, Huichun Zhao
1991	Daryl Hicks, Charles Papp	Sakiko Naito, Toru Amano
1992	Cordelia Menges, Audrey Robb	Millie Huneycutt, Stuart Perlman
1993	Bob Ehrlich, Clark Millikan	Jordan Lampe, Kingsum Chow
1994	Jean-Cheui Hsung, Edmund Chen	Tom Knier, Jon Weinberg
1995	Michael McNamara, David Liss	Dayn Beam, Jim Alison
1996	Adam Barron, Anthony Hurwitz	Rupert Brauch, Brian Kemper
1997	Alan Carpenter, Michael Levin	Gregory Berry, Jay Segal
1998	John Markey, John Cobb	Andy Muenz, Bob Zehm
1999	Aviv Shahaf, Igor Sauchenko	Andy Latto, Lawrence Latto
2000	Ernie Fusco, Sherry Fusco	Andrew Rieger, Michael Albert
2001	Aaron Craig, Max Minzner	Bill Filip, Warren Williams
2002	Edward Wilson, Paul Fagan	Dale Shepherd, Sumit Daftuar
2003	Marie Berggren, Gunnar Gothberg	John Bondurant, Paul Horn
2004	Jadwiga Polujan, Bernie Weiss	William Thorp, Dorothy Conway
2005	Mike Develin, John Barth	Cassandra Spain, Karen Gurwitz
2006	Robert Bertoni, William Nason	Nevena Stoimirov, Ivan Stoimirov
2007	Metin Gokcen, Sadik Arf	Kevin Shiue, Dan Joo
2008	Debbie Crisfield, Karen Haines	Lunhui Lin, Dawei Qi
2009	Stephen Drodge, Dan Emmons	Sandra Naber, John Naber
2010	Roger Pryor, Dianne Pryor	Brandon Harper, Ryan Miller
2011	Monica Guo, Kevin Shiue	Karen Dahners, Marilyn Vitkevich-Wilk
2012	Jacob Vrooman, Yuan Shen	Umesh Reghuram, Puliur Santhanam

== Sources ==
"ACBL - NABC Winners". acbl.com. ACBL. Archived from the original on 4 February 2012.

List of previous winners, Page 7 Daily Bulletin (PDF), vol. 81–1, November 21, 2008

2008 winners, Page 1 Daily Bulletin (PDF), vol. 81–2, November 22, 2008

Renaming, Page 4 Daily Bulletin (PDF), vol. 82, 26 November 2010
