= Cynthia Vinzant =

American mathematician

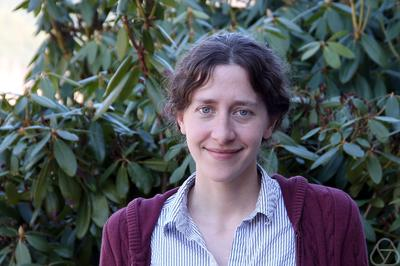
Vinzant at the Oberwolfach Research Institute for Mathematics in 2017

Cynthia Vinzant is an American mathematician specializing in real algebraic geometry; her research has also involved algebraic combinatorics, matroid theory, Hermitian matrices, and spectrahedra in convex optimization. She is a professor of mathematics at the University of Washington.

== Education and career ==
Vinzant is a 2007 graduate of Oberlin College in Ohio, where she studied mathematics and neuroscience. She completed her Ph.D. in mathematics in 2011 at the University of California, Berkeley, with the dissertation Real Algebraic Geometry in Convex Optimization supervised by Bernd Sturmfels.

After working as a Hildebrandt Assistant Professor at the University of Michigan and as a postdoctoral researcher at the Simons Institute for the Theory of Computing in Berkeley, Vinzant obtained a tenure-track assistant professor position at North Carolina State University in 2015. She moved to the University of Washington in 2021 and was promoted to associate professor in 2023.

== Recognition ==
In 2020, Vinzant was named as a Sloan Research Fellow in mathematics and as a von Neumann Fellow at the Institute for Advanced Study. She was elected as a Fellow of the American Mathematical Society in the 2024 class of fellows. Vinzant and colleagues will receive the 2025 Michael and Sheila Held Prize from the National Academy of Sciences.
