= Diane Maclagan =

Professor of mathematics

- Education: University of Canterbury
- Known for: Introduction to Tropical Geometry
- Scientific career
- Doctoral advisor: Bernd Sturmfels

Diane Margaret Maclagan (born 1974) is a professor of mathematics at the University of Warwick. She is a researcher in combinatorial and computational commutative algebra and algebraic geometry, with an emphasis on toric varieties, Hilbert schemes, and tropical geometry.

== Education and career ==
As a student at Burnside High School in Christchurch, New Zealand, Maclagan competed in the International Mathematical Olympiad in 1990 and 1991, earning a bronze medal in 1991. As an undergraduate, she studied at the University of Canterbury, graduating in 1995. She did her PhD at the University of California, Berkeley, graduating in 2000. Her dissertation, Structures on Sets of Monomial Ideals, was supervised by Bernd Sturmfels.

After postdoctoral research at the Institute for Advanced Study, Maclagan was a Szegő Assistant Professor at Stanford University from 2001 to 2004, an assistant professor at Rutgers University from 2004 to 2007, then an associate professor there from 2007 to 2009. She moved to her present position at the University of Warwick in 2007.

== Books ==
With Bernd Sturmfels, Maclagan is the author of the book Introduction to Tropical Geometry. With Rekha R. Thomas, Sara Faridi, Leah Gold, A. V. Jayanthan, Amit Khetan, and Tony Puthenpurakal, she is the author of Computational Algebra and Combinatorics of Toric Ideals.
