= Mini-Vanderbilt (10K) Knockout Teams =

The Mini-Vanderbilt or "10K Knockout Teams" national bridge championship is held at the Spring American Contract Bridge League (ACBL) North American Bridge Championship (NABC).

The 10K Knockout Teams is a fixed three-day event. Half-day 28 board matches are played until such time as the field can play 56-board matches and complete the event in three days. This event is open to teams of four, five, or six members who must be ACBL Members with fewer than 10,000 masterpoints.

== History ==
The inaugural 10K Knockout teams was held at the 2014 Spring NABC in Dallas, Texas.

== Winners ==
[North American] Mini-Vanderbilt 10K Knockout Teams, 2014 to present
Year	Winners	Runners-up
2014	Peggy Ware, Spencer Jones, Garth Yettick, Robert Todd	Meyer Kotkin, Kelley Hwang, Corey Krantz, Eric Robinson, Michael McNamara, Sylwia McNamara
2015	Ray Jotcham, Morrie Kleinplatz, Stephen Mackay, Jonathan Fleischmann, Ned Irving, Donald Rumelhart	Yauheni Siutsau, William Higgins, Sean Gannon, Blake Sanders
2016	Mark Jones, Stephen Stewart, Vladislav Isporski, James Melville	Leon Fisher, Mac Busby, Paul Darin, Sam Madison-Jammal
2017	Alan Daniels, Ellen Kent, Viktor Anikovich, Igor Milman, David Pelka, Robert Kent	Michael Ranis, Jim McKeown, Michael Wolf, Lee Bukstel, Donald Dalpe, Albert Shrive
2018	Michael Ranis, Saul Gross, Donald Dalpe, Albert Shrive, Anthony Barre, Juan Castillo	Alan Daniels, Ellen Kent, Viktor Anikovich, David Pelka, Robert Kent
2019	Louis Glasthal, Michael Massimilla, Robert Lass, Tom Fogarty	David Bogolub, Rick Schoenfield, Charles Nemes, Michael Gibson
2020	Competition not held (COVID-19)	Competition not held (COVID-19)
2021	Competition not held (COVID-19)	Competition not held (COVID-19)
2022	Kyle Rockoff, Sarik Goyal, Victor Xiao, Eric Xiao, Jeff Xiao	Michael Ranis, Carlos Hoyos, Michael Wolf, Lee Bukstel
2023	James Fox, Judy Fox, Maximo Crusizio, Rodrigo Garcia Da Rosa	Jane McLaughlin, Ethan Wood, Sibrand Van Oosten, Barbara Shukov, Stefan Thorpe
2024	John Hinton, Tom Bishel, John Bishel, Rajagopal Sriraman	Michael Botwin, Barry Plotkin, Rusty Krauss, David Rodney
2025	Kyle Rockoff, Ron Vickery, Stephen Tu, Ron Powell	Zheng Zhang, Yan Wang, Michael Wang, Shihong You

== Sources ==
- "Search Results: 10K Knockout Teams". 2014to present. ACBL. Visit "NABC Winners"; select a Spring NABC. Retrieved 2019-08-05.
