= Mike Develin =

American mathematician

Michael Lee Develin
- Born: August 27, 1980 (age 46); Hobart, Tasmania
- Education: Harvard University; University of California, Berkeley
- Scientific career
- Fields: Mathematics
- Workplaces: D. E. Shaw & Co. Facebook
- Doctoral advisor: Bernd Sturmfels

Michael Lee Develin (born August 27, 1980) is an American mathematician known for his work in combinatorics and discrete geometry.

== Early life ==
Mike Develin was born in Hobart, Tasmania. He moved to the United States with his Korean mother, living in New York City. He attended Stuyvesant High School, where he was captain of the math team, and entered Harvard University at the age of 16. At 22, he received his PhD from UC Berkeley, doing his dissertation on Topics in Discrete Geometry. He was awarded the 2003 American Institute of Mathematics five-year fellowship.

== Mathematics ==
Develin is a 2-time Putnam fellow in 1997 and 1998. He studied under advisor Bernd Sturmfels at UC-Berkeley, and has been noted for work on Stanley's reciprocity theorem and tight spans. His 2004 paper, "Tropical Convexity", with Sturmfels, is regarded as one of the seminal papers of tropical geometry, garnering over 300 citations to date.

== Facebook ==
Develin worked on data science for Facebook and Instagram from 2011 to 2018.

On January 23, 2014, Develin published a satirical note on behalf of Facebook's data science team, predicting the demise of Princeton University, in response to a research paper by Princeton PhD candidates predicting the demise of Facebook.

== Bridge ==
Develin started playing competitive bridge in 2005.

=== Wins ===
- Manfield Non-Life Master Pairs 2005
- Grand National Teams Flight B 2007
- South American Junior Championships 2007
- Red Ribbon Pairs 2008
- 0-10,000 Fast Pairs 2022

=== Runner-up ===
- North American Pairs Flight C 2006
- Mini-Spingold II 2007

== Personal life ==
Develin was naturalized as an American citizen in 2010.

Develin organized and maintains SimBase, a simulated baseball league with fictitious players, whose inaugural members also included Jeopardy! champion Joon Pahk.

Develin occasionally set up a "free advice" table near the San Francisco Ferry Building.

He currently resides in Kirkland, Washington and plans to visit all 63 US national parks.
