= Jesús A. De Loera =

Mexican-American mathematician

Jesús Antonio De Loera
- Born: January 18, 1966 (age 60); Mexico City
- Education: Cornell University
- Known for: Research in combinatorial optimization
- Awards: American Mathematical Society Fellow (2014); INFORMS Farkas Prize (2020)
- Scientific career
- Fields: Mathematics, Combinatorial Optimization
- Workplaces: University of California, Davis
- Doctoral advisor: Bernd Sturmfels
- Doctoral students: Ruriko Yoshida

Jesús Antonio De Loera (born January 18, 1966) is a Mexican-American mathematician at the University of California, Davis, specializing in discrete mathematics and discrete geometry.

== Education ==
De Loera did his undergraduate studies at the National Autonomous University of Mexico, earning a B.S. in mathematics in 1989. After earning a master's degree from Western Michigan University a year later, and another master's degree in 1993 from Cornell University, he finished his doctorate from Cornell in 1995 under the supervision of Bernd Sturmfels.

== Career ==
De Loera joined the UC Davis faculty as an assistant professor in 1998, and was promoted to full professor in 2005. He served on the scientific advisory board for the Institute for Computational and Experimental Research in Mathematics (ICERM) through 2021.

== Awards and honors ==
In 2014, he became a fellow of the American Mathematical Society "for contributions to discrete geometry and combinatorial optimization as well as for service to the profession, including mentoring and diversity". In 2019 he was named a SIAM Fellow "for contributions to discrete geometry and optimization, polynomial algebra, and mathematical software". In 2020 he received the INFORMS optimization society's Farkas Prize "in recognition of his pioneering work at the intersection of discrete mathematics, optimization and algebraic geometry". He delivered an invited plenary address at the 2021 National Math Festival. In 2021, he was elected vice president of the AMS.
