= Joan Brody =

American bridge player

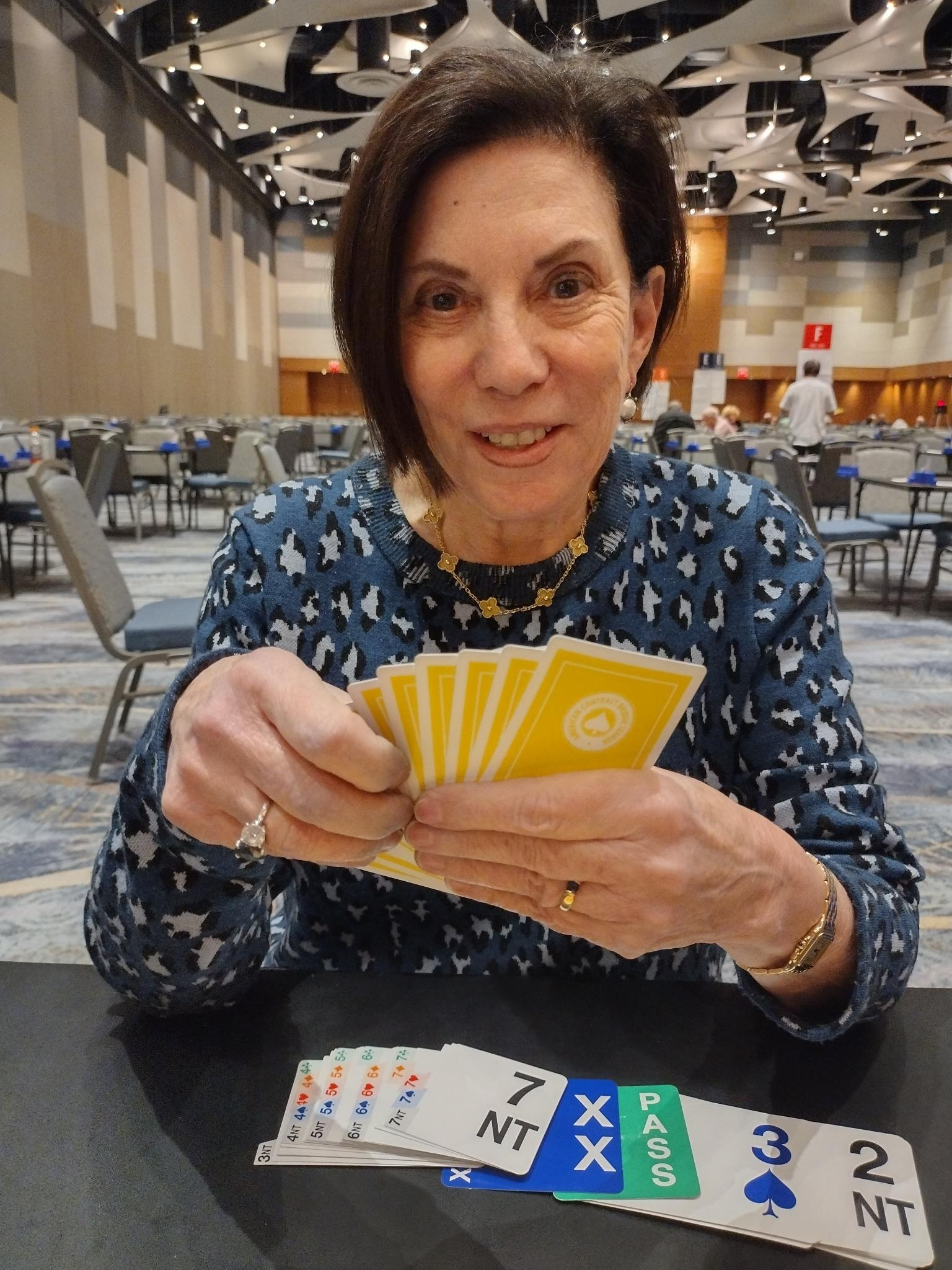
Brody in 2022

Joan Brody is an American World Champion bridge player. She won the Women's Team event in Wrocław in 2022.

== Bridge accomplishments ==
=== Wins ===
- World Bridge Series Women Teams (1) 2022

== Personal life ==
Brody lives in Livingston, New Jersey.
