= Non-Life Master Swiss Teams =

National bridge championship

The Non-Life Master Swiss Teams national bridge championship was held at the summer American Contract Bridge League (ACBL) North American Bridge Championship (NABC).

This was a Swiss Teams event limited to non-Life Masters.

== History ==
The winners have had their names engraved on the President's Cup, presented in 1942 by the then ACBL President Morgan Howard.

The cup was previously awarded to winners of the Non-Masters Pairs but was re-designated for the non-LM Swiss Teams by the ACBL Board of Directors in 1995.

== Winners ==
Winners of Non-Life Master Swiss Teams
Year	Winners	Runners-up
1982	Jay Feldman, Bill Carnes, David Rinehart, Gordon Grossetta, Norval Baran, Bill Brown	Donna Burtt, Ron Woodsum, Leonard Smith, John Shelley
1983	Ani Deshpande, Joel Guthmann, Dan Dennehy, Martha Benson	Rob Brown, Deborah Gattas, Jean Choi, Warren Fukushima
1984	Larry Lerner, David Grossman, Jackie Saltman, Brian Gunnell	Phil Articola, Harry Sapienza, Ken Harkness, Bill Anspach, Ben Brill, Paul McMullin
1985	Dorothy Shorts, John Shorts, Patricia Rasmus, Richard Rasmus	2-3. Dudley Hemphill, Phil Clayton, David Chyan, Bob Price; 2-3. Charles Hopkins, Tom Smith, Esfandiar Khazai, Jo Schachner, Barbara Barnett, Edie Eastman
1986	Walter Bell, David Kresge, Bob Klotz, John Dickenson	Michael Chelst, Ellen Klosson, Lois Tenkin, Bob Bell
1987	Elaine Pettius, Judy Beul, Jim Beul, Steve Albin	2-3. Frances Schminky, Jane Baker, George Perry, Helen Perry; 2-3. Michael Cheng, Ransone Price, John Diamond, David Cheng
1988	Andrew Moss, Amy Nellissen, Barry Margolius, Iain Abrahams	Chris Roberts, W. Aeschbacher, Candy Carlson, Roberto Scaramuzzi, David Marker, Mark Hunsaker
1989	Tom Gittings, Charles Sheaff, Lavern Wiebe, David Suplinski	Marcia Plonsker, Deanne Fox, Nancy Weil, Marilyn Kroll
1990	Wayne Oden, Daniel Jackson, Randy Paul, Larry Flowers	Thomas Courtney, David Pickering, Tommy Thompson, James Tieman
1991	Steve Wood, Linda Wood, Beverly Whitehorn, Gene Nobles	Karen Berkowitz, Richard Clayton, James Raiford, Darl Brooks, Alan Hayman, Ernest Campbell
1992	Dennis Hsu, Adam Weisz-Margulesku, Feng Lu, Xiadong Zhang	Darren Wolpert, Hazel Wolpert, M. Salamone, Sam Yoga
1993	Douglas Crispell, Nicholas Straguzzi, Robert Browne, Paul Gorman	Michael Veve, Curtis Lending, Robert Zier, James Witting, Stephen Bunning
1994	Fred Nickerson, Joan Nickerson, Corey Cole, Richard Aronson	Andy Clough, Daniel Hugh-Jones, Rufeng Li, Chaoming Zhang
1995	Jim Strachan, Ken Trock, Jeff Rubenstein, Jack Brauner	Marlon Mundt, Andrew Cohen, Harvey Jaffe, Michael Kerr
1996	Dan Webster, Kristin Orians, Kelvin Raywood, Hing Kong Ho	2-3. David Moss, Kevin Casey, John Galatti, Andrew Rosenthal; 2-3. Zongyi Li, Feng Xiao, Li Ping Wang, Mei Jin
1997	Paul Perkowski, Denis Murphy, Bonnie Bagley, John Ledet	Peter Grenier, Frank Bischoff, Lynn Wood, Wanda Blankenship

== Sources ==
List of previous winners, Page 8 Daily Bulletin (PDF), vol. 69–2, July 26, 1997

1997 winners, Page 3 Daily Bulletin (PDF), vol. 69–3, July 27, 1997
