= Bridge Base Online =

American gaming company

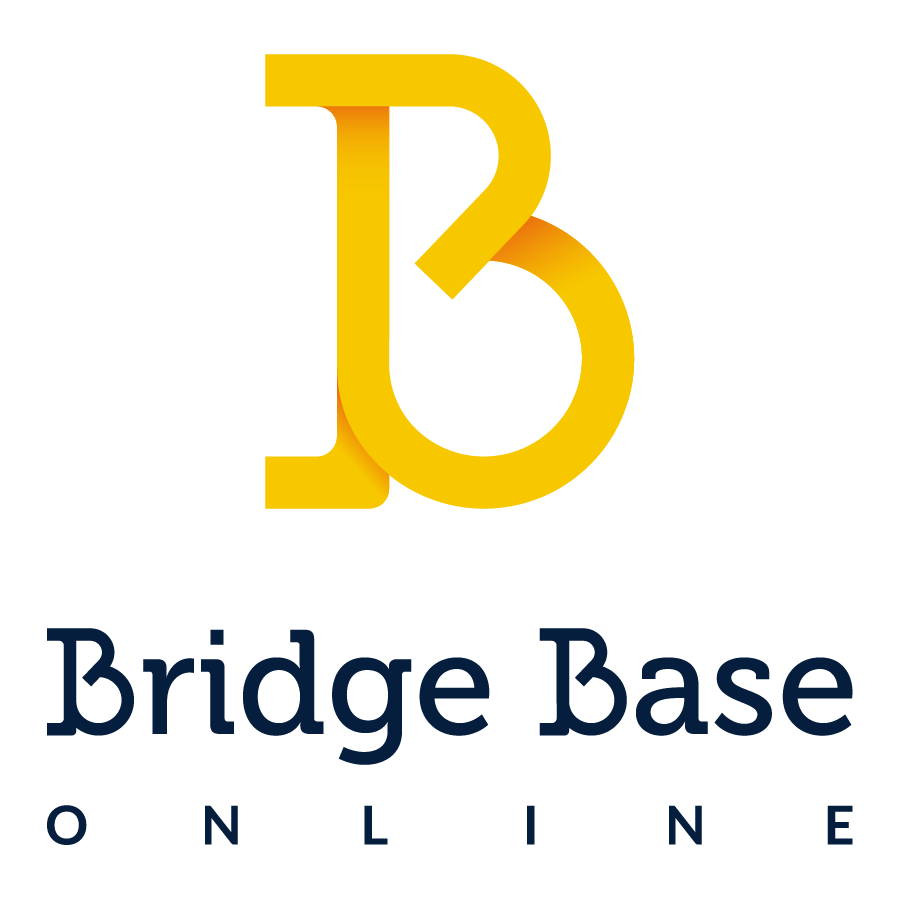
- Industry: Online games
- Website: bridgebase.com

Bridge Base Online (BBO) is the world's largest bridge-playing online platform, with about 11.6 million monthly visits as of September 2024.

== History ==
In 1990, Bridge Base was founded by Fred Gitelman and Sheri Winestock and released BASE II, an analytical tool for serious bridge players that ran on MS-DOS. In 1992, teaching software titled Bridge Master, was released for MS-DOS. In 1998, Bridge Master for Windows was released. Also in 1998, an online bridge offering in Microsoft Gaming Zone, later MSN Games, was supplied by Bridge Base.

Created by professional bridge player Fred Gitelman, BBO was first available from Bridge Base in 2001 as a Windows downloadable software offering free online multiplayer bridge rooms for practice and play. Around 2008, BBO was ported to a web application to also support Linux and macOS users, as well as mobile devices.

In 2018, Bridge Base Online was inducted into the American Contract Bridge League's Hall of Fame for its long-term commitment to bridge. As of February 2022, BBO was the only organization ever inducted by the Hall of Fame.

As of August 19th 2026, Bridge Base Online has separated its membership into three tiers: Basic, Basic No Ads, and Premium. Free and No-Ads tiers are limited to playing six boards a day, while Premium members are not limited.

== Main features ==
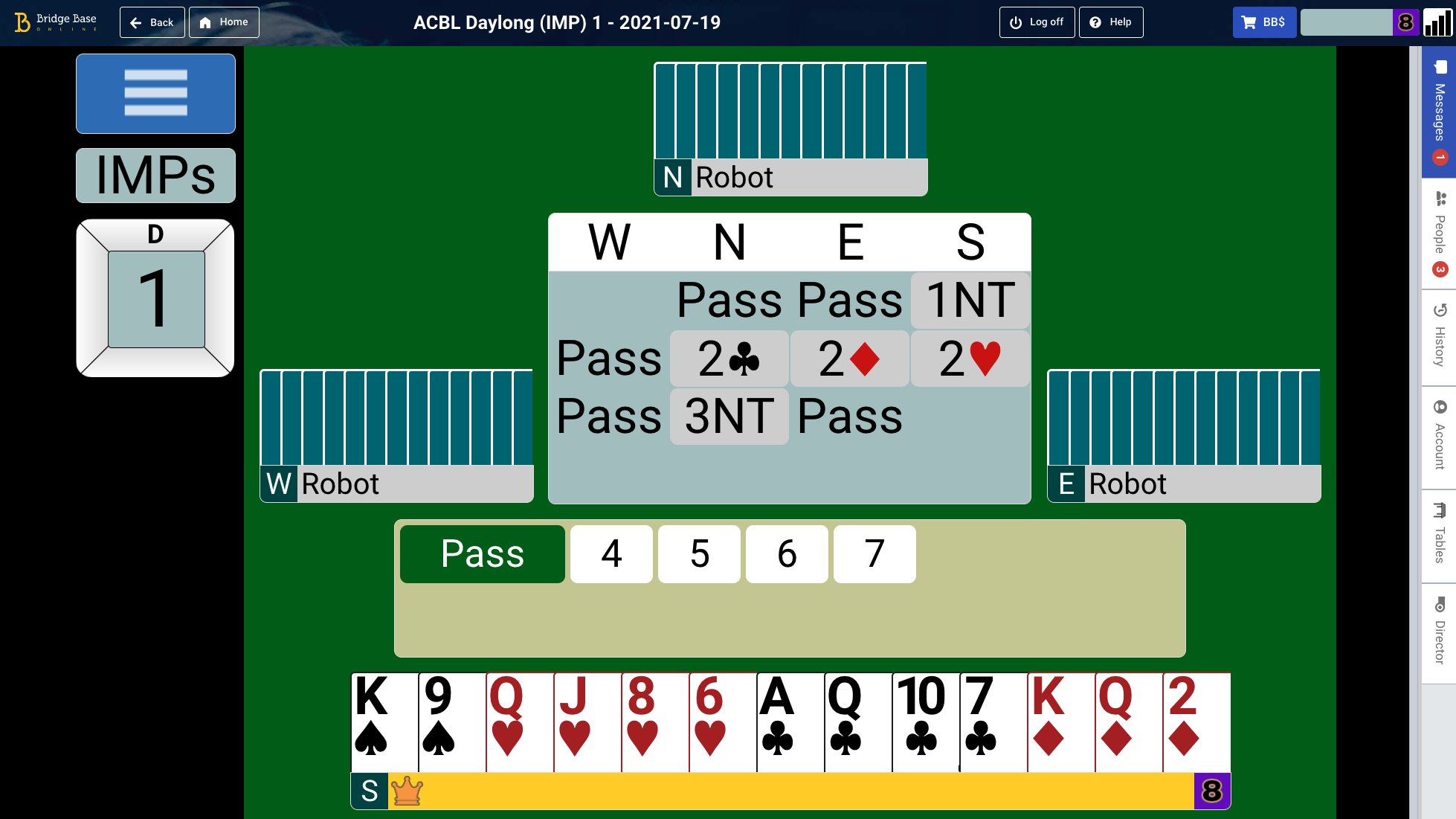
BBO web app

In addition to bridge rooms for casual play and teaching, BBO hosts many types of duplicate bridge tournaments, including events sanctioned by official bridge organizations such as the American Contract Bridge League or the English Bridge Union, which award official masterpoints to players.

Bridge Base Online also features free tools that help novice players learn and improve their game skills, like 'Bridge Master' and 'Minibridge'. Partnerships can practice their bidding methods at Teaching Tables. Users can register at no cost. Many playing activities are also free, while premium tournaments charge an entry fee. Players may also rent robots for play practice.

A significant contribution to the game is the Vugraph "broadcasts", which presents live matches from around the world, enhanced by expert commentary. Because the language of bridge bidding and play uses only 15 words and all selections are done via mouse click, people who speak different languages can play together. BBO's interface supports many languages, and it allows players and "kibitzers" to chat, mainly using a text-based interface, at tables and other virtual rooms. Records of hands played are archived and are publicly accessible, enabling players to view their own and other competitors' actions.

== Robots in BBO ==
BBO also offers playing robots, which allow users to practice or compete without human partners and/or opponents, even in high-end competitive events. An example is the "NABC Robot Individual", a 3-day duplicate tournament where about 2000 players compete for an ACBL national title while partnering with robots. The main BBO robot is also known as Ginsberg's Intelligent Bridge player (GIB). GIB is an artificial intelligence bridge player. It can be rented on BBO. It plays the 2/1 game forcing system and can be used to fill in for one or more players or to provide advice.

For players who want to practice extensively, BBO offers a subscription ("BBO+") that allows a choice of robots that play different bidding systems.

== American Contract Bridge League ==
In partnership with the American Contract Bridge League (ACBL), Bridge Base Online sponsors ACBL-sanctioned tournaments on its website. These tournaments award ACBL masterpoints©. Masterpoints awarded for online play can be combined with other types of ACBL masterpoints, which helps players achieve higher ACBL ranks.

During the COVID-19 pandemic, BBO partnered with ACBL and The Common Game to initiate an online platform named ACBL Virtual Clubs. This grew significantly during the pandemic by allowing duplicate bridge clubs to hold their games via an online platform, with most of the game fees going to the clubs. Collusive cheating, which is very easy on BBO and all but impossible to prove except through statistical means, became a significant issue during this period. In response, the ACBL announced it was joining forces with the EDGAR foundation and BBO, effective February 1, 2024.

== Browser add-ons and extensions ==
Several browser add-ons have been developed to enhance the functionality of BBO. These include BBO Helper (double dummy display and many other features), BBOAlert (for remembering and automatically alerting complex system agreements), BBO Extractor (PBN and CSV download of boards), and BBO Visual Assist (for the visually impaired).
