= Wagar Women's Pairs =

The Wagar Women's Pairs North American bridge championship is held at the summer American Contract Bridge League (ACBL) North American Bridge Championship (NABC).

The Wagar Women's Pairs started in 2017 when it replaced the Wagar Women's Knockout Teams was dropped from the schedule. The event is restricted to female players.

== Winners ==
Women's Pairs, 2017 to present
Year	Winners	Runners-up
2017	Julie Smith, Susan Humphries	Linda Perlman, Debra Eaves
2018	Sondra Schubiner, Linda Wynston	Sharon Goldman, Justyna Zmuda
2019	Bronia Jenkins, Benedicte Cronier	Gabrielle Sherman, Laura Dekkers
2020	Not held (Covid)	
2021	Not held (Covid)	
2022	Margie Cole, Sandra Rimstedt	Amy Casanova, Arti Bhargava
