= WGHN =

WGHN may refer to:

- WGHN (AM), a radio station on 1370 kHz licensed to Grand Haven, Michigan, United States.
- WGHN-FM, a radio station on 92.1 MHz licensed to Grand Haven.
