= Georgia Field Hockey Association =

Georgia Field Hockey Association (GFHA) promotes field hockey in Georgia, USA. It organizes a club hockey competition each year that attracts teams from around the world. The GFHA sends men's and women's teams to compete in tournaments around the country.

== History ==
The GFHA was started by Nicolas Hammond and Kelly Brown in February 1991. It started playing at local parks but now plays on artificial turf surfaces.

== Atlanta Cup ==
The annual Atlanta Cup has included teams from Barbados, Bermuda, Canada, England, Nigeria and Trinidad. The first Atlanta Cup was in 1993 and was sponsored by Dannon. From 1993 to 1996, the tournament was known as the Dannon Atlanta International Cup. There was no tournament from 1997 to 2000. From 2001 to 2004, the tournament was known as the Atlanta International Cup. Since 2005, it has been called the Atlanta Cup. There was no tournament in 2013 or 2014 as the field was being refurbished.

Atlanta Cup Winners
Year	Men's	Women's
1993	New York FHC	New York Temps
1994	New York FHC	New York Players
1995	New York FHC	New York Players
1996	New York FHC	New York Players
2001	Washington Mavericks	Atlanta Peaches
2002	Houston FHC	Lady Mavericks
2003	Mavericks	Lady Mavericks
2004	Bermuda HA	Speckled Hens (Atlanta)
2005	Combermere (Barbados)	Lady Mavericks
2006	Chicago FHC	Chicago FHC
2007	Toronto Lions Jnr. FHC	Lucky Dragons
2008	Toronto Lions. FHC	Miami FHC
2009	Toronto Lions Jnr. FHC	Team Philly
2010	Bermuda Polecats	Florida United
2011	Bermuda Polecats	Miami FHC
2012	Tampa Bay Grasshoppers	Chicago FHC
2013	No tournament	No tournament
2014	No tournament	No tournament
2015	Miami Surf	Miami Surf
2016	Balwashers (Baltimore and Washington)	Atlanta
2017	Tampa Bay Grasshoppers	Atlanta
2018	Carolina	Atlanta
2019	New York Islanders	New York Islanders
2020	Cancelled	Cancelled
