= Bernd Sturmfels =

German American mathematician

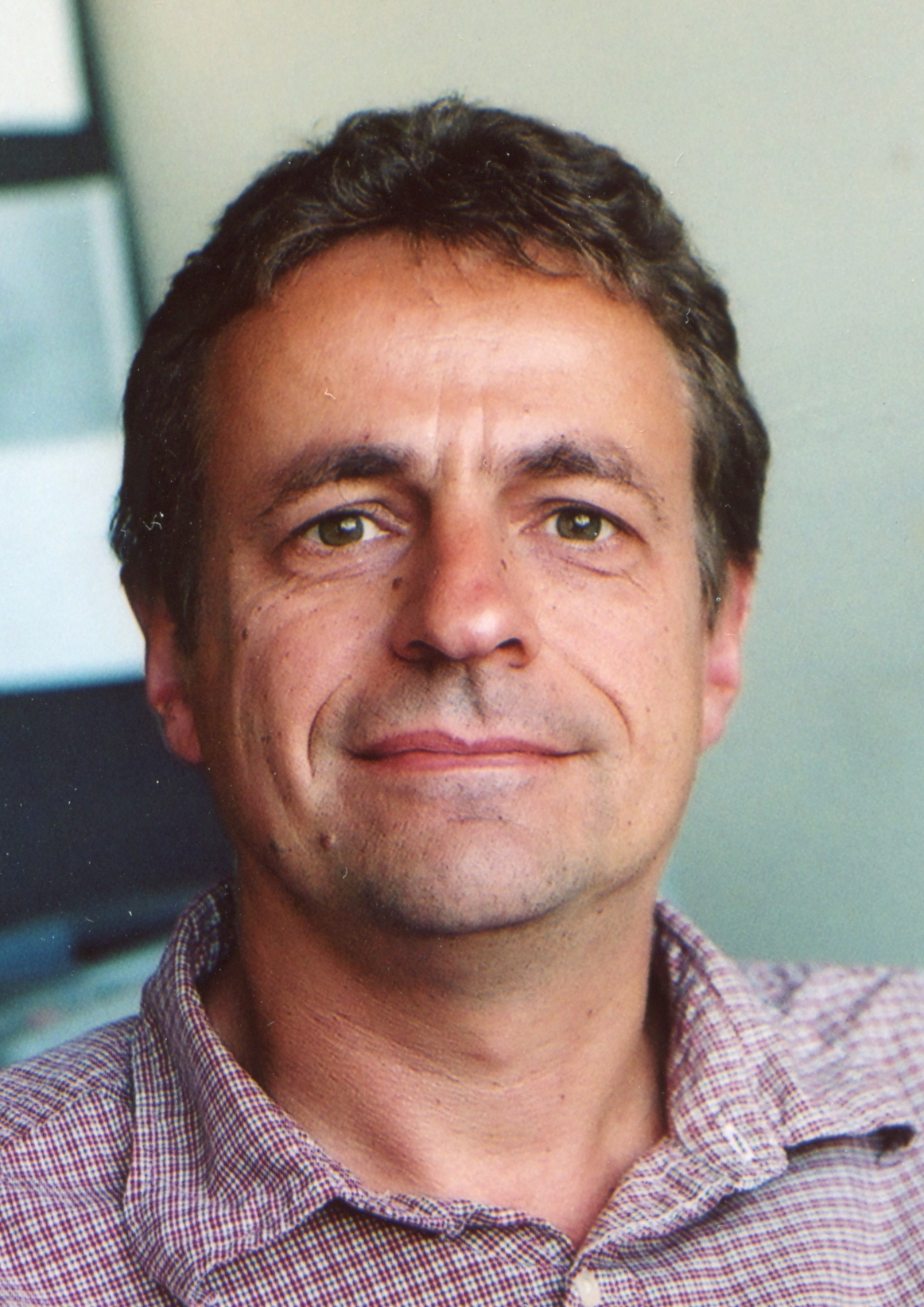
- Bernd Sturmfels (2005)
- Born: March 28, 1962 (age 64); Kassel, West Germany
- Education: Darmstadt University of Technology; University of Washington
- Scientific career
- Institutions: Research Institute for Symbolic Computation; Cornell University; University of California, Berkeley; Max Planck Institute for Mathematics in the Sciences
- Thesis: Oriented Matroids and Combinatorial Convex Geometry; Computational Synthetic Geometry
- Doctoral advisor: Jürgen Bokowski; Victor Klee
- Doctoral students: Melody Chan; Jesús A. De Loera; Mike Develin; Diane Maclagan; Rekha R. Thomas; Caroline Uhler; Cynthia Vinzant
- Website: math.berkeley.edu/~bernd

Bernd Sturmfels (born March 28, 1962) is a professor of mathematics and computer science at the University of California, Berkeley and is a director of the Max Planck Institute for Mathematics in the Sciences in Leipzig since 2017.

== Education and career ==
He received his PhD in 1987 from the University of Washington and the Technische Universität Darmstadt. After two postdoctoral years at the Institute for Mathematics and its Applications in Minneapolis, Minnesota, and the Research Institute for Symbolic Computation in Linz, Austria, he taught at Cornell University, before joining University of California, Berkeley in 1995. His Ph.D. students include Melody Chan, Jesús A. De Loera, Mike Develin, Diane Maclagan, Rekha R. Thomas, Caroline Uhler, and Cynthia Vinzant.

== Contributions ==
Bernd Sturmfels has made contributions to a variety of areas of mathematics, including algebraic geometry, commutative algebra, discrete geometry, Gröbner bases, toric varieties, tropical geometry, algebraic statistics, and computational biology. He has written several highly cited papers in algebra with Dave Bayer.

He has authored or co-authored multiple books including Introduction to Tropical Geometry with Diane Maclagan.

== Awards and honors ==
Sturmfels' honors include a National Young Investigator Fellowship, an Alfred P. Sloan Fellowship, and a David and Lucile Packard Fellowship. In 1999 he received a Lester R. Ford Award for his expository article Polynomial equations and convex polytopes. He was awarded a Miller Research Professorship at the University of California Berkeley for 2000–2001. In 2018, he was awarded the George David Birkhoff Prize in Applied Mathematics.

In 2012, he became a fellow of the American Mathematical Society.
