= North American Bridge Championships =

North American contract bridge tournaments

North American Bridge Championships (NABC) are three annual bridge tournaments sponsored by the American Contract Bridge League (ACBL). The "Spring", "Summer", and "Fall" NABCs are usually scheduled in March, July, and November for about eleven days. They comprise both championship and side contests of different kinds (e.g. matchpoint pairs and knockout teams, one-day and two-day) in many classes of competition (e.g. open/women/senior or defined by masterpoints). Host cities in the United States and Canada are selected several years in advance.

== Competitions and awards ==
=== Open team competitions – the premier events ===
Vanderbilt Cup

Awarded to the National Knock-out Team championship winners at the spring North American Bridge Championship (NABC)s. It was donated in 1928 by Harold S. Vanderbilt, who won in 1932 and 1940. The event was contested annually in New York as a separate championship until 1958, when it was incorporated into Spring NABCs.

Spingold Trophy

Awarded to the Master Teams championship winners at the summer North American Bridge Championship (NABC). Knockout Teams have been held since 1930, when players competed for the Asbury Park Trophy. In 1934, 1936 and 1937, there was a separate Masters Teams-of-Four event. The two events were merged in 1938 and renamed Spingold Master Knockout Teams. The trophy was donated by Nathan Spingold in 1934. Since 2001, there has also been a Mini-Spingold I (0–5000), restricted to those with less than 5,000 masterpoints, and a Mini-Spingold II (0–1500) ("Micro-Spingold") restricted to those with less than 1,500 masterpoints.

Reisinger Memorial Trophy

Awarded to the Open Board-a-Match Teams winners at the fall North American Bridge Championship (NABC), it was donated by the Greater New York Bridge Association in 1965 in memory of Curt H. Reisinger, a great benefactor and official of the ACBL, and replaced the Chicago Trophy. Reisinger teams is the only major team competition with board-a-match scoring. It is an open team event scored with two qualifying sessions, two semifinal sessions and two final sessions

Soloway Knockouts

Announced in fall 2017 to be inaugurated at the fall 2019 North American Bridge Championship (NABC), the Soloway championship will begin as a two-day Swiss teams after which the top 32 teams with their placement as their seed will enter a knockout tournament to determine the winners.

=== Other competitions, awards and trophies ===
Over the years the format of competition and masterpoint accumulation has changed. Accordingly, some trophies, originally awarded for particular achievements in specific categories, have been reassigned or retired. Below is a summary of past and current trophies at the national level.

- Baldwin Trophy – Awarded to the North American Pairs Flight A winners at the spring North American Bridge Championship (NABC).
- Baze Trophy – Awarded to the Senior Knockout Teams winners at the fall North American Bridge Championship (NABC).
- Bean Trophy – Awarded to the Red Ribbon Pairs winners at the summer North American Bridge Championship (NABC). Prior to 2015, the event was held at the spring NABC.
- Bruce Trophy – Awarded to the Bruce LM-5000 Pairs winners at the summer North American Bridge Championship (NABC).
- Cavendish Trophy – Since 1963, awarded to the Edgar Kaplan Blue Ribbon Pairs winners, now at the fall North American Bridge Championship (NABC); prior to that it was awarded to the National Open Pairs winner.
- Chicago Trophy – Currently awarded to the Mixed Board-a-Match Team winners, at the summer North American Bridge Championship (NABC). Donated by the Auction Bridge Club of Chicago in 1929, the trophy was originally awarded by the American Bridge League to the winners of the National Contract Championships Open Contract Team-of-Four (board-a-match scoring), which became the North American Open Teams Championship held by the American Contract Bridge League. In 1965, this historic trophy was replaced by the Reisinger Memorial Trophy and the Chicago Trophy began to be awarded to the winners of the Mixed Board-a-Match Teams.
- Barry Crane Top 500 – The masterpoint race which recognizes the 500 individual players who accumulate the most masterpoints in the calendar year. The winner of the race receives the McKenney Trophy.
- Fishbein Trophy – Awarded every year to the player winning the most masterpoints in the summer North American Bridge Championship (NABC).
- Goren Trophy – Awarded to the player winning the most masterpoints at the fall North American Bridge Championship (NABC). Prior to 2008, it was known as the Herman Trophy.
- Golder Cup – Awarded to the North American Pairs Flight B winners at the spring North American Bridge Championship (NABC).
- Herman Trophy – renamed the Goren Trophy.
- Jacoby Trophy – Awarded to the Open Swiss Teams winners; now at the spring North American Bridge Championship (NABC).
- Keohane Trophy – Awarded to the North American Swiss Teams winner at the fall North American Bridge Championship (NABC).
- Lebhar Trophy – Awarded to the IMP Pairs winners; now at the spring North American Bridge Championship (NABC).
- Leventritt Trophy – Awarded to the Silver Ribbon Pairs winners at the spring North American Bridge Championship (NABC).
- Machlin Trophy – Awarded to the Women's Swiss Teams winners at the spring North American Bridge Championship (NABC).
- McKenney Trophy – Awarded to the individual player who accumulates the most masterpoints in the calendar year – i.e. the winner of the Barry Crane Top 500 race.
- Manfield Trophy – Awarded to the Non-life Master Pairs winners at the fall North American Bridge Championship (NABC)
- Marcus Cup – Awarded to the Senior Masters open teams board-a-match winners from 1953 to 1967 at the summer nationals. Preceded by the Faber Cup from 1946 to 1952. Relegated as a secondary championship in 1968 and discontinued after 1978.
- Helen Sobel Smith Trophy – Awarded to the Life Master Women's Pairs winners, now at the fall North American Bridge Championship (NABC).
- Morehead Trophy – Awarded since 1973 to the winners of the Grand National Teams, a major team championship held at the summer North American Bridge Championship (NABC)s. Since 2001, it consisted of four flights. From 1967 to 1972, it had been awarded to the winners of a now defunct special knock-out team event that followed the Reisinger team contest at the fall NABCs.
- Mott-Smith Trophy – Awarded every year to the player winning the most masterpoints in the spring North American Bridge Championship (NABC).
- Nail Trophy – Awarded to the Life Master Open Pairs winners at the fall North American Bridge Championship (NABC).
- Norman Kay Platinum Pairs – Platinum Pairs event at the spring North American Bridge Championship (NABC).
- President's Cup – Awarded to the North American Pairs Flight C winners at the spring North American Bridge Championship (NABC).
- Richmond Trophy – Awarded annually to the Canadian who wins the most masterpoints during a calendar year.
- Rockwell Trophy – Awarded to the Mixed Pairs winners at the spring North American Bridge Championship (NABC).
- Silodor Trophy – Awarded to the winners of the Open Pairs I, now at the spring North American Bridge Championship (NABC).
- Sternberg Trophy – Awarded to the Women's Board-a-Match Teams winners at the fall North American Bridge Championship (NABC). Superseded the Coffin Trophy in 2001.
- Truscott Trophy – Awarded to the Senior Swiss Teams at the summer North American Bridge Championship (NABC).
- Von Zedtwitz Gold Cup- Awarded to the Life Master Pairs winners at the summer North American Bridge Championship (NABC)
- Wagar Trophy – Awarded to the Women's Knockout Teams at the summer North American Bridge Championship (NABC).
- Whitehead Trophy – Awarded to the Women's Pairs winners at the spring North American Bridge Championship (NABC) – .
- Wernher Trophy – Awarded to the winners of the Open Pairs II at the summer North American Bridge Championship (NABC).
- Young Trophy – Awarded to the Young LM-1500 Pairs winners at the summer North American Bridge Championship (NABC).

== North American Bridge Championships' seasonal itinerary ==
The following are the current general itineraries of the NABCs.

Spring	Summer	Fall
The spring championship, formerly called the Spring Nationals, is held in March (occasionally April), and first convened in 1958. It is contested over 11 days. The following national events are/were contested at the Spring NABC: North American Pairs – Flight A for the Baldwin Memorial Trophy, Flight B for the Golder Cup and Flight C for the President's Cup; Norman Kay Platinum Pairs; Open Pairs I – Silodor Trophy; Knockout Teams – Vanderbilt Cup; 0–10,000 Knockout Teams; Mixed Pairs – Rockwell Trophy; Silver Ribbon Pairs – Leventritt Trophy; Women's Pairs – Whitehead Trophy; IMP Pairs – Lebhar Trophy; Open Swiss Teams – Jacoby Trophy; Women's Swiss Teams – Machlin Trophy; Mott-Smith Trophy – awarded to the player with the most masterpoints from the Spring NABC	The summer championship, formerly called the Summer Nationals, have been held since 1929 and take place in July or August. In the thirties, they were played in Asbury Park, NJ, and lasted eight days. Now the location rotates and they are played over 11 days. The following national events are/were contested at the Summer NABC: Von Zedtwitz Life Master Pairs – Von Zedtwitz Trophy; Bruce LM-5000 Pairs – Bruce Trophy; Young LM-1500 Pairs – Young Trophy; Grand National Teams – Championship Flight and Flights A, B and C for the Morehead Trophy; Open Pairs II – Wernher Trophy; Knockout Teams – Spingold Trophy; 0–5000 Mini-Spingold Knockout Teams; 0–1500 Mini-Spingold Knockout Teams; Red Ribbon Pairs – Bean Trophy; Women's Knockout Teams – Wagar Trophy (dropped 2017); Women's Pairs – Wagar Trophy (added 2017); Fast Open Pairs; National 199er Pairs; Mixed Board-a-Match Teams – Chicago Trophy; Roth Open Swiss Teams; Senior Swiss Teams – Truscott Trophy; North American Collegiate Bridge Championship; Fishbein Trophy – awarded to the player with the most masterpoints from the Summer NABC.	The fall championship, held since 1927 takes place in November or early December. The Fall Championship began in 1937 as a four-day tournament and is now nine and one-half days. The following national events are/were contested at the Fall NABC: Life Master Open Pairs – Nail Trophy; Life Master Women's Pairs – Helen Sobel Smith Trophy; Non-life Master Pairs – Manfield Trophy; Mitchell Board-a-Match Teams; Women's Board-a-Match Teams – Sternberg Trophy; Edgar Kaplan Blue Ribbon Pairs – Cavendish Trophy; Mini-Blue Ribbon Pairs; National 99er Pairs; Board-a-Match Teams – Reisinger Trophy; North American Swiss Teams – Keohane Trophy; Goren Trophy – awarded to the player with the most masterpoints from the Fall NABC.

== Discontinued championships ==
- Master Individual (1931–1960)
- Fall National Open Pairs (1928–1962)
- Hilliard Mixed Pairs (1931–1962)
- Non-Life Master Swiss Teams (1982–1997)
- National 49er Pairs (1998–2007)
- Baze Senior Knockout Teams (1994–2018)

== Past tournaments (1928–1951) ==
From 1928 to 1951, there were only 1 or two NABCs a year. The table count is unknown and not listed in the table.

Year	Summer	Fall
1927	n/a	Chicago IL
1928	n/a	Cleveland OH
1929	Chicago IL	Chicago IL
1930	Asbury Park NJ	Cleveland OH
1931	Asbury Park NJ	Philadelphia PA
1932	Asbury Park NJ	New York NY
1933	Asbury Park NJ	Cincinnati OH
1934	Asbury Park NJ	New York NY
1935	Asbury Park NJ	Chicago IL
1936	Asbury Park NJ	Chicago IL
1937	Asbury Park NJ	Washington DC
1938	Asbury Park NJ	Cleveland OH
1939	Asbury Park NJ	Pittsburgh PA
1940	Asbury Park NJ	Philadelphia PA
1941	Asbury Park NJ	Richmond VA
1942	New York NY	Syracuse NY
1943	New York NY	New York NY
1944	New York NY	Atlantic City NJ
1945	New York NY	Atlantic City NJ
1946	New York NY	Hollywood FL
1947	New York NY	Atlantic City NJ
1948	Chicago IL	Philadelphia PA
1949	Chicago IL	Philadelphia PA
1950	Columbus OH	New Orleans LA
1951	Washington DC	Detroit MI

== Past tournaments (1952–) ==
During each event, the ACBL publishes a Daily Bulletin highlighting attendance, results, schedules, people profiles and interesting hands.

Year	Spring		Summer		Fall		Annual Total
Year	Location	Tables	Location	Tables	Location	Tables	Annual Total
1952	Not held	n/a	Cincinnati	3,093.00	Miami	2,017.00	5,110.00
1953	Not held	n/a	St Louis	3,054.00	Dallas	1,798.00	4,852.00
1954	Not held	n/a	Washington	4,496.00	Atlanta	1,775.00	6,271.00
1955	Not held	n/a	Chicago	4,619.00	Miami	2,359.00	6,978.00
1956	Not held	n/a	New York	5,679.00	New Orleans	2,777.00	8,456.00
1957	Not held	n/a	Pittsburgh	5,625.00	Los Angeles	6,154.00	11,779.00
1958	Atlantic City	3,076.00	Miami	4,068.00	Detroit	4,046.00	11,190.00
1959	Seattle	4,124.00	Chicago	6,939.00	Coronado	5,838.00	16,901.00
1960	Jackson	3,485.00	Los Angeles	8,462.00	New York	6,391.00	18,338.00
1961	Denver	4,910.00	Washington	7,989.00	Houston	4,967.00	17,866.00
1962	Lexington	4,703.00	Minneapolis	5,820.00	Phoenix	6,468.00	16,991.00
1963	St Louis	6,556.00	Los Angeles	12,486.00	Miami	7,129.00	26,171.00
1964	Portland	6,950.00	Toronto	11,150.00	Dallas	8,686.00	26,786.00
1965	Cleveland	8,128.00	Chicago	14,511.00	San Francisco	11,198.00	33,837.00
1966	Louisville	7,929.00	Denver	10,112.00	Pittsburgh	8,896.00	26,937.00
1967	Seattle	7,098.00	Montreal	10,926.00	New Orleans	8,904.00	26,928.00
1968	New York	13,535.00	Minneapolis	9,857.00	Coronado	7,858.00	31,250.00
1969	Cleveland	8,958.00	Los Angeles	11,470.00	Miami	9,069.00	29,497.00
1970	Portland	7,025.00	Boston	12,584.00	Houston	7,994.00	27,603.00
1971	Atlanta	9,706.00	Chicago	13,566.00	Phoenix	6,600.00	29,872.00
1972	Cincinnati	8,100.00	Denver	11,449.00	Lancaster	11,545.00	31,094.00
1973	St Louis	8,415.00	Washington	16,043.00	Las Vegas	13,464.00	37,922.00
1974	Vancouver	8,329.00	New York	15,310.00	San Antonio	8,419.00	32,058.00
1975	Honolulu	10,234.00	Miami	10,368.00	New Orleans	11,705.00	32,307.00
1976	Kansas City	8,790.00	Salt Lake City	10,722.00	Pittsburgh	8,787.00	28,299.00
1977	Pasadena	12,713.00	Chicago	13,170.00	Atlanta	10,701.00	36,584.00
1978	Houston	9,388.00	Toronto	18,408.00	Denver	9,467.00	37,263.00
1979	Norfolk	8,273.00	Las Vegas	18,517.00	Cincinnati	9,262.00	36,052.00
1980	Fresno	9,669.00	Chicago	11,889.00	Lancaster	13,521.00	35,079.00
1981	Detroit	8,216.00	Boston	14,079.00	San Francisco	11,377.00	33,672.00
1982	Niagara Falls	9,020.00	Albuquerque	9,776.00	Minneapolis	7,465.00	26,261.00
1983	Honolulu	11,697.00	New Orleans	10,519.00	Miami	10,555.00	32,771.00
1984	San Antonio	8,829.00	Washington	15,228.00	San Diego	12,071.00	36,128.00
1985	Montreal	10,184.00	Las Vegas	19,827.00	Winnipeg	5,533.00	35,544.00
1986	Portland	9,222.00	Toronto	21,075.00	Atlanta	11,285.00	41,582.00
1987	St Louis	10,828.00	Baltimore	17,072.00	Anaheim	13,948.00	41,848.00
1988	Buffalo	9,156.00	Salt Lake City	11,500.00	Nashville	13,214.00	33,870.00
1989	Reno	13,807.00	Chicago	14,901.00	Lancaster	12,580.00	41,288.00
1990	Ft Worth	11,302.00	Boston	15,325.00	San Francisco	13,239.00	39,866.00
1991	Atlantic City	11,279.00	Las Vegas	24,221.00	Indianapolis	9,267.00	44,767.00
1992	Pasadena	12,505.00	Toronto	16,680.00	Orlando	14,980.00	44,165.00
1993	Kansas City	10,132.00	Washington	18,270.00	Seattle	11,456.00	39,858.00
1994	Cincinnati	11,003.00	San Diego	15,800.00	Minneapolis	7,181.00	33,984.00
1995	Phoenix	11,945.00	New Orleans	12,840.00	Atlanta	10,269.00	35,054.00
1996	Philadelphia	10,995.00	Miami	9,395.00	San Francisco	12,984.00	33,374.00
1997	Dallas	11,101.00	Albuquerque	11,355.00	St. Louis	8,632.00	31,088.00
1998	Reno	13,967.00	Chicago	13,022.00	Orlando	12,035.00	39,024.00
1999	Vancouver	13,180.00	San Antonio	12,281.00	Boston	12,749.00	38,210.00
2000	Cincinnati	10,830.00	Anaheim	13,712.00	Birmingham	8,214.50	32,756.50
2001	Kansas City	9,370.50	Toronto	16,079.50	Las Vegas	16,818.00	42,268.00
2002	Houston	10,656.50	Washington, DC	14,650.00	Phoenix	12,458.50	37,765.00
2003	Philadelphia	10,840.00	Long Beach	12,246.50	New Orleans	12,402.50	35,489.00
2004	Reno	14,954.50	New York	13,351.00	Orlando	14,651.50	42,957.00
2005	Pittsburgh	9,593.00	Atlanta	13,463.00	Denver	10,141.75	33,197.75
2006	Dallas	10,318.50	Chicago	13,373.00	Honolulu	8,606.00	32,297.50
2007	St. Louis	10,232.00	Nashville	12,879.00	San Francisco	14,858.50	37,969.50
2008	Detroit	8,553.50	Las Vegas	19,720.00	Boston	10,636.00	38,909.50
2009	Houston	9,728.50	Washington, DC	14,115.00	San Diego	12,927.00	36,770.50
2010	Reno	12,196.50	New Orleans	10,995.50	Orlando	12,647.50	35,839.50
2011	Louisville	9,547.00	Toronto	13,194.00	Seattle	11,429.00	34,170.00
2012	Memphis	9,626.00	Philadelphia	11,913.00	San Francisco	13,410.50	34,949.50
2013	St. Louis	9,661.00	Atlanta	12,363.50	Phoenix	12,565.00	34,589.50
2014	Dallas	9,891.00	Las Vegas	16,616.50	Providence	9,573.50	36,081.00
2015	New Orleans	11,402.00	Chicago	13,684.50	Denver	9,058.50	34,145.00
2016	Reno	11,642.50	Washington, DC	12,812.00	Orlando	10,592.00	35,046.50
2017	Kansas City	8,691.00	Toronto	13,289.00	San Diego	11,747.50	33,727.50
2018	Philadelphia	10,317.50	Atlanta	11,268.50	Honolulu	6,034.50	27,620.50
2019	Memphis	9,644.00	Las Vegas	13,622.00	San Francisco	10,373.50	33,639.50
2020	Columbus	Canceled	Montreal	Canceled	Tampa	Canceled	NA
2021	St. Louis	Canceled	Providence	Canceled	Austin	5,256.00	5,256.00
2022	Reno	6,204.00	Providence	7,463.00	Phoenix	6,677.50	20,344.50
2023	New Orleans	7,124.50	Chicago	8,343.00	Atlanta	6,643.00	22,110.50
2024	Louisville	6,757.00	Toronto	9,560.50	Las Vegas	10,301.00	26,618.50
2025	Memphis	6,493.50	Philadelphia	9,459.00	San Francisco	7,526.50	23,479.00
2026	St. Louis	6,745.00	Minneapolis	7,931.5	San Diego	TBD	14,676.50

== Future tournament locations ==
For specifics of upcoming tournaments, refer to the ACBL website.

Year	Spring	Summer	Fall
2026			San Diego
2027	Dallas	Las Vegas	Seattle
2028	Reno	Orlando	Austin
2029	San Francisco	Atlanta	New Orleans
2030	Montreal	Philadelphia	Los Angeles
2031		Las Vegas	Washington DC
2032			
2033			
2034			
2035		Philadelphia	Washington DC
