= Masterpoints =

Points awarded by bridge organizations to individuals

Masterpoints or master points are points awarded by bridge organizations to individuals for success in competitive bridge tournaments run under their auspices. Generally, recipients must be members in good standing of the issuing organization. At the international level, competitions and point awards are administered by the World Bridge Federation (WBF); its affiliates at the multi-national level, such as the American Contract Bridge League (ACBL), also issue points as do national federations such as the English Bridge Union (EBU), and the Deutsche Bridge Verband (DBV) and independent leagues such as the American Bridge Association (ABA) and Bridge Base Online (BBO).

In general, each organization has its own scheme for categorizing competitive bridge events and has a parallel scheme for awarding various categories of points to successful players. Upon reaching certain thresholds in point accumulation or retention, most organizations rank the individual in recognition of their achievements. Points and rankings generally have no monetary value, but have prestige value for some players and are sought after by them over a lifetime of play.

In some cases, the point awarding scheme is an important means of raising revenue for the bridge organization insofar as they charge entry fees for each tournament where points are awarded and their availability acts as an incentive to participation; the more prestigious the points, the higher the entry fees.

In the past, points were issued as paper certificates, which gave the player a tangible record of their achievement, but these are now increasingly replaced by electronic recording.

"Masterpoint", as a single word, is a registered trademark of the ACBL in the United States.

== Awards of masterpoints ==
Players who achieve a high placing in an event sanctioned by the sponsoring bridge organization (a club game, sectional tournament, regional tournament, etc.) are awarded masterpoints according to their placing and the number of pairs, individuals, or teams who played in the event.

Some events have an upper masterpoint limit, meaning that only players with a masterpoint holding under the limit may participate. This allows less experienced players more of a chance to place high since they will not be playing against players who are significantly more experienced. Additionally, some events are stratified. This means that players with various masterpoint holdings play together, but in the final standings, players receive masterpoints based on their position within their stratum. For example, if you are first in stratum C, second in B and fourth in A, and the upper masterpoint limits are 300 for C, 500 for B, and 1000 for A, that means that among players with fewer than 300 masterpoints, you did the best. Among players with 500 points or fewer, you did second-best, and among players with fewer than 1000, you did fourth-best. With those divisions, a player with 700 points would be able to place in stratum A, but not in B or C.

== American Contract Bridge League ==
The ACBL awards several categories of masterpoints, each associated with the type of event and designated by a distinct color:

- Online - Also commonly referred as "unpigmented", are awarded in online club games
- Black - awarded in brick-and-mortar club games
- Silver - awarded in sectional tournaments, as well as Sectional Tournaments at Clubs (STaCs)
- Red - awarded in regional tournaments (for places other than overall and section tops), as well as North American Open Pairs (NAP) and Grand National Teams (GNT) games at clubs
- Gold - awarded for overall and section tops in regionals, as well as in NABCs (North American Bridge Championships) with an upper masterpoint limit of 750 or more
- Platinum - awarded in national-rated events with no upper masterpoint limit

Like most bridge governing bodies, the ACBL assigns ranks to players according to their masterpoint holdings; the requirements for its various ranks are listed below.

ACBL rank requirements for members who joined before January 1, 2010
| Rank | Masterpoint requirements |
|---|---|
| Rookie | Fewer than 5 |
| Junior Master | 5 |
| Club Master | 20 |
| Sectional Master | 50; At least 5 are silver |
| Regional Master | 100; At least 15 are silver At least 5 are red/gold/platinum |
| NABC Master | 200; At least 25 are silver At least 20 are red/gold/platinum At least 5 are gold/platinum |
| Life Master | 300; At least 50 are black At least 50 are silver At least 50 are red/gold/platinum At least 25 are gold/platinum |
| Bronze Life Master | A Life Master with 500 |
| Silver Life Master | A Life Master with 1000; At least 200 are silver/red/gold/platinum |
| Ruby Life Master | A Life Master with 1500; At least 300 are silver/red/gold/platinum |
| Gold Life Master | A Life Master with 2500; At least 500 are silver/red/gold/platinum |
| Sapphire Life Master | A Life Master with 3500; At least 700 are silver/red/gold/platinum At least 350 are gold/platinum |
| Diamond Life Master | A Life Master with 5000; At least 1000 are silver/red/gold/platinum At least 500 are gold/platinum |
| Emerald Life Master | A Life Master with 7500; At least 1500 are silver/red/gold/platinum At least 750 are gold/platinum |
| Platinum Life Master | A Life Master with 10000; At least 2000 are silver/red/gold/platinum At least 1000 are gold/platinum At least 100 are platinum |
| Grand Life Master | A Platinum Life Master with a victory in an eligible NABC+ or WBF event |

ACBL rank requirements for members who joined after January 1, 2010
| Rank | Masterpoint requirements |
|---|---|
| Rookie | Fewer than 5 |
| Junior Master | 5 |
| Club Master | 20; At least 5 are black |
| Sectional Master | 50; At least 10 are black At least 5 are silver |
| Regional Master | 100; At least 15 are black At least 15 are silver At least 5 are red/gold/platinum |
| NABC Master | 200; At least 20 are black At least 25 are silver At least 20 are red/gold/platinum At least 5 are gold/platinum |
| Advanced NABC Master | 300; At least 50 are black At Least 50 are silver At least 50 are red/gold/platinum At least 25 are gold/platinum |
| Life Master | 500; At least 75 are black At least 75 are silver At least 100 are red/gold/platinum At least 50 are gold/platinum |
| Bronze Life Master | A Life Master with 750 |
| Silver Life Master | A Life Master with 1000; At least 200 are silver/red/gold/platinum |
| Ruby Life Master | A Life Master with 1500; At least 300 are silver/red/gold/platinum |
| Gold Life Master | A Life Master with 2500; At least 500 are silver/red/gold/platinum |
| Sapphire Life Master | A Life Master with 3500; At least 700 are silver/red/gold/platinum At least 350 are gold/platinum |
| Diamond Life Master | A Life Master with 5000; At least 1000 are silver/red/gold/platinum At least 500 are gold/platinum |
| Emerald Life Master | A Life Master with 7500; At least 1500 are silver/red/gold/platinum At least 750 are gold/platinum |
| Platinum Life Master | A Life Master with 10000; At least 2000 are silver/red/gold/platinum At least 1000 are gold/platinum At least 100 are platinum |
| Grand Life Master | A Platinum Life Master with a victory in an eligible NABC+ or WBF event |

Masterpoints are partly a measure of skill, but the system is regarded by many players as a measure of experience and longevity rather than skill. Experience is often related to skill, but not necessarily. Throughout a lifetime, a player can earn many points, just with average play. For example, the same number of masterpoints, and hence the same rank, may have been achieved by Player A over 2 years and by Player B over 20 years.

When an ACBL member achieves the "Life Master" rank, the first digit of their 7-digit ACBL number is replaced with a letter according to the following chart. (New membership cards are sent accordingly at that rank.)

Life Master Number-To-Letter Conversion
| First Digit | Letter (when Life Master achieved) |
|---|---|
| 1 | J |
| 2 | K |
| 3 | L |
| 4 | M |
| 5 | N |
| 6 | O |
| 7 | P |
| 8 | Q |
| 9 | R |

== American Bridge Association ==
The American Bridge Association system of masterpoint ranking is as follows:

| Level | Title | Masterpoints |
|---|---|---|
| A | Asterisk | 0 to 24.99 |
| M | Master | 25.00 to 99.99 |
| L | Life Master | 100.00 to 299.99 |
| S | Sr Life Master | 300.00 to 599.99 |
| R | Ruby | 600.00 to 1,199.99 |
| D | Diamond | 1,200.00 to 2,499.99 |
| V | Silver Diamond | 2,500.00 to 4,999.99 |
| O | Gold Diamond | 5,000.00 to 9,999.99 |
| P | Platinum Diamond | 10,000.00 to 14,999.99 |
| B | Black Diamond | 15,000.00 to 19,999.99 |
| G | Grand Life Master | 20,000.00 or more |

== World Bridge Federation Master Points ==
In contrast, the World Bridge Federation system of Master Points annually reduces players' holdings of points older than one year by 15% and uses another classification of points, known as Placing Points, to record players' lifetime accumulation. The WBF also distinguishes between points earned in Open, Women's, Mixed, or Senior events and awards its Titles (such as World Grand Master), based upon the accumulation and retention scheme for the particular point classification.

== Comparison of Masterpoints between organizations ==
It is difficult to compare masterpoints between various organizations as they are not consistent in value.

The ACBL awards new ACBL members 10% of their ABA master points (up to 200 ACBL black points) and 20% of their WBF master points.

For tournament seeding, the ACBL uses 50% of a person's ABA master points plus their ACBL masterpoints.

For tournament seeding, the ABA uses 200% of a person's ACBL masterpoints (if less than 5,000) plus their ABA master points. If the player has 5,000+ ACBL masterpoints, they are seeded with 10,000 plus their ABA master points.

== Other rating systems ==
- Elo rating system
- Lehman Rating System
- EBU National Grading Scheme
