= List of contract bridge people =

This list is a compilation of contract bridge players, writers, administrators and personalities who have been recognized for their skills, achievements or contributions to the game as identified by various specific sources.

== People recognized by bridge organizations ==
=== American Contract Bridge League ===
==== Hall of Fame ====
ACBL Hall of Fame members († deceased)
Year inducted	Name	Category	Citation link	Video link
2011	Russ Arnold †	von Zedtwitz		
2002	Hermine Baron †	Open		
2012	Grant Baze †	von Zedtwitz		
1995	B. Jay Becker †	Open		
2006	Mike Becker	Open		
2010	David Berkowitz	Open		
1995	Easley Blackwood, Sr. †	Open		
2000	Lou Bluhm †	Open		
1997	David Bruce (Burnstine) †	von Zedtwitz		
2006	S. Garton Churchill †	von Zedtwitz		
2002	Ira Corn †	Blackwood		
1995	Barry Crane †	Open		
1995	John R. Crawford †	Open		
1964	Ely Culbertson †	Open		
1996	Josephine Culbertson †	Open		
1998	Billy Eisenberg	Open		
1998	Mary Jane Farell †	Open		
2000	Harry Fishbein †	Open		
2003	Henry Francis †	Blackwood		
2001	Richard Freeman †	Open		
1997	Edith Kemp Freilich †	Open		
1997	Richard L. Frey †	Open		
2002	Sam Fry, Jr. †	Open		
1998	John Gerber †	Open		
2006	Richard Goldberg †	Blackwood		
1999	Bobby Goldman †	Open		
2009	Agnes Gordon †	von Zedtwitz		
1964	Charles Goren †	Open		
1999	Michael Gottlieb †	von Zedtwitz		
2003	Fred Hamilton	Open		
1999	Bob Hamman	Open		
2004	Harry Harkavy †	von Zedtwitz		
2002	Emma Jean Hawes †	Open		
1997	Lee Hazen †	Blackwood		
2010	Paul Hodge †	von Zedtwitz		
1997	James (Jim) Jacoby †	Open		
1965	Oswald Jacoby †	Open		
1996	Eddie Kantar †	Open		
1995	Edgar Kaplan †	Open		
1996	Norman Kay †	Open		
2004	Amalya Kearse	Blackwood		
2001	Sami Kehela	von Zedtwitz		
2005	Betty Ann Kennedy †	Open		
2011	Eric Kokish	Blackwood		
2009	Mark Lair	Open		
1998	Alvin Landy †	von Zedtwitz		
2012	Kyle Larsen †	Open		
2000	Sidney Lazard †	Open		
1965	Sidney Lenz †	Open		
2001	Peter Leventritt †	Open		
1999	Theodore Lightner †	Open		
2008	Jerome S. Machlin †	Blackwood		
2007	Zia Mahmood	Open		
2004	Merwyn Maier †	von Zedtwitz		
2003	Ed Manfield †	Open		
2012	Jan Martel	Blackwood		
1997	Lew Mathe †	Open		
2005	Marshall Miles †	Blackwood		
2003	Jacqui Mitchell	Open		
1996	Victor (Vic) Mitchell †	Open		
1996	Albert Morehead †	Blackwood		
1998	Alphonse (Sonny) Moyse †	Open		
2001	Eric Murray †	von Zedtwitz		
2001	G. Robert (Bobby) Nail †	Open		
2008	Nick Nickell	Open		
2009	Aileen Osofsky †	Blackwood		
2008	Mike Passell	Open		
1998	Peter Pender †	Open		
1997	George Rapée †	Open		
2003	Steve Robinson	Open		
1997	Bill Root †	Open		
2015	Michael Rosenberg	Open		
2015	Audrey Grant	Blackwood	|	
2016	Thomas Smith †	Open		
2016	Eddie Wold	Open		
2017	Jeff Meckstroth	Open		
2017	Peter Nagy †	von Zedtwitz		
2017	Zeke Jabbour	Blackwood		
2000	George Rosenkranz †	Blackwood		
2002	Hugh Ross †	Open		
1995	Alvin Roth †	Open		
2004	Jeff Rubens	Blackwood		
2000	Ira Rubin †	Open		
2007	Kerri Sanborn	Open		
2002	Carol Sanders †	von Zedtwitz		
2002	Thomas Sanders †	von Zedtwitz		
1966	Howard Schenken †	Open		
2000	Meyer Schleifer †	von Zedtwitz		
2005	Percy Sheardown †	von Zedtwitz		
1996	Alfred Sheinwold †	Open		
1966	Sidney Silodor †	Open		
1996	P. Hal Sims †	von Zedtwitz		
1999	Al Sobel †	Open		
1995	Helen Sobel Smith †	Open		
2000	Charles Solomon †	Open		
2002	Paul Soloway †	Open		
2007	Alan Sontag	Open		
2001	Lew Stansby	Open		
1996	Sam Stayman †	Open		
2010	Tom Stoddard †	Blackwood		
2003	Tobias Stone †	von Zedtwitz		
1998	David Treadwell †	Blackwood		
2001	Alan Truscott †	Blackwood		
1998	Dorothy Truscott †	Open		
1964	Harold Vanderbilt †	Open		
1966	Waldemar von Zedtwitz †	Open		
1999	Margaret Wagar †	Open		
1999	Katherine Wei-Sender	Blackwood		
2004	Peter Weichsel	Open		
1995	Bobby Wolff	Open		
2005	Kit Woolsey	Open		
1965	Milton Work †	Open		
2001	Sally Young †	Open		
2013	Gail Moss Greenberg	von Zedtwitz		
2013	Max Hardy †	Blackwood		
2014	Chip Martel	Open		
2014	Jill Meyers	Open		
2014	Billy Rosen †	von Zedtwitz		
2014	Peggy Sutherlin	Blackwood		
2018	Bobby Levin	Open		
2018	Eric Rodwell	Open		
2018	Ralph Katz	Open		
2018	Mark Molson †	von Zedtwitz		
2019	Peter Boyd	Open		
2019	Bart Bramley	Open		
2019	Judy Radin	Open		
2019	Michael Seamon †	von Zedtwitz		
2019	Patty Tucker	Blackwood		
2020	Larry Cohen	Open		
2020	Lynn Deas	Open		
2020	Chuck Burger †	vonZedwitz		
2020	Beth Palmer †	von Zedtwitz		
2020	John Sutherlin †	von Zedwitz		
2020	Matt Smith	Blackwood		
2020	Sol Weinstein	Blackwood		

The first bridge Hall of Fame was inaugurated by The Bridge World in 1964 and invested nine members between then and 1966 after which it ceased sponsorship. The American Contract Bridge League adopted the concept to recognize the achievements and contributions of those residing in its territory (USA, Canada, Mexico and Bermuda) and inaugurated its own Hall of Fame in 1995 by accepting the original nine and adding eight others that year. Annually thereafter, new members have been added in as many as three award categories.

- Open Award – "living individuals who have achieved prominence in the game of bridge and have an outstanding tournament record"
- von Zedtwitz Award – "living or deceased individuals who have achieved prominence in the game of bridge and have an outstanding tournament record but who may not have been in the limelight for a significant period of time" (20 people in 19 years to 2014)
- Blackwood Award – "individuals who have contributed greatly to the game of bridge without necessarily being world class players" (19 people to 2014)

Nominees in the Open category must have attained the age of 60 by 1 January of the year of the induction ceremony. The primary basis for consideration in the Open and von Zedtwitz categories is the player's North American and international record and achievements as a member and representative of the ACBL. An individual's personal history, whether good or bad, should be considered in nominating candidates or selecting recipients.

— ACBL Hall of Fame charter, Foundation for the Preservation and Advancement of Bridge ACBL. Retrieved 2014-12-15.

In 2008, ACBL established the Foundation for the Preservation and Advancement of Bridge (FPAB) "to support the preservation of bridge history, to recognize individuals for their excellence and service to the game of bridge and to inspire the participation of youth through scholarships and grants."

==== Most influential personalities ====
ACBL's Most Influential Personalities († deceased, ‡ ACBL Hall of Fame member)
Rank	Name
1	Charles Goren † ‡
2	Ely Culbertson † ‡
3	William McKenney †
4	Edgar Kaplan † ‡
5	Bobby Wolff ‡
6	Fred Gitelman
7	Eddie Kantar ‡
8	Albert H. Morehead † ‡
9	Alfred Sheinwold † ‡
10	Waldemar von Zedtwitz † ‡
11	Nathan B. Spingold †
12	Al Roth † ‡
13 (Note: The list of most influential "personalities" comprised 52 ranked positions, but four of them (ranks 24, 27, 40 and 51) named two individuals each and two of them (13 and 17) named groups.)	Bracketed KO inventor(s) (Note: Bracketed knockout is a tournament format. "Of all the changes and innovations in duplicate over the past couple of decades, the advent of bracketed KOs is easily the most significant. ... The creator of the format is unknown." – Brent Manley, "The Top 52", Bridge Bulletin 78.4 (April 2012), p. 14.)
14	Oswald Jacoby † ‡
15	Barry Crane † ‡
16	Howard Schenken † ‡
17	The Italian Blue Team
18	Helen Sobel Smith † ‡
19	Bob Hamman ‡
20	Mike Lawrence
21	Terence Reese †
22	Marty Bergen
23	Larry Cohen
24	Jaime Ortiz-Patiño
24	José Damiani
25	Dorothy Truscott † ‡
26	George Rapée † ‡
27	Marc Low
27	Paul Heitner †
28	Richard Walsh
29	Jim Lopushinsky
30	Eric Murray ‡
31	Richard L. Frey † ‡
32 (Note: Manley listed Albert H. Morehead twice, at rank 32 in February and at rank 8 in April. In the May issue ("Oversight corrected", p. 63) he noted that the error leaves room for Harold Vanderbilt, as preface to an unnumbered profile on Vanderbilt.)	Albert Morehead † ‡
33	Alan Truscott † ‡
34	Josephine Culbertson † ‡
35	Zia Mahmood ‡
36	Eric Rodwell
37	Jeff Meckstroth
38	Victor Mollo †
39	Eric Kokish ‡
40	Aileen Osofsky † ‡
40	Barbara Seagram
41	Al Sobel † ‡
42	Alphonse Moyse † ‡
43	Audrey Grant
44	Kathie Wei-Sender ‡
45	Rose Meltzer
46	Grant Baze †
47	Tom Stoddard † ‡
48	S. J. (Skid) Simon †
49	Lee Hazen † ‡
50	Norman Squire †
51	Gosta Nordenson
51	Eric Jannersten †
52	Louis H. Watson †
53	Harold Vanderbilt † ‡

In 2012, the American Contract Bridge League celebrated the 75th anniversary of its creation by the merger of the American Bridge League and the United States Bridge Association in October 1937. In partial recognition, the League published a list of the 52 most influential personalities during its history.

Criteria included:

- contributions to bidding theory that have stood the test of time;
- contributions to bridge literature of enduring importance;
- contributions to law, regulation or administration making bridge more accessible or more fun;
- charisma that has broadened the appeal of bridge to non-players.

Selections were not limited to ACBL members or North American residents.

==== Player of the Year ====
ACBL Player of the Year
Year	Name
2019	Jacek Pszczoła
2018	Eric Greco
2017	Dennis Bilde
2016	Eric Greco
2015	Cedric Lorenzini
2014	Bobby Levin
2013	Martin Fleisher
2012	Zia Mahmood
2011	Joel Wooldridge
2010	Brad Moss
2009	Jeff Meckstroth
2008	Eric Rodwell
2007	Roy Welland
2006	Bob Hamman
2005	Zia Mahmood
2004	Jeff Meckstroth
2003	Michael Rosenberg
2002	Larry Cohen
2001	Ralph Katz
2000	Zia Mahmood
1999	John Mohan
1998	Paul Soloway
1997	Bart Bramley
1996	Zia Mahmood
1995	Fred Stewart
1995	Steve Weinstein
1994	Mike Rosenberg
1993	Bob Hamman
1992	Jeff Meckstroth
1991	Zia Mahmood
1990	Bob Hamman

The Player of the Year is awarded to the ACBL player accumulating the most platinum masterpoints in the calendar year.

=== Canadian Bridge Federation – Hall of Fame ===
CBF Hall of Fame Members († deceased)
Year inducted	Name	Citation link
2010	Bruce Elliott	
2010	Sam Gold †	
2010	Sami Kehela	
2010	Eric Murray	
2010	Percy Sheardown †	
2011	Diana Gordon	
2011	Eric Kokish	
2011	George Mittelman	
2011	Doug Drew	
2011	Ralph Cohen †	
2012	William Anderson †	
2012	Boris Baran	
2012	Mark Molson †	
2012	Peter Nagy †	
2013	Joey Silver	
2013	Audrey Grant	
2013	Francine Cimone	
2014	Agnes Gordon	
2014	Bruce Gowdy	
2015	John Carruthers	
2015	Allan Graves	
2016	Mary Paul	
2016	Katie Thorpe	
2017	Judith Gartaganis	
2017	Nicholas Gartaganis	
2018	Kamel Fergani	
2018	Sharyn Reus	
2019	Nader Hanna	
2019	Robert Lebi	
2023	Jurek Czyzowicz	
2023	Dan Jacob	
2024	Michael Roche	
2025	Gloria Silverman Bart	
2025	Joan Eaton	

The Canadian Bridge Federation (CBF) is the national bridge organization for Canada and established the CBF Hall of Fame in 2010 to recognize the achievements and contributions of Canadian bridge personalities.

=== European Bridge League – Awards and Distinctions ===
The European Bridge League (EBL) is a confederation of national bridge organizations for European countries, established 1947.

- Honorary Titles
- Plaques
- Medals. Since 1975, the EBL recognizes distinguished bridge people.

Gold Medal
Name	Nationality	Year
Aubry, Yves	France	2008
Bardach, David	Israel	1994
Beineix, Jean-Claude	France	2010
Butler, Geoffrey R.	England	1975
Damiani, José	France	1995
De Pauw, Marc	Belgium	2010
Jensen, Nils E.	Sweden	1987
Kielbasinski, Radoslaw	Poland	2006
Kooijman, Ton	Netherlands	2010
Magerman, Paul	Belgium	2002
Melander, Micke	Sweden	2010
Oliveira, Jose Manuel de	Portugal	2003
Ortiz-Patiño, Jaime	England	1983
Pencharz, Bill	England	1999
Rona, Gianarrigo	Italy	2010
Torlontano, Anna Maria	Italy	1999

Silver Medal
Name	Nationality	Year
Bardach, David	Israel	1989
Blanken-Burgers, Marijke	Netherlands	2010
Boekhorst, Andre	Netherlands	1989
Frenkiel, Marian	Poland	1989
Gerontopoulos, Panos	Greece	1991
Helm, Emmy van der	Netherlands	1989
Helm, Harry van der	Netherlands	1989
Hodler, Marc	Switzerland	1979
Jensen, Nils E.	Sweden	1977
Kramer, Jut	Netherlands	1979
Kunin, Reuben	Israel	1985
Latala, Slawek	Poland	2011
Levy, Eitan	Israel	2012
Melander, Micke	Sweden	2004
Oliveira, Jose Manuel de	Portugal	1999
Parnis-England, Margaret	Malta	1999
Pencharz, Bill	England	1989
Rohan, Karl	Austria	1989
Torlontano, Anna Maria	Italy	1991
Zabel, Gunnar	Denmark	1977

Bronze Medal
Name	Nationality	Year
Auken, Sabine	Germany	2010
Dix, Mario	Malta	1999
Gruber, Hans	Austria	1992
Mattsson, Goran	Germany	2010
Resta, Guido	Italy	2010
Schroeder, Dirk	Germany	2010
Szappanos, Geza	Hungary	2010
Yanes, Aureliano	Spain	2001

=== World Bridge Federation – Awards and Distinctions ===
The World Bridge Federation (WBF) is the world governing body for bridge, established in 1958.

- Women Stars
- WBF Master Point Records including titles such as "World Grand Master" (directory; some lists maintained infrequently or not at all)
- Medals (to 2006)
- Hall of Fame (inactive)
- Plaques & Trophies (to 2006)
- Youth Awards (to 2006)

== People recognized in bridge books ==
Numerous biographical entries are contained in the Encyclopedia of Bridge (1935), the various editions of The Official Encyclopedia of Bridge (1964–2011), The Bridge Players' Encyclopedia (1967), and in the British Bridge Almanack (2004).

In addition, the following books provide biographical information about bridge people as of the date of publication.

=== Aces All by Guy Ramsey (1955) ===
In the foreword of Aces All, Ramsey writes that "it is a book about some, though by no means all, of the leading players of today and the immediate yesterday..." He presents biographies of the following (all either British or playing in Britain):

- Leslie Dodds
- Harold Franklin
- Nico Gardener
- Maurice Harrison-Gray
- Ewart Kempson
- Kenneth Konstam
- Richard Lederer
- Iain Macleod
- Rixi Markus
- J. C. H. Marx
- Adam Meredith
- Terence Reese
- Boris Schapiro
- Jim Sharples
- Bob Sharples
- S. J. (Skid) Simon
- Dr. Paul Stern
- Joel Tarlo
- Louis Tarlo

=== The Bridge Immortals by Victor Mollo (1968) ===
The Bridge Immortals gives brief biographies of the "greatest bridge people living today", listed here in alphabetical order.

- Walter Avarelli
- B. Jay Becker
- Giorgio Belladonna
- David Berah
- Jean Besse
- Massimo D'Alelio
- Claude Deruy
- Leslie Dodds
- Pietro Forquet
- Richard L. Frey
- Nico Gardener
- Benito Garozzo
- Fritzi Gordon
- Maurice Harrison-Gray
- Dorothy Hayden
- Oswald Jacoby
- Pierre Jaïs
- Edgar Kaplan
- Norman Kay
- Theodore Lightner
- Paul Lukacs
- Rixi Markus
- Adam Meredith
- Rafael Munoz
- Camillo Pabis Ticci
- Carl'Alberto Perroux
- Terence Reese
- Alvin Roth
- Boris Schapiro
- Howard Schenken
- Cornelis Slavenburg
- Sam Stayman
- Roger Trézel
- Alan Truscott
- Egmont von Dewitz
- Einar Werner

=== World Class by Marc Smith (1999) ===
World Class: conversations with the bridge masters features "the crème de la crème of the world of bridge" in their own words. Here is Smith's classification of his interviews.

All-time Greats:

- John Collings
- Benito Garozzo
- Bob Hamman
- Per Olof Sundelin
- Dorothy Hayden Truscott

Stars of Today:

- Gabriel Chagas
- Geir Helgemo
- Apolinary Kowalski
- Magnus Lindkvist
- Zia Mahmood
- Jeff Meckstroth
- Andrew Robson
- Alfredo Versace

Women Stars:

- Sabine Auken
- Maria Erhart
- Karen McCallum
- Nicola Smith

Rising Stars:

- Boye Brogeland
- Fred Gitelman
- Jason Hackett and Justin Hackett
- Morten Lund Madsen

Star Writers:

- Larry N. Cohen
- Eddie Kantar
- Ron Klinger
- Mike Lawrence

=== British Bridge Almanack by Peter Hasenson (2004) ===
The Editor's Choice nominations are listed alphabetically as follows:

20 Greatest Players of All Time

- B. Jay Becker
- Giorgio Belladonna
- Norberto Bocchi
- Gabriel Chagas
- Billy Eisenberg
- Pietro Forquet
- Benito Garozzo
- Bob Hamman
- Maurice Harrison-Gray
- Geir Helgemo
- Oswald Jacoby
- Zia Mahmood
- Jeff Meckstroth
- Terence Reese
- Eric Rodwell
- Michael Rosenberg
- Howard Schenken
- Tim Seres
- Paul Soloway
- Bobby Wolff

19 Greatest Partnerships of the last 30 Years

- Cezary Balicki & Adam Żmudziński
- Giorgio Belladonna & Benito Garozzo
- Norberto Bocchi & Giorgio Duboin
- Marcelo Branco & Gabriel Chagas
- Paul Chemla & Michel Perron
- Tony Forrester & Andrew Robson
- Piotr Gawryś & Marcin Leśniewski
- Bobby Goldman & Paul Soloway
- Bob Hamman & Bobby Wolff
- Geir Helgemo & Tor Helness
- Eddie Kantar & Mike Lawrence
- Sami Kehela & Eric Murray
- Lorenzo Lauria & Alfredo Versace
- Alain Levy & Christian Mari
- Zia Mahmood & Michael Rosenberg
- Chip Martel & Lew Stansby
- Krzysztof Martens & Marek Szymanowski
- Jeff Meckstroth & Eric Rodwell
- Alan Sontag & Peter Weichsel

16 Greatest Female Partnerships of All Time

- Carla Arnolds & Bep Vriend
- Daniela von Arnim & Sabine Auken
- Véronique Bessis & Catherine D'Ovidio
- Marisa Bianchi & Anna Valenti
- Mildred Breed & Shawn Quinn
- Sally Brock & Sandra Landy
- Bénédicte Cronier & Sylvie Willard
- Pat Davies & Nicola Smith
- Lynn Deas & Beth Palmer
- Joan Durran & Jane Priday
- Maria Erhart & Doris Fischer
- Fritzi Gordon & Rixi Markus
- Emma Jean Hawes & Dorothy Hayden Truscott
- Karen McCallum & Kerri Sanborn
- Jacqui Mitchell & Gail Moss Greenberg
- Judi Radin & Kathie Wei

Greatest Player Ever:

- Bob Hamman

Greatest Authors:

- Mike Lawrence
- Terence Reese

=== Simply the Best - 20 of the Greatest Bridge Players of all Time by Brian Senior (2015) ===
In this seventy-page booklet, Senior provides commentary about twenty individuals he regards as the best bridge players or personalities of all time.

- Harold Vanderbilt
- Ely Culbertson
- P. Hal Sims
- Howard Schenken
- B. Jay Becker
- Charles Goren
- Helen Sobel
- Terence Reese
- Rixi Markus
- Giorgio Belladonna
- Pietro Forquet
- Benito Garozzo
- Omar Sharif
- Edgar Kaplan
- Bob Hamman
- Mike Lawrence
- George Rosenkranz
- Zia Mahmood
- Jeff Meckstroth
- Geir Helgemo

== Point leaders ==
=== American Contract Bridge League ===
Grand Life Masters (GLM) defined by lifetime ACBL master points (MP), with some condition on major achievements

- MP leaders all-time, including deceased members, GLM only

Players of the Decade – defined by ACBL platinum master points

- 1990s
- 2000s
- 2010s – Leaders, 2010 to present

=== European Bridge League ===
Lists of the top European Master Points (EMP) holders in various categories and for various periods

=== World Bridge Federation ===
The World Bridge Federation measures achievement in tournament play by a dual system of Master Points and Placing Points and provides ranked lists in Open, Women, and Seniors categories. Short colloquialisms like "Fulvio Fantoni is number one in the world" refer to the WBF Open Ranking. It ranks by Master Points those all-time players whose Placing Points accord "World Grand Master" status. MPs decay but PPs do not, so retired and deceased World Grand Masters remain on the list but drift toward the bottom.

== Other listings ==
=== Video interviews ===
The American Contract Bridge League has published at YouTube audio-video interviews of numerous players including almost 30 members of its Hall of Fame. These listings include some other videos of bridge personalities published at YouTube. (Those marked "ACBL Hall of Fame" may be interviews conducted by Audrey Grant, as are the ones so marked.)

- Mike Becker ACBL Hall of Fame
- David Berkowitz ACBL Hall of Fame
- David Berkowitz accepting Hall of Fame induction
- Boye Brogeland interviewed by John Carruthers
- John Carruthers interviewed by Bridge Kids
- Gabriel Chagas and Zia Mahmood explaining online money-bridge
- Larry Cohen presenting Berkowitz for Hall of Fame induction
- Larry Cohen and Jeff Meckstroth talking bridge on a cruise
- Joshua Donn and Roger Lee interviewed by Bridge Winners after Blue Ribbon 2011 victory
- Billy Eisenberg ACBL Hall of Fame
- Billy Eisenberg interviewed by Audrey Grant
- Henry Francis ACBL Hall of Fame
- Benito Garozzo interviewed by Audrey Grant
- Fred Gitelman interviewed by Bridge Kids
- Bobby Goldman ACBL Hall of Fame
- Joe Grue interviewed by Gavin Wolpert
- Fred Hamilton ACBL Hall of Fame
- Bob Hamman interviewed by Audrey Grant
- Bob Hamman ACBL Hall of Fame
- Bob Hamman interviewed by Bridge Kids
- Eddie Kantar interviewed by Audrey Grant
- Eddie Kantar ACBL Hall of Fame
- Edgar Kaplan ACBL Hall of Fame
- Sami Kehela ACBL Hall of Fame
- Betty Ann Kennedy ACBL Hall of Fame
- Eric Kokish ACBL Hall of Fame
- Mark Lair ACBL Hall of Fame
- Sidney Lazard ACBL Hall of Fame
- Bobby Levin interviewed by Audrey Grant
- Bobby Levin interviewed by Bridge Topics
- Zia Mahmood interviewed by Audrey Grant
- Zia Mahmood ACBL Hall of Fame
- Jan Martel ACBL Hall of Fame
- Jeff Meckstroth interviewed by Audrey Grant
- Jeff Meckstroth interviewed by Bridge Kids
- Jeff Meckstroth interviewed by Bridge Topics
- Mark Molson interviewed by Audrey Grant
- Eric Murray ACBL Hall of Fame
- Aileen Osofsky ACBL Hall of Fame
- Mike Passell ACBL Hall of Fame
- George Rapée ACBL Hall of Fame
- Barry Rigal interviewed by John Carruthers
- Eric Rodwell interviewed by Mark Horton 1
- Eric Rodwell interviewed by Mark Horton 2
- Steve Robinson ACBL Hall of Fame
- Carol Sanders ACBL Hall of Fame
- Kerri Sanborn ACBL Hall of Fame
- Alfred Sheinwold ACBL Hall of Fame
- Alan Sontag ACBL Hall of Fame
- Katherine Wei-Sender ACBL Hall of Fame
- Peter Weichsel ACBL Hall of Fame

=== Bridge in fiction ===
  - James Bond
  - M in James Bond (Miles Messervy)
  - The first James Bond film Dr. No (film) features bridge.
- The characters played by Chico Marx and Harpo Marx, in the 1930 film Animal Crackers.
- Hercule Poirot
- Snoopy and Woodstock
- E.F. Benson's Mapp and Lucia novels (1920–1939) feature bridge.
- Meteor Garden features bridge.
- The movie Sunset Boulevard features bridge
  - Norma Desmond

=== Famous people and bridge ===
- Warren Buffett
- George Burns
- Winston Churchill
- Deng Xiaoping
- Dwight Eisenhower
- Gandhi (Mohandas Karamchand Gandhi)
- Bill Gates
- George S. Kaufman
- Buster Keaton
- Chico Marx
- W. Somerset Maugham
- Lauritz Melchior
- Martina Navratilova
- Charles M. Schulz
- Omar Sharif
- Margaret Thatcher
- Everton Weekes
- John Paul Stevens
- Harold E. Talbott
- Fred M. Vinson
- Wan Li
- H. H. Asquith
- F. W. de Klerk
- Pervez Musharraf
- Janusz Korwin-Mikke
- John H. Caldwell (American Nordic skier)
- Forest Evashevski
- James Holzhauer
- Perry Johnson (2024 U.S. presidential candidate)
- John F. Kennedy

== See also ==
- List of bridge books
- List of bridge magazines
- List of bridge competitions and awards

=== People with Wikipedia articles ===
A

- Terje Aa
- Pierre Albarran
- Karen Allison
- Leslie Amoils
- Ron Andersen
- Martin Andresen
- Jay Apfelbaum
- Russ Arnold
- Sabine Auken
- Walter Avarelli

B

- Lynn Baker
- Cezary Balicki
- Boris Baran
- Hermine Baron
- Roger Bates
- Grant Baze
- Henry Beasley
- B. Jay Becker
- Mike Becker
- Giorgio Belladonna
- Richard Belton
- Albert Benjamin
- Marty Bergen
- David Berkowitz
- Lisa Berkowitz
- Huub Bertens
- Peter Bertheau
- Thomas Bessis
- Dennis Bilde
- David Bird
- Cheri Bjerkan
- Easley Blackwood Sr.
- Lou Bluhm
- Norberto Bocchi
- Janet de Botton
- Tim Bourke
- Peter Boyd
- Malcolm Brachman
- Bart Bramley
- Marcelo Branco
- Mildred Breed
- Tomas Brenning
- Sjoert Brink
- Raymond Brock
- Boye Brogeland
- John Brown
- David Bruce
- Michelle Brunner
- Walter Buller
- Krzysztof Buras
- Chuck Burger
- Ann Burnstein
- David Burnstine
- Wesley Burrowes

C

- Orlando Campos
- Mike Cappelletti
- Gerald Caravelli
- David Carter
- Drew Casen
- James Cayne
- Gabriel Chagas
- Juanita Chambers
- Bernie Chazen
- Curtis Cheek
- Paul Chemla
- Dennis Clerkin
- George Coffin
- Larry N. Cohen
- Larry T. Cohen
- Ben Cohen
- Gary Cohler
- Richard Coren
- Chris Compton
- Donna Compton
- Charles Coon
- Kitty Cooper
- Barry Crane
- Carol Crawford
- John R. Crawford
- Bénédicte Cronier
- Ely Culbertson
- Josephine Culbertson

D

- Massimo D'Alelio
- Hugh Darwen
- Lynn Deas
- Ishmael Delmonte
- Richard DeMartino
- Nikolay Demirev
- Seymon Deutsch
- Mike Develin
- John Diamond
- Leslie Dodds
- Joshua Donn
- Albert Dormer
- Doug Doub
- Bas Drijver
- Giorgio Duboin
- Michel Duguet

E

- Joan Eaton
- Billy Eisenberg
- Russ Ekeblad
- Waleed El Ahmady
- Morrie Elis
- Milton Ellenby
- J.B. Elwell
- Maria Erhart
- Bob Etter
- Disa Eythorsdottir

F

- Ben Fain
- Allan Falk
- Björn Fallenius
- Fulvio Fantoni
- Mary Jane Farell
- Phil Feldesman
- Harry Fishbein
- Arnie Fisher
- Lotan Fisher
- William Flannery
- Marty Fleisher
- Jeremy Flint
- Pietro Forquet
- Tony Forrester
- R.F. Foster
- Gene Freed
- Richard Freeman
- Edith Freilich
- Richard L. Frey
- Doris Fuller

G

- Nico Gardener
- Steve Garner
- Benito Garozzo
- Piotr Gawryś
- Terry W. Gee
- Ron Gerard
- John Gerber
- Pierre Ghestem
- Eldad Ginossar
- Fred Gitelman
- Jeff Glick
- Brian Glubok
- Ramesh Gokhale
- Bobby Goldman
- Arthur S. Goldsmith
- Gratian Goldstein
- Agnes Gordon
- Fritzi Gordon
- Phil Gordon
- Charles Goren
- Michael T. Gottlieb
- Larry Gould
- Ross Grabel
- Matt Granovetter
- Audrey Grant
- Allan Graves
- Eric Greco
- Alan C. Greenberg
- Ari Greenberg
- Gail Greenberg
- William Grieve
- Andrew Gromov
- Susanna Gross
- Glenn Grøtheim
- Joe Grue
- Nancy Gruver
- Ace Gutowsky

H

- Garey Hayden
- Fred Hamilton
- Bob Hamman
- Petra Hamman
- Nicolas Hammond
- Geoff Hampson
- Harold Harkavy
- Maurice Harrison-Gray
- Emma Jean Hawes
- Lee Hazen
- Geir Helgemo
- Tor Helness
- Christal Henner
- Walter Herbert
- Paul Hodge
- Marc Hodler
- Martin Hoffman
- Mark Horton
- John W. Hubbell
- Carl Hudecek
- Roy Hughes
- Edward Hymes

I J

- Zeke Jabbour
- George Jacobs
- Marc Jacobus
- Oswald Jacoby
- Pierre Jaïs
- Krzysztof Jassem
- Marilyn Johnson
- Henry Jones (Cavendish)
- Robert F. Jordan
- Patrick Jourdain

K

- Charles Kalme
- Mike Kamil
- Edwin Kantar
- Edgar Kaplan
- Fred Kaplan
- Peggy Kaplan
- Kalin Karaivanov
- Gaylor Kasle
- Ralph Katz
- Richard H. Katz
- George S. Kaufman
- Norman Kay
- Amalya Lyle Kearse
- Sami Kehela
- Hugh Kelsey
- Alicia Kempner
- Betty Ann Kennedy
- Roy Kerr
- Ron Klinger
- Martin de Knijff
- Putte Kock
- Eric Kokish
- Kenneth Konstam
- Daniel Korbel
- Valentin Kovachev
- Boris Koytchou
- Jim Krekorian
- Michał Kwiecień

L

- Mark Lair
- Hemant Lall
- Harry Lampert
- Steve Landen
- Alvin Landy
- Sandra Landy
- Kyle Larsen
- Emanuel Lasker
- Lorenzo Lauria
- Mike Lawrence
- Sidney H. Lazard
- Robert Lebi
- Michael Ledeen
- Richard Lederer
- Peter Lee
- Linda Lee
- James Lemon
- Sidney Lenz
- Sam Lev
- Peter Leventritt
- Bobby Levin
- Jill Levin
- Irina Levitina
- Theodore Lightner
- Harold Lilie
- Espen Lindqvist
- Robert Lipsitz
- Clyde E. Love
- Paul Lukacs
- Carolyn Lynch

M

- Iain Macleod
- Christina Lund Madsen
- Jim Mahaffey
- Tom Mahaffey
- Zia Mahmood
- Merwyn Maier
- Renee Mancuso
- Ed Manfield
- Jo Ann Manfield
- Ronald Mansbridge
- Rixi Markus
- Chip Martel
- Jan Martel
- Krzysztof Martens
- Jack Marx
- Lew Mathe
- Karen McCallum
- Pat McDevitt
- Jeff Meckstroth
- Rose Meltzer
- Adam Meredith
- Jill Meyers
- Marion Michielsen
- Marshall Miles
- Jacqui Mitchell
- Victor Mitchell
- Sol Mogal
- John Mohan
- Victor Mollo
- Mark Molson
- Albert H. Morehead
- Larry Mori
- Dan Morse
- Jo Morse
- Brad Moss
- Bauke Muller
- Franck Multon
- Eric Murray

N

- Bobby Nail
- Nick Nickell
- Claudio Nunes

O

- Don Oakie
- Harold Ogust
- Jack Olsen
- Lou Ann O'Rourke
- Jaime Ortiz-Patiño
- Aileen Osofsky
- Géza Ottlik

P

- Camillo Pabis Ticci
- Beth Palmer
- Mike Passell
- Richard Pavlicek
- Jordanis Pavlides
- Peter Pender
- Leonard Pennario
- Carl'Alberto Perroux
- Olive Peterson
- Hubert Phillips
- Sue Picus
- Josef Piekarek
- Brian Platnick
- William Pole
- Rozanne Pollack
- Michael Polowan
- Gary Pomerantz
- Matilda Poplilov
- Helen Portugal
- Julian Pottage
- Tony Priday
- Ricco van Prooijen
- Tommy Prothro
- Jacek Pszczoła

Q

- Shawn Quinn

R

- Judi Radin
- Pratap Rajadhyaksha
- George Rapée
- Barbara Rappaport
- Stella Rebner
- Terence Reese
- Doris Rhodes
- Kay Rhodes
- Barry Rigal
- Arthur G. Robinson
- Steve Robinson
- Jim Robison
- Andrew Robson
- Eric Rodwell
- Bill Root
- Eunice Rosen
- Billy Rosen
- Debbie Rosenberg
- Michael Rosenberg
- George Rosenkranz
- Hugh Ross
- Alvin Roth
- Dan Rotman
- Jeff Rubens
- Ron Rubin
- Ira Rubin

S

- Tarek Sadek
- Kerri Sanborn
- Carol Sanders
- Thomas K. Sanders
- Boris Schapiro
- Howard Schenken
- John Schermer
- Meyer Schleifer
- Peter Schneider
- Kay Schulle
- Richard Schwartz
- Ron Schwartz
- Barbara Seagram
- Michael Seamon
- William Seamon
- Janice Seamon-Molson
- A. J. Sefi
- Martin Seligman
- Antonio Sementa
- Brian Senior
- Tim Seres
- Omar Sharif
- Alfred Sheinwold
- Shen Chun-shan
- Ruth Sherman
- Jaggy Shivdasani
- Rita Shugart
- Allan Siebert
- Sidney Silodor
- S. J. Simon
- Dorothy Rice Sims
- P. Hal Sims
- Steve Sion
- Alexander Smirnov
- Helen Sobel Smith
- Marc Smith
- Nicola Smith
- Mike Smolen
- Tobi Sokolow
- Paul Soloway
- Charles J. Solomon
- Peggy Solomon
- Alan Sontag
- Nathan B. Spingold
- Ivar Stakgold
- JoAnna Stansby
- Lew Stansby
- Allan Stauber
- Samuel Stayman
- Sherman Stearns
- Paul Stern
- Catherine A. Streeter
- Fred Stewart
- Tobias Stone
- P.O. Sundelin
- John Sutherlin
- Peggy Sutherlin
- John Swanson
- Paul Swanson
- Ralph Swimer
- Peter Swinnerton-Dyer

T

- Edward O. Taylor
- Haig Tchamitch
- Tom Townsend
- Roger Trézel
- Dorothy Hayden Truscott
- Alan Truscott
- Alex Tschekaloff

U

- Helen Utegaard

V

- Harold Stirling Vanderbilt
- Alfredo Versace
- Daniela von Arnim
- Ron Von der Porten
- Waldemar von Zedtwitz
- Bep Vriend

W

- Margaret Wagar
- Rhoda Walsh
- Louis H. Watson
- C. C. Wei
- Katherine Wei-Sender
- Peter Weichsel
- Howard Weinstein
- Steve Weinstein
- Albert Weiss
- Roy Welland
- Valerie Westheimer
- Berry Westra
- Charles Wigoder
- Adam Wildavsky
- Sylvie Willard
- Chris Willenken
- Eddie Wold
- Bobby Wolff
- Gavin Wolpert
- Jenny Wolpert
- Joel Wooldridge
- Kit Woolsey
- Sally Woolsey
- Milton Work
- Meike Wortel

X Y Z

- Sally Young
- Richard Zeckhauser
- Jack Zhao
- Pierre Zimmermann
- Adam Żmudziński
