= The Official Encyclopedia of Bridge =

Encyclopedia

The Official Encyclopedia of Bridge (7th Edition)
- The 7th Edition cover and appended CDs
- Editor: Brent Manley co-editors: Mark Horton; Tracey Greenberg-Yarbro; Barry Rigal
- Language: English
- Publisher: American Contract Bridge League
- Publication date: August 2011
- Publication place: United States
- Pages: 633
- ISBN: 978-0-939-46099-1
- Dewey Decimal: 795.415

The Official Encyclopedia of Bridge (OEB) presents comprehensive information on the card game contract bridge with limited information on related games and on playing cards. It is "official" in reference to the American Contract Bridge League (ACBL) which authorized its production and whose staff prepared and/or supervised its various editions.

The first edition of the Encyclopedia was published in 1964 with Richard Frey as Editor-in-Chief; it was the only one with an edition revised for an overseas market (The Bridge Players' Encyclopedia, 1967). The seventh and latest edition was published in 2011 following intermediate editions in 1971, 1976, 1984, 1994 and 2001. The Executive Editor for the first six was Alan Truscott, bridge editor of The New York Times. For the fourth through sixth editions, Henry Francis succeeded Frey as Editor-in-Chief. Frey and Francis were also successive editors of the ACBL monthly membership magazine. Numerous contributing editors to the Encyclopedia were listed in each edition as were members of Editorial Advisory Boards.

The redesigned seventh edition, in preparation since 2006, was released in November 2011. Editor was Brent Manley, with primary assistance from Mark Horton, Barry Rigal, and Tracey Yarbro. This is the first edition to depart from the traditional alphabetical listing of individual entries and present a compilation of entries grouped into chapters, such as Bidding, Conventions and Card Play. Numerous photographs are included, together with two CDs; one containing the full printed version of the Encyclopedia and the other with biographies and tournament results.

Each year since 1982, the American Bridge Teachers' Association (ABTA) has "recognized one or more books as contributing significantly to the teaching of contract bridge". In 1984 the Encyclopedia received a "Special Award", with all other candidates being deferred until the following year for consideration.

In 1994 the ACBL commissioned a poll of well-known players and writers, who chose the Encyclopedia as one of the 20 best bridge books of all time.

The article on bridge in The Canadian Encyclopedia, published in 2006 and last edited in 2013, lists the Official Encyclopedia as further reading, the only book specified.

The first edition is described in the bibliography of bridge books compiled by Tim Bourke and John Sugden as follows: "A massive work that is an essential reference for any Bridge player. The work derives some of its structure from both The Whist Reference Book by William Mill Butler, and Ely Culbertson's, The Encyclopedia of Bridge. A wonderful work from any angle."

In 2011, Philip Alder writing in the New York Times described the seventh edition as a "must-buy".

== First edition – 1964 ==
The first edition set the ground work for the goals and scope of the Encyclopedia. In its forward, Editor-in-Chief Richard L. Frey observed that:

The only previous Encyclopedia of Bridge was edited by Ely Culbertson and published in 1935 ... The ambitious goal set for this Official Encyclopedia of Bridge was simple to state: "To provide an official and authoritative answer to any question a reader might ask about the game of contract bridge and its leading players."

On its dust jacket, the first edition states:

This encyclopedia is the most complete and authoritative book of information, guidance, and instruction for bridge players, ever published. It covers every aspect of bridge in all bridge-playing countries of the world; it contains complete and lucid definitions of every term; it describes and illustrates every standard bid, every recognized convention, and every type of play.

The first edition is divided into two main parts:

1. Main listings: The Introduction indicates that the entries in the main listings fall into five main categories (technical, historical, procedural, biographical and geographical, and terminological) and are presented alphabetically over 683 pages with entries frequently ending with cross-references to other entries on related category topics. Over 50 bridge-playing countries are listed and brief biographies of over 1,500 American and over 400 other players are recorded.
2. Bibliography: The main listings are followed by an eight-page bibliography.

The Harvard University online catalog entry for the first edition includes a note that "A great majority of the unsigned technical entries are by Alan Truscott."

=== Editors ===
- Richard L. Frey, Editor-in-Chief
- Alan F. Truscott, Executive Editor

=== Editorial advisory board ===
- Albert H. Morehead, Chairman
- B. Jay Becker
- Geoffrey L. Butler
- Carlos Cabanne
- S. Carini-Mazzaccara
- Robert de Nexon
- Charles H. Goren
- Alfred M. Gruenther
- Ranik Halle
- Johannes Hammerich
- Ernst Heldring
- Oswald Jacoby
- Eric Jannersten
- Alvin Landy
- Alphonse Moyse, Jr.
- Carlo Alberto Perroux
- David R. Pigot
- Leon Sapire
- Alfred Sheinwold
- Charles J. Solomon
- Michael J. Sullivan
- Severo A. Tuason
- Harold Vanderbilt
- Waldemar von Zedtwitz

=== Contributing editors ===
- Russell Baldwin
- Jean Besse
- George W. Beynon
- Easley Blackwood
- Jens Boeck
- George S. Coffin
- Eric Crowhurst
- Victor R. Daly
- Albert Dormer
- Albert Field
- Harry Fishbein
- Mrs. A.L. Fleming
- Sam Fry, Jr.
- Richard Goldberg
- Harry Goldwater
- M. Harrison-Gray
- Mrs. Dorothy Hayden
- Lee Hazen
- Don Horwitz
- Monroe Ingberman
- Arturo Jaques
- Edwin B. Kantar
- Edgar Kaplan
- Sammy Kehela
- Jack Kelly
- Edwart Kempson
- José Le Dentu
- A. Littman-Lemaitre
- Paul Lukacs
- Arthur Marks
- Mrs. Rixi Markus
- Philip Merry
- Marshall L. Miles
- Victor Mollo
- Florence Osborn
- George Partos
- Harry Polunsky
- R. Anthony Priday
- Terence Reese
- William S. Root
- Federico Rosa
- Dr. George Rosenkranz
- Lawrence Rosler
- Ernest Rovere
- Jeff Rubens
- Howard Schenken
- Jerome Scheuer
- William Seamon
- Ramon Skoroupo
- Al Sobel
- Norman Squire
- Sam Stayman
- Roy G. Telfer
- Alec Traub
- Robert Wakeman
- Charlton Wallace
- Robert W. Wilson

=== International Edition ===
In 1967 an edition revised for the needs of a British and European audience was published by Paul Hamlyn (London) under the title The Bridge Players' Encyclopedia. It was described as an International Edition based on The Official Encyclopedia of Bridge of 1964. The edition modified American spellings, 'translated' bidding structures to the more widely used Acol system, omitted biographical notes on some lesser known Americans and added biographical notes on British and European players resulting in coverage of over 50 countries and over 500 players. The editors were Ben Cohen and Rhoda Barrow.

== Second edition – 1971 ==
Richard Frey writes that since the first edition of 1964,

... bridge has attracted new adherents throughout the world, systems and conventions have been more and more influenced by "science" and "artificiality" ...

The second edition is divided into four main parts:

1. Main listings: technical bidding and play, historical, procedural (tournament organization, laws, etc.), geographical, and terminological. As in the first edition, entries frequently end with cross-references to other entries on related topics.
2. Biographies of leading personalities: The biographies include over 2,000 Americans and over 500 players from elsewhere.
3. Tournament results: American Bridge Association National Championships, All-American Regional Championships, and European, Far East and South American Championships. World Championships and USBA Grand Nationals are in the main listings
4. Bibliography: listed according to subject matter.

=== Editors ===
- Richard L. Frey, Editor-in-Chief
- Alan F. Truscott, Executive Editor
- Thomas S. Smith, Managing Editor

=== Editorial Advisory Board ===
- B. Jay Becker
- Geoffrey L. Butler
- Carlos Cabanne
- S. Carini-Mazzaccara
- Charles H. Goren
- Alfred M. Gruenther
- Ranik Halle
- Johannes Hammerich
- Ernst Heldring
- Oswald Jacoby
- Eric Jannersten
- Edgar Kaplan
- Alphonse Moyse, Jr.
- Carlo Alberto Perroux
- Leon Sapire
- Alfred Sheinwold
- Charles J. Solomon
- Michael J. Sullivan
- Severo A. Tuason
- Waldemar von Zedtwitz

=== Contributing Editors ===
- Mrs. Rhoda Barrow
- Jean Besse
- Easley Blackwood
- Jens Boeck
- George S. Coffin
- Eric Crowhurst
- Victor R. Daly
- Albert Dormer
- Albert Field
- Mrs. A.L. Fleming
- Sam Fry, Jr.
- Richard Goldberg
- Harry Goldwater
- M. Harrison-Gray*
- Mrs. Dorothy Hayden
- Lee Hazen
- Don Horwitz
- Monroe Ingberman
- Arturo Jaques
- Edwin B. Kantar
- Fred Karpin
- Sammy Kehela
- Jack Kelly*
- Edwart Kempson*
- José Le Dentu
- A. Littman-Lemaitre
- Paul Lukacs
- Arthur Marks*
- Mrs. Rixi Markus
- Philip Merry
- Marshall L. Miles
- Victor Mollo
- George Partos
- Harry Polunsky
- R. Anthony Priday
- Terence Reese
- William S. Root
- Federico Rosa
- Dr. George Rosenkranz
- Lawrence Rosler
- Ernest Rovere
- Jeff Rubens
- Howard Schenken
- Jerome Scheuer
- William Seamon
- Ramon Skoroupo*
- Terry Smith
- Al Sobel
- Sam Stayman
- Roy G. Telfer
- Alec Traub
- Robert Wakeman
- Charlton Wallace
- Robert W. Wilson*

== Third edition – 1976 ==
Richard Frey comments on several themes in the foreword to the third edition:

We have seen rapid and radical developments in bidding systems; explosions of new cheating scandals and employment of devices to prevent them; the creation of techniques for warning opponents about bids that have unusual meanings ...

... the newly uncovered evidence that bridge was known and played before the earliest previous accreditation (to Russia) of its origin and its name.

The third edition is organized into the same four parts as the second. There are again over 2,500 biographies but newer and stricter criteria were applied and many previous entries have been superseded by new ones; successes in competitions remain in the appropriate event listings.

=== Editors ===
- Richard L. Frey, Editor-in-Chief
- Alan F. Truscott, Executive Editor
- Amalya L. Kearse, Editor, Third Edition

=== Editorial Advisory Board ===
- B. Jay Becker
- Geoffrey L. Butler
- Carlos Cabanne
- S. Carini-Mazzaccara
- Herman Filarski
- Richard L. Goldberg
- Charles Goren
- Alfred M. Gruenther
- Ranik Halle
- Johannes Hammerich
- Ernst Heldring
- Oswald Jacoby
- Eric Jannersten
- Edgar Kaplan
- José Le Dentu
- A. Littman-Lemaitre
- Carlo Alberto Perroux
- Julius Rosenblum
- George Rosenkranz
- Leon Sapire
- Alfred Sheinwold
- Waldemar von Zedtwitz

=== Contributing Editors ===
- Jean Besse
- Easley Blackwood
- Jens Boeck
- George S. Coffin
- Ralph Cohen
- Eric Crowhurst
- Victor R. Daly
- Albert Dormer
- Robert Ewen
- Albert Field
- Mrs. A.L. Fleming
- Henry G. Francis
- Harold Franklin
- Sam Fry, Jr.
- Richard Goldberg
- Harry Goldwater
- Lee Hazen
- Don Horwitz
- Monroe Ingberman
- Arturo Jaques
- Edwin B. Kantar
- Fred Karpin
- Sammy Kehela
- Ron Klinger
- Rhoda Barrow Lederer
- Paul Lukacs
- Rixi Markus
- Philip Merry
- Marshall L. Miles
- Victor Mollo
- George Partos
- R. Anthony Priday
- Terence Reese
- William S. Root
- Lawrence Rosler
- Ernest Rovere
- Jeff Rubens
- Howard Schenken
- William Seamon
- Edith Simon
- Terry Smith
- Thomas M. Smith
- Sam Stayman
- Roy G. Telfer
- Alec Traub
- Robert True
- Dorothy Hayden Truscott
- Jo Van Den Borre
- Robert Wakeman
- Charlton Wallace

== Fourth edition – 1984 ==
The fourth edition contains 922 pages — the most of any edition. Again, the pace of change in bridge is great as Richard Frey, now Editor Emeritus having been succeeded as Editor-in-Chief by Henry Francis, notes in the Foreword,

... a quantum leap in the technical material ... many new and intriguing methods and ideas have made their appearance in the past seven years, and some have been widely adopted.

The organization of the fourth edition follows that of the third and second.

=== Editors ===
- Henry G. Francis, Editor-in-Chief
- Alan F. Truscott, Executive Editor
- Richard L. Frey, Editor Emeritus
- Diane Hayward, Editor, Fourth Edition

=== Editorial Advisory Board ===
- B. Jay Becker
- Geoffrey L. Butler
- Carlos Cabanne
- S. Carini-Mazzaccara
- Benno Gimkiewicz
- Richard L. Goldberg
- Charles Goren
- Ranik Halle
- Johannes Hammerich
- Denis Howard
- Oswald Jacoby
- Edgar Kaplan
- José Le Dentu
- Jaime Ortiz-Patiño
- George Rosenkranz
- Leon Sapire
- Alfred Sheinwold
- Waldemar von Zedtwitz

=== Contributing Editors ===
- Bertrand N. Bauer
- Jean Besse
- Easley Blackwood
- George S. Coffin
- Ralph Cohen
- Eric Crowhurst
- Victor R. Daly
- George F. Donaghy
- Albert Dormer
- Sue Emery
- Robert Ewen
- Albert Field
- Irene (Dimmie) Fleming
- Harold Franklin
- Sam Fry, Jr.
- Richard Goldberg
- Harry Goldwater
- Lee Hazen
- Don Horwitz
- Monroe Ingberman
- Arturo Jaques
- Edwin B. Kantar
- Fred Karpin
- Steve Katz
- Sammy Kehela
- Ron Klinger
- Rhoda Barrow Lederer
- Rixi Markus
- Philip Merry
- Marshall L. Miles
- Richard Oshlag
- George Partos
- Richard Anthony Priday
- Terence Reese
- William S. Root
- Lawrence Rosler
- Ernest Rovere
- Jeff Rubens
- William Sachen
- William Seamon
- Edith Simon
- Terry Smith
- Thomas M. Smith
- Sam Stayman
- Peggy Sutherlin
- Roy G. Telfer
- Alec Traub
- Robert True
- Dorothy Hayden Truscott
- Jo Van Den Borre

== Fifth edition – 1994 ==
In the Foreword, Alan Truscott notes,

The changes in the technical section have been far greater than in any of the earlier editions, reflecting the many theoretical advances in the past decade.

The four part organization of the book follows the format of its immediate predecessors. More than 2,800 bridge personalities are listed in the biographies, largely updated by Dorthy Francis; Truscott prepared most of the technical and foreign material with Frank Stewart contributing significantly to the technical; the expanded 21 page bibliography was prepared by William Sachen. Previous editions were published by Crown Publishers Inc. of New York; the 5th edition was published by the American Contract Bridge League.

=== Editors ===
- Henry G. Francis, Editor-in-Chief
- Alan F. Truscott, Executive Editor
- Dorthy A Francis, Editor, Fifth Edition

=== Contributing Editors ===
- Phillip Alder
- Carlos Cabanne
- Larry N. Cohen
- Gabriel Chagas
- Hugh Darwen
- Sue Emery
- Albert Field
- Santanu Ghose
- Richard Grenside
- Olof Hanner
- Diane Hayward
- Per Jannersten
- Jared Johnson
- Patrick Jourdain
- Edgar Kaplan
- Phillip Martin
- Svend Novrup
- David Parry
- R. Anthony Priday
- Bill Sachen
- Ton Schipperheyn
- Frank Stewart
- Jess Stuart
- Dorothy Truscott
- Sol Weinstein

== Sixth edition – 2001 ==
The 6th Edition cover

The front inside panel of the dust jacket states:

"This work is the most complete and authoritative book of information, guidance and instruction ever published for bridge players."

The Foreword states,

This edition has been prepared primarily by Henry Francis, with major contributions and help from Alan Truscott and Barry Rigal. Once again Dorthy Francis has updated American biographies and world-wide tournament results. Tim Bourke, who owns one of the world's most complete bridge libraries and who assembled the Morehead Library at ACBL Headquarters, prepared the bibliography.

The four part organization of the book follows the format of its immediate predecessors. More than 3,000 bridge personalities are listed in the biographies; the 60 page bibliography doubled that of the previous edition.

=== Editors ===
- Henry G. Francis, Editor-in-Chief
- Alan F. Truscott, Executive Editor
- Dorthy A Francis, Editor, Sixth Edition

=== Contributing Editors ===
- Phillip Alder
- Carlos Cabanne
- Gabriel Chagas
- Hugh Darwen
- Herman De Wael
- Elly Ducheyne-Swaan
- Albert Field
- Santanu Ghose
- Anna Gudge
- Mazhar Jafri
- Per Jannersten
- Danny Kleinman
- Eric Kokish
- Sandra Landy
- Jean-Paul Meyer
- Svend Novrup
- Julian Pottage
- Barry Rigal
- Gianarrigo Rona

== Seventh edition – 2011 ==
The 7th edition had its beginning about 2006, when decisions were made about the format, the contents and the people who would be involved in putting it together. It departs from previous editions in several ways. Foremost is the medium: two CD-ROM volumes with one book whose contents match the first CD. All previous editions were one-volume books.

This edition introduces photographs and has many of them. It comes with an index instead of a cross-reference table. In the print volume, both pages and font are bigger. The four-part organization introduced in 1971, with a very large alphabetical part one, has been replaced by about 40 chapters and appendices. The printed book and the first CD both comprise chapters 1 to 26. The second volume, CD only, comprises eight chapters of biographical entries and three appendices on Masterpoints, achievements, and tournament results.

=== Editors ===
- Brent Manley, Editor
- Mark Horton, Co-Editor
- Tracey Greenberg-Yarbro, Co-Editor
- Barry Rigal, Co-Editor

=== Contributing editors ===
Current edition

- Henry B. Anderson
- Bill Buttle
- John Carruthers
- Simon Cocheme
- Lee Daugharty
- Tom Dawson
- Judy Dawson
- Herman De Wael
- Fred Gitelman
- Robb Gordon
- Terre Gorham
- Anna Gudge
- Peter Hasenson
- Per Jannersten
- Peggy Kaplan
- Paul Linxwiler
- Donna Manley
- Jan Martel
- Kelley McGuire
- Jean-Paul Meyer
- Pony Nehmert
- Julian Pottage
- Jeff Rubens
- Frank Stewart
- Ron Tacchi
- Bob van de Velde
- Jeroen Warmerdam
- Anders Wirgen

Past editions

- Phillip Alder
- Jean Besse
- Larry N. Cohen
- Eric Crowhurst
- Albert Dormer
- Sue Emery
- Robert Ewen
- Richard Grenside
- Olof Hanner
- Maurice Harrison-Gray
- Diane Hayward
- Monroe Ingbergman
- Jane Johnson
- Jared Johnson
- Patrick Jourdain
- Edgar Kaplan
- Fred Karpin
- Sami Kehela
- Rhoda Barrow Lederer
- Phillip Martin
- Marshall Miles
- Victor Mollo
- David Parry
- Tony Priday
- Bill Sachen
- Jess Stuart
- Alec Traub
- Dorothy Truscott
- Ray Telfer
- Sol Weinstein

=== Contents ===
The book contains the following Table of Contents; the first of two compact discs (CD) contains a Portable Document Format (pdf) version of the book.

- Chapter 1. History
- Chapter 2. ACBL Hall of Fame
- Chapter 3. CBF Hall of Fame
- Chapter 4. Bridge at the Top
- Chapter 5. Bridge Museum
- Chapter 6. ACBL – How it Works
- Chapter 7. Tournaments
- Chapter 8. Trophies
- Chapter 9. World of Bridge
- Chapter 10. Terminology
- Chapter 11. Bidding
- Chapter 12. Competitive Bidding
- Chapter 13. Conventions
- Chapter 14. Systems
- Chapter 15. Card play
- Chapter 16. Matchpoints vs. IMPs
- Chapter 17. Carding
- Chapter 18. Advanced Plays
- Chapter 19. Squeezes
- Chapter 20. Suit Combination
- Chapter 21. At the Table
- Chapter 22. Mathematics at Bridge
- Chapter 23. Rules and "Laws" of Bridge
- Chapter 24. Bridge and the Digital Age
- Chapter 25. Curiosities
- Chapter 26. Rubber Bridge

The second CD provides more information about bridge people and competitions per the following table of contents; its contents are not available in print.

- ACBL Hall of Fame
- CBF Hall of Fame
- Grand Life Masters
- Platinum Life Masters
- Emerald Life Masters
- Diamond Life Masters
- Other Noted Personalities
- ACBL Presidents
- National Tournament Directors
- Appendix One — North American Results
- Appendix Two — Masterpoints Race Results
- Appendix Three — World Championship Results

== Bibliographic data ==
- Frey, Richard L.; Truscott, Alan F., eds. (1964). The Official Encyclopedia of Bridge (1st ed.). New York: Crown Publishers, Inc. p. 691. LCCN 64023817.
- Frey, Richard L.; Truscott, Alan F.; Cohen, Ben; Barrow, Rhoda, eds. (1967). The Bridge Players' Encyclopedia. London: Paul Hamlyn. p. 674. OCLC 560654187.
- Frey, Richard L.; Truscott, Alan F.; Smith, Thomas M., eds. (1971). The Official Encyclopedia of Bridge (2nd ed.). New York: Crown Publishers, Inc. p. 793. LCCN 73108084. OCLC 250404789.
- Frey, Richard L.; Truscott, Alan F.; Kearse, Amalya L., eds. (1976). The Official Encyclopedia of Bridge (3rd ed.). New York: Crown Publishers, Inc. p. 858. ISBN 0-517-52724-3. LCCN 76017053.
- Francis, Henry G.; Truscott, Alan F.; Frey, Richard L.; Hayward, Diane, eds. (1984). The Official Encyclopedia of Bridge (4th ed.). New York: Crown Publishers, Inc. pp. 922. ISBN 0-517-55272-8. LCCN 84001791.
- Francis, Henry G.; Truscott, Alan F., eds. (1994). The Official Encyclopedia of Bridge (5th ed.). Memphis, TN: American Contract Bridge League. pp. 827 (plus 38 page Bibliography). ISBN 0-943855-48-9. LCCN 96188639.
- Francis, Henry G.; Truscott, Alan F.; Francis, Dorthy A., eds. (2001). The Official Encyclopedia of Bridge (6th ed.). Memphis, TN: American Contract Bridge League. pp. 826 (plus 60 page Bibliography). ISBN 0-943855-44-6. OCLC 49606900.
- Manley, Brent; Horton, Mark; Greenberg-Yarbro, Tracey; Rigal, Barry, eds. (2011). The Official Encyclopedia of Bridge (7th ed.). 6575 Windchase Blvd., Horn Lake MS 38637-1523: American Contract Bridge League. pp. 634 (plus additional 399 pages in CD format) totalling 1033 pages. ISBN 978-0-939460-99-1.

== See also ==
Encyclopedic bibliographies on bridge
