= Rixi Markus =

Austrian-British bridge player

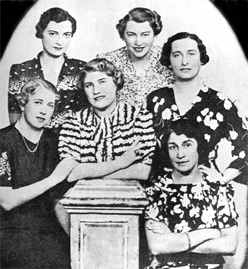
The victorious Austrian ladies' team at the 1937 World Championship: Rixi Scharfstein top left. Other members, from left: Marianne Boschan, Gertie Brunner, Ethel Ernst, Elizabeth Klauber, Gertie Schlesinger (seated).

"Rixi" Markus MBE (27 June 1910 – 4 April 1992) was an Austrian and British international contract bridge player. She won five world titles, and was the first woman to become a World Grand Master within the World Bridge Federation. "In a 60-year career", Alan Truscott wrote in a bridge column 15 weeks after her death, "she had far more victories with partners of assorted nationalities than anyone else has ever had." Her mantra at bridge, and the title of one of her books, was "Bid Bodly, Play Safe". She was appointed a Member of the Order of the British Empire (MBE) for services to bridge in the 1975 Birthday Honours.

== Life ==
Markus was born Erika (Rika) Scharfstein into a prosperous Austrian Jewish family in Gura Humorului, Bukovina. Now in Romania, Bukovina was a duchy in the Austro-Hungarian Empire from 1775 to 1918.

In 1916, her family fled, ahead of the Russian advance, settling in Vienna. After finishing school in Dresden she returned to Vienna, where she first made her name at the bridge table. Married young, and disastrously, she devoted herself almost entirely to bridge.

In 1938, she fled Austria after German forces entered Vienna (the Anschluss). Markus then made her home in London, where she remained for the rest of her life. She worked as a translator for the Red Cross during World War II and became a naturalised British citizen in 1950.

Her husband, Salomon Markus, also came to London. He opposed her efforts to gain independence in every way he could, and fought her for custody of their daughter Margo. Divorce was not simple in those days, but Markus obtained a judicial separation and a subsequent divorce in 1947. She described in her autobiography three subsequent long-term relationships with men: first Standish Booker, a leading bridge player, then Wash Carr (Walter Copley Carr) of the News of the World, and lastly Harold Lever (Lord Lever), a senior Labour Party politician.

== Bridge career and personality ==
Brilliant, intense and argumentative are amongst the mildest adjectives used to describe her presence at the table.

At the Vienna Bridge Club she became the protégée of Dr. Paul Stern, inventor of the Vienna System of bidding and leader of Austria's European champion teams. Soon she was one of the best women players, a 1935–1937 member of the Austria Ladies team that won three European and one world teams championship. After the Anschluss of Germany and Austria, both Rixi and Stern escaped to London (separately).

In 1950 Markus qualified to play for Britain by virtue of her naturalisation. Her first partnership was with Lady Doris Rhodes, a good player who had played on "Pops" Beasley's British team in its 1933 match with the Culbertson team. Markus–Rhodes played together in the "Ladies" flight of the European teams championships in 1951 (Venice) and 1952 (Dún Laoghaire or Dunleary), winning both times, and in a 1953 tour of the United States where they played in two victorious matches against the American ladies team.

However, it was Rixi's partnership with Fritzi Gordon in the European championships of 1955 (Amsterdam) that led to her dominance of the female game in Europe. Excitable and voluble, their post-mortems could often be heard many tables away. She was the same in partnership with the great male players such as Boris Schapiro and Giorgio Belladonna, but her friends knew her to be generous and loyal. In her autobiography Markus made her attitude to Gordon clear:

"As early as 1945 Paul Stern pointed out Fritzi Gordon to me, saying 'There is the partner for you.' I was not enthusiastic. For one thing, I already had a more than satisfactory partner in Doris Rhodes, a good friend, and for another I suspected that Mrs. Gordon and I would not hit it off socially, whatever we did at the table. My opinion did not change when she played at the Hamilton Club and I got to know her better. [But] as far as bridge is concerned, I have not a word of complaint about Fritzi Gordon, for she was a wonderful player and an excellent partner, who contributed greatly to my own success."

Victor Mollo wrote of their partnership: "Where Rixi Markus is fiery, Fritzi Gordon is icy cold. Where Rixi takes her contracts by storm, Fritzi makes hers through merciless efficiency ...".

Markus was captain of the winning team at Monte Carlo in 1954 against formidable opposition from all over the world: her team-mates were Konstam, Dodds, Reese, Schapiro and "Plum" Meredith. After their victory, Reese and Konstam decided to ask the British selectors to include Markus in their team for the European championships at Montreux that year, but the selectors did not choose her for either the Open or Ladies teams (the reasons are not known). The Open team played with the lesser player Jordanis Pavlides in her place, because their other regular team members such as Pedro Juan were not available. That team won the European and later the Bermuda Bowl trophies. In effect, a bizarre decision by the selectors cost her the European and World teams championships in the Open category. She had other disappointments; this was not the only time she was dropped from the Ladies' team, often when her results were quite outstanding.

"In 1969 we were robbed of victory in Oslo [European championships] by the inefficient and ludicrous handling of a technical offence. After we had been declared winners and the results posted on the notice-board a protest about late play early in the match was made. The event ended in complete confusion, but in 1970 the official program listed France as the 1969 champions."

Markus was bridge correspondent of The Guardian for 37 years and of the London Evening Standard after 1975, and she wrote a dozen bridge books including her autobiography. Generally recognized as the top European woman player, she was the first woman to become a WBF World Grand Master and was the leading woman in the WBF masterpoints rankings from their inception in 1974 until 1980. She was named International Bridge Press Association Personality of the Year in 1974, and was appointed MBE for contributions to bridge a year later. For many years she organized an annual match between the two Houses of Parliament.

She died of a heart attack on 4 April 1992 at the age of 81. Her daughter, the film actress Margo Lorenz, had predeceased her in 1976.

=== Player record ===
World championships

1937 Ladies Teams (Austria)
1962 Mixed Teams (Great Britain), 1st Pairs Olympiad
1962 Women Pairs, 1st Pairs Olympiad
1964 Women Teams (Great Britain), 2nd Olympiad
1974 Women Pairs, 4th Pairs Olympiad

World runners-up

1970 Women Pairs, 3rd Pairs Olympiad
1970 Mixed Pairs, 3rd Pairs Olympiad
1976 Women Teams (Great Britain), 2nd Venice Cup
1976 Women Teams (Great Britain), 5th Olympiad

European championships

Women Teams: 1935, 1936, 1937 (Austria), 1951, 1952, 1959, 1961, 1963, 1966, 1975 (Great Britain)

Other

- 1957 Master Pairs
- 1961 Gold Cup

== Publications ==
=== Memoirs ===
- A Vulnerable Game: the memoirs of Rixi Markus, Markus and David Mountfield (Collins, 1988) OCLC 59776035

=== Others ===
- Bid Boldly, Play Safe (London: Blond, 1966)
- Aces and Places: the international bridge circuit (Secker and Warburg, 1972); US ed. 1973, NY: Drake Pub
- Common-sense Bridge (The Bodley Head, 1972)
- Bridge Around the World (Bodley, 1979)
- Improve Your Bridge (Bodley, 1979)
- Play Better Bridge (1979)
- Bridge-table Tales (1980)
- Bridge with Rixi (1983)
- More Deadly than the Male: first lady of bridge (Faber and Faber, 1984)
- Best Bridge Hands (1985)
- The Rixi Markus Book of Bridge (1985)
- Better Bridge for Club Players, Terence Reese and Markus (Gollancz/Crawley, 1989)
