= Richard Lederer (bridge player) =

Richard Lederer (1894–1941) was a bridge player, writer and club owner.

== Biography ==
Born in Bohemia when it was part of Austria-Hungary, (Note: Some sources have him as Hungarian but Ramsey, who knew him well, says he was born in Bohemia which, though part of the Austro-Hungarian Empire at the time, was not part of Hungary.) he settled in London. He was described by the Official Encyclopedia of Bridge as "the first great figure in British bridge". He was a "physically imposing man with personality to match". He was a member of the teams that won the Gold Cup in 1933, 1934 and 1939, and he represented Britain in the 1934 Schwab Cup challenge match against Ely Culbertson's American team. Before he tired towards the end of the match, he is said to have run rings round Culbertson. According to Guy Ramsey: "he was perhaps the most difficult opponent of all time. You could never be certain whether he was going down four or making an over-trick."

During World War I, his knowledge of German meant that in 1916–1917 he was employed by the British army at a listening post only 200 metres away from the enemy lines, eavesdropping on their telephone conversations. After the war he became a jewel merchant in Hatton Garden. In the mid-1920s, he fractured his hip, which kept him away from work for a year, after which his growing fascination with bridge meant that he turned to it as his sole way of making his living.

Initially only playing rubber bridge, in 1932 he watched part of the final of the 1932 Gold Cup. Very unimpressed by what he saw, he decided he could put together a team of rubber bridge players capable of beating the best duplicate bridge specialists, and duly did so the following year.

He was selected for the Great Britain teams that competed in the European Bridge Championships of 1933 and 1935. He made three appearances in the Camrose Trophy for England in 1937–1939, two matches being won and one lost. He won the Tollemache Cup in 1934 and the National Pairs the following year. His usual partner was Willie Rose, whom he partnered in the Schwab Cop and the 1935 European Championships among other events.

A number of top players, including Maurice Harrison-Gray, Terence Reese, Kenneth Konstam and Adam Meredith, honed their game at his eponymous club Lederer's in the late 1930s. Reese wrote of him: "I played part of my first season with Dick Lederer himself. He was a fine, instinctive, but also very experienced, player, and I learned a lot from him." In 1939, the club had to move to smaller premises and was renamed the Tyburn, Reese observing that "Dick was a big man in every way, but business-like he was not."

He became the first Honorary Secretary of the English Bridge Union. He was bridge editor of the Sunday Referee.

After Richard's death, his widow Peggy took over the running of his club. His son, Tony Lederer, was also a successful player, who in 1945 instituted the Richard Lederer Memorial Trophy in his father's memory.

He developed his own bidding system, the Lederer Two Clubs, and promoted it in the book Lederer Bids Two Clubs, published by Williams and Norgate (London) in 1934. He also wrote Modern Contract and Duplicate, published by Williams and Norgate in 1936. However, according to Richard Fleet, Jack Marx told him that both books were actually written by S.J. Simon.
