= Nico Gardener =

British bridge player, teacher, and writer (1906–1989)

Nico Gardener (né Goldinger, 27 January 1906 – 10 December 1989) was a British international bridge player and a leading bridge teacher in London and on cruise ships.

== Life ==
Nico (Nehemi) Goldinger was born in Riga, Latvia, then part of Imperial Russia, into a wealthy Jewish family. After the Russian Revolution (1917) his family moved to Ukraine, and then to Moscow, where he trained as a ballet dancer. He later moved to Berlin, where he read languages and history at Berlin University, and played chess. His father had been a banker, but in Germany the family became timber merchants. He moved to London in 1936, where he began a career in bridge. Nico changed his surname to Gardener after he settled in London and became a naturalised British citizen.

Gardener married Pat Hyman (c. 1920–1988), who was also an international player, competing in three European women's championships. Their daughter, Nicola Smith (born 1949), became one of the leading British woman bridge players from 1975 onwards.

Nico founded the London School of Bridge in 1952 in the King's Road, Chelsea, above a frock shop. There he supervised the bridge teaching and the rubber bridge rooms where beginners could practice at the game for small stakes. The teachers were some of the best players in the country, and there were about 2000 students each year. The school survived his death, but no longer exists. Another of Nico's ventures was the bridge cruise, of which he was an early promoter. Each summer would find him hosting on a Mediterranean cruise ship. Gardener was multi-lingual, capable of conducting lessons and practice in Latvian, Russian, German, French, Italian and English.

One of Gardener's established partners was the outstanding and prolific bridge writer Victor Mollo, a contemporary whose family fled Russia after the 1917 revolution. Together they produced two classic books.

== Bridge career ==
Gardener's partners in bridge competition included some of the great players of the day, such as Pedro Juan, Victor Mollo, Louis Tarlo, Iain Macleod and Adam Meredith. As a tournament player he won World Mixed Teams in 1962 with Boris Schapiro, Rixi Markus and Fritzi Gordon. He won the European Championship twice out of five attempts, and competed in two Bermuda Bowls (1950 and 1962) and the 1960 Olympiad.

In domestic bridge he won the Gold Cup six times, firstly in 1946, and the Waddington Master Pairs in 1953. He won the Sunday Times Invitational Pairs in 1970 with Tony Priday; this prestigious tournament featured some of the world's strongest partnerships. He also played rubber bridge for many years at Lederer's club and at his own London School of Bridge.

== Publications ==
- Mollo, Victor; Gardener, Nico (1955). Card Play Technique or the Art of Being Lucky (1st ed.). London: George Newnes Limited. OCLC 21982767. 381 pages.
- Bridge for Beginners, Mollo and Gardener (Duckworth, 1956), 160 pp. OCLC 59030213; US ed. 1960, A.S. Barnes
- Master Bridge (Macmillan, 1983), 140 pp. – Macmillan in association with Channel 4. OCLC 16595486
