= Maurice Harrison-Gray =

British bridge player and writer (1899–1968)

Maurice Harrison-Gray (13 November 1899 – 24 November 1968), known always as 'Gray', was an English professional contract bridge player. For about thirty years from the mid-thirties to the mid-sixties he was one of the top players. As a member of the Great Britain national team he won the European Bridge League championships in 1948, 1949, 1950 and 1963. He was from London.

== Early life ==
Gray, born Maurice Charles Harrison Gray on 13 November 1899 at Ingatestone, Essex, was the child of an English father and an American mother. Much of his childhood was spent in Paris, and he became bilingual. He was educated at Haileybury School and served in the British Army at the end of World War I. In his younger days he boxed, played rugby and tennis, rode motorcycles, but leg injuries stopped his sporting activities. During World War II he was a flight lieutenant in the Royal Air Force. Later, he became an ardent lepidopterist, breeding tropical moths at his Hampstead home.

Gray later used the surname Harrison-Gray and after leaving Haileybury School he joined the family brewing business. When the company was taken over he turned to writing, at first fiction but he soon became a full-time writer about bridge.

== Bridge career ==
Gray turned to bridge at 30 after a series of accidents at sports, including a motor-bike accident at 100 mph. Within three years he was bidding for Britain in radio matches against the US and Australia.

Gray participated in the development of the Acol System of bidding, He was captain of the winning Acol team in the years before World War II, the other team members being his partner, S.J. (Skid) Simon, Jack Marx, Iain Macleod and Colin Harding: a stellar group indeed. Gray was also instrumental in helping, in 1938, to unite the two warring bridge organisations, the British Bridge League (founded in 1931) and the National Bridge Association (founded in 1933).

After the war the line-up of the British teams generally included Boris Schapiro, Terence Reese, Kenneth Konstam, Leslie Dodds, and Edward Rayne, initially with Gray as captain. These teams won the European title three times running. In London, 1949, the England team of Gray, Konstam, Reese and Schapiro defeated the American team of Crawford, Rapee, Stayman and Leventritt by 2,950 points over 96 boards for the Crowninshield trophy. A British team captained by Gray, but without Reese and Schapiro, were defeated by the US in the first Bermuda Bowl.

To summarise, Gray was European champion in 1948, 1949, 1950 and 1963. He led Britain in the Bermuda Bowl in 1950, and played in the World Pairs 1962, World Team Olympiad 1964 and the European Championships in 1958. He won the Gold Cup seven times, and many other national events. The first time, in 1937, was with the original Acol team; the last time in 1968 was with Tony Priday, Nico Gardener, Albert Rose and the Sharples brothers: also a star-studded team.

Like many other players of his day, Gray played rubber bridge almost daily. He used his bridge columns to champion the losing trick method of evaluating hands for suit contracts. Gray was bridge editor of the Evening Standard and Country Life for many years.

=== 1951 withdrawal ===
In 1951, Gray's career as an international was interrupted for about seven years after he withdrew from the trials at an early stage, leaving his partner high and dry, and announced his retirement from international competition, without giving reasons. Thus, he did not play in the 1951 European championship, but he gave a lengthy account of it in a press report, which attacked the performance of the British team (who came third to Italy and Austria). An editorial in the English Bridge Union's official medium gave an unforgettable response:

"One article in particular makes us very hot under the collar and that is the one in the European Bridge Review under the name of Harrison-Gray ... We have searched closely for one single word of praise, but in vain ... Surely he could have brought out the fact that they finished joint second on VPs [Victory Points], and scored more IMPs [International Match Points] and lost fewer than any other country, and that had the result been decided on IMPs they would have been easy winners.
"Perhaps everything is accounted for by the statements of Mr Gray himself:

'Although unable to make more than token appearances in the playing room [he admitted he saw only one hand out of 3,460 played through to the end] ... my impressions are gleaned from a number of reliable judges.' "

This was a strange performance from Gray, especially given his motto for playing at the table, which was "Keep icy calm". The response from the British Bridge League, responsible for team selection at European and World events, was: "The British Bridge League have decided that Mr Harrison-Gray will not be considered for selection in the team to represent Great Britain in the European Championship in 1952." He did not play again for Britain until Oslo 1958.

According to Richard Fleet, his long-term bridge partner Jack Marx wrote after his death:

Like many talented people, he was apt to be touchy at even implied criticism of his talent; and disagreements on impersonal issues were apt with him to become personal disputes. These failings perhaps accounted for his long and sterile feud with the BBL.

=== Schapiro's opinion ===
In 1951 Boris Schapiro wrote an article giving his opinion of the top players of the day. This was his assessment of Gray:

"Brilliant dummy player, very good defender, inclined to overbid in competitive situations but always liable to 'slip a contract through'. Concentration poor; difficult to play against."

Eleven years later, Schapiro updated his article:

"Gray must be the best player over 60 and he is still a great force at the bridge table."

== Family life ==
Gray married Stella Sonia Soltz on 1 January 1938, they did not have any children. On 24 November 1968 Gray died of heart failure at his home in Hampstead, London.

== Publications ==
- Winning Points at Match-Point Bridge, Norman Squire and Gray (London: Faber & Faber, 1959), 151 pp., OCLC 2555668
- The Losing Trick Count (Hounslow: Bibliagora, 1961) and 1983 (revised)
- Shortcut to Expert Bridge, Alan Truscott and Gray (Slough: W. Foulsham & Co., 1967) OCLC 504634851 – "Revised by M. Harrison-Gray."
- Country Life Book of Bridge, posthumous (Country Life, 1972), large format hardcover; (London: Hamlyn, 1973), ISBN 978-060031755-5, OCLC 826376758 – collection of Gray's articles in Country Life from 1954 to 1968, selected by Jack Marx
- The Best of Gray: The Country Life Book of Bridge revisited (High Wycombe: Five Aces, 1999), ISBN 978-0-9536752-1-0, paperback, OCLC 44932116 – collection of Country Life articles edited and updated by Raymond Brock
