= Richard Lederer =

Richard Lederer may refer to:

- Richard Lederer (writer)
- Richard Lederer (musician)
- Richard Lederer (bridge player)
