= Easley Blackwood =

Easley Blackwood may refer to:

- Easley Blackwood Sr. (1903–1992), invented the Blackwood convention used in bidding in contract bridge
- Easley Blackwood Jr. (1933–2023), his son, professor of music, concert pianist, and composer
