= Konstam =

Konstam is a surname. Notable people with the surname include:

- Angus Konstam (born 1960), Scottish author and historian
- Anna Konstam (1914–1982), British theatre and film actress
- Kenneth Konstam (1906–1968), English bridge player
- Phyllis Konstam (1907–1976), English film actress
