= Perroux =

Perroux is a surname. Notable people with the surname include:

- François Perroux (1903–1987), French economist
- Carl'Alberto Perroux (1905–1977), Italian contract bridge official, founder and long-time non-playing captain of the Blue Team, the most successful team in bridge history
