= Barry Rigal =

English and American bridge player, author, commentator and journalist

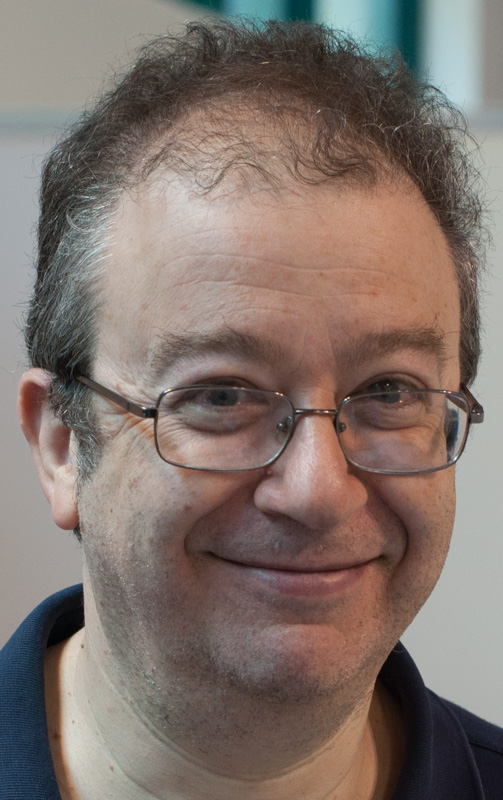
Barry Rigal, June 2014

Barry Rigal (born 1958) is a bridge player, author, commentator and journalist. Born in England, he was married to world champion Sue Picus and lives in New York.

Rigal has represented England in the Camrose Trophy Home International series five times and won the Gold Cup; he was a multiple winner of the Spring Fours and Tollemache Trophy.

Rigal has been a Vugraph commentator for thirty years and chief commentator for the European Bridge League (EBL) and World Bridge Federation (WBF) since 2006. He has been an executive member of the International Bridge Press Association (IBPA) since the early 1990s and was appointed President in September 2016.

== Publications ==
Rigal edited Bridge for Dummies, was co-editor of the seventh edition and a contributing editor of the sixth edition of The Official Encyclopedia of Bridge and author of Card Games for Dummies.

Rigal has written for the World Championship Book for two decades. Rigal's books include a series called Breaking the Rules and books on declarer and defender deception. He is a regular contributor to Bridge World in the US and Bridge Magazine in the UK. He is also a columnist for the American Contract Bridge League (ACBL) and regularly contributes to the Daily Bulletins at national championships. Particulars follow:

- — (2010). Breaking the Bridge Rules - First Hand Play. Toronto: Master Point Press. ISBN 978-1-897106-54-9.
- Francis, Henry G.; Truscott, Alan F.; Francis, Dorthy A., eds. (2001). The Official Encyclopedia of Bridge (6th ed.). Memphis, TN: American Contract Bridge League. ISBN 0-943855-44-6. OCLC 49606900.
- Manley, Brent; Horton, Mark; Greenberg-Yarbro, Tracey; Rigal, Barry, eds. (2011). The Official Encyclopedia of Bridge (7th ed.). Horn Lake, MS: American Contract Bridge League. ISBN 978-0-939460-99-1.
- Rigal, Barry; Donn, Josh (November 15, 2013). More Breaking the Rules: Second Hand Play. HNB Publishing. ISBN 978-0982887431.

== Bridge accomplishments ==
=== Wins ===
- Gold Cup (1) 1991
- North American Bridge Championships (2)
  - Keohane North American Swiss Teams (1) 2005
  - Chicago Mixed Board-a-Match (1) 2000

=== Runners-up ===
- Gold Cup (1) 1987
- North American Bridge Championships (1)
  - Keohane North American Swiss Teams (1) 1994
