= WBF Open Ranking =

This is a list of the top ten bridge players in the world according to the World Bridge Federation 'Open Ranking' by Master Points (MPs) as maintained by the World Bridge Federation. Master Points earned more than one year ago are reduced annually by 15%. The list also includes the player's lifetime accumulation of Placing Points (PPs). Accordingly, the table data is time sensitive and represents the standings based upon their recent performance as current on the WBF website as of July 30, 2022.

WBF Open Classification (July 2022)
Rank	Name	Country	MPs	PPs
1	Pierre Zimmermann	Switzerland	3105	36
2	Piotr Gawrys	Switzerland	2905	42.5
3	Michal Klukowski	Switzerland	2904	27
4	Bauke Muller	Netherlands	2733	31
5	Simon de Wijs	Netherlands	2711	23
6	Sjort Brink	Switzerland	2461	27
7	Bas Drijver	Switzerland	2452	27
8	Tor Hellness	Norway	2409	56.5
9	Geir Helgemo	Norway	2164	50
10	Frank (Nick) Nickell	USA	2007	43.5

Most points are earned by national teams of four to six players, some by transnational teams or by pairs, almost none by individuals.
