= Jordanis Pavlides =

Jordanis Theodore Pavlides (Greek: Ιορδάνης Θεόδωρος Παυλίδης; Iordanis Theodoros Pavlidis; 12 October 1903 – 26 February 1985) was a Greek-British contract bridge player who won the British Bridge League Master Pairs in 1948, the Gold Cup in 1949, the European championship in 1954, and the Bermuda Bowl in 1955. He also represented Britain in the European championships of 1955. Pavlides was the sixth member of a winning team whose other members were Terence Reese, Boris Schapiro, Kenneth Konstam, Leslie Dodds and Adam Meredith.

He was born in Athens, lived for a while in France and Germany, before settling in London in 1935. He became a British subject in 1951. He died in Westminster, London in 1985.
