= Sam Gold (bridge) =

Canadian bridge player

Sam Gold was a Canadian bridge player.

Sam Gold was the second Bridge Life Master in Canada.

Gold was most active during the 1939 to 1946 when currency laws made it difficult to play in the USA.

Gold is a member of the Canadian Bridge Federation Hall of Fame.
