= Adam Meredith =

British professional bridge player

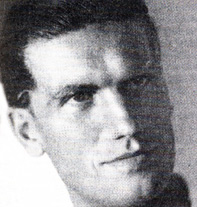
Meredith in his early twenties c. 1935

Adam Theodore "Plum" Meredith (16 June 1913 – 30 January 1976) was a British professional bridge player and world tournament champion.

== Early life ==
Meredith was born in Bangor, County Down, Ireland, to Hugh Meredith and Olive Christabel Margaret Meredith (née Iles). Little is published about his early life, excepting that he was well educated.

Fearlessly honest, he refused to claim his ill-health from severe asthma and acute diabetes as a basis to avoid military service for World War II and instead registered as a conscientious objector. Initially allocated to work as an ambulance driver and ARP warden, he was petitioned against by those who objected to working with "conchies" (conscientious objectors) and was reassigned to farm work, highly problematic for an asthmatic. It was "no secret, however, that for a great deal of the war he was in London; and when he was in London, he was playing cards." After the war, he spent months each year in the south of France where the dry climate helped his asthmatic lungs.

Meredith was passionately artistic with interests in ballet and theatre. When the Ballet Nègre (a creation of Katherine Dunham) came to London "and teetered between success and failure ... he backed it with hard-earned savings he had amassed at bridge".

Terence Reese referred to Meredith as "even-tempered, a staunch friend in an undemonstrative way, and quite immovable when he took up a position about anything."

Meredith was semi-retired from tournament play in 1957 when he moved from London to New York. There, he formed a friendship with Ruth Sherman, a leading American player, who supported his bridge activities and who upon her death in 1965 bequeathed to him the income on the bulk of her $450,000 estate.

According to an obituary bridge column by the English expatriate and expert, Alan Truscott, Meredith played rubber bridge but little tournament bridge in the US and "the last ten years of his life were sad ones, marred by progressive ill health". He died in New York City in January 1976. "in obscurity" when alcoholism further reduced his vitality and shortened his life.

== Bridge career ==
Meredith was a bridge professional who played rubber bridge for a living and high-level competitive tournament duplicate.

Meredith was a key member of the British team "doing as much as anyone to win the world championship match in 1955" – the Bermuda Bowl. He won the European Championship in 1949 and 1954, the Gold Cup five times (1948, 1950, 1952, 1953 and 1956) and the Master Pairs in 1949 and 1951.

Even though he co-wrote one book with Leo Baron, The Baron System of Contract Bridge in 1948, he was not a writer, journalist or teacher of bridge. Plum did not play the Baron system in the Bermuda Bowl victory. He was one of the four players who played CAB, the system favoured by Konstam, Dodds and Pavlides. (Note: The Bermuda Bowl was then contested in a head-to-head match between teams from Europe and North America. According to Truscott, Meredith "played without a rest" until the match had been decided, the first 208 deals, as the "partner in rotation" of Konstam, Dodds, and Pavlides.) Meredith was also quite au fait with Acol.

His personal honesty extended to his bridge career. He created a precedent when he withdrew from a British team on the grounds that a pair from a continental team were cheats. Others also thought so but had nevertheless played.

At bridge he liked to seize the initiative early in a match; some of his bidding manoeuvres (which often centred round the spade suit) became legendary. He was also a remarkable dummy player. Regarding his fondness for the spade suit, Victor Mollo wrote: "No man, no three men, for that matter, have bid spades so often or so devotedly as Plum." Mollo also wrote that he "has been known to play brilliantly after despatching eleven glasses of green Chartreuse". He was once heard to say of an opponent: "She had an enormous bag full of knitting. How could I think she was going to psyche?"

=== Opinions by other players ===
In his 1945 book Why You Lose at Bridge, S. J. Simon rated Meredith as "one of the best money bridge players in the country [i.e. England]".

In 1951, Boris Schapiro gave his opinion of Plum in a bridge magazine article:

At times rightly described as a genius, definitely the best player of difficult hands in the country, very good bidder (when not indulging in some particular idiocy), superb dummy player and defender. Concentration medium, easy to play against, mainly owing to slowness.

In his 1976 obituary of Plum, Terence Reese wrote:

When I first played at Lederer's in the mid-1930s, Meredith was a handsome youth of 22, though he looked about 17 . ...He was a marvellous player and ... had a reputation for eccentric bidding ... only because he sometimes wearied of the orthodox. ...He spent his last fifteen years or so in America.... It was not, perhaps, a satisfactory life for so brilliant and charming a person; but certainly it possessed colour, warmth and humour.
