= Jack Marx (bridge) =

British bridge player (1907–1991)

John Charles Hubert Marx (12 April 1907 – 29 August 1991), known as Jack Marx, was a British international bridge player who was instrumental in developing the Acol bidding system.

== Life ==
Marx was born in Willesden, London. He went to Repton School, and served as a captain in the Royal Army Service Corps during World War II.

As a competition bridge player he was a genuine expert, though not the most pragmatic player. Marx was a modest man and widely loved; indeed, he was one of the few bridge players who never made an enemy. He did not, however, have an equable temperament, and that limited his career as an international player.

Marx was a member of the Harrison-Gray team, and played as Gray's partner to win the European Bridge League championship teams-of-four for Great Britain in 1950, but he turned down the chance to play in the inaugural Bermuda Bowl world championship the same year:

"A moody man, subject on occasion to sudden fits of apathy ... a nervous, highly-strung man who will, quite suddenly and for no apparent reason, decline to play in a previously arranged match ... He was compelled to refuse the Bermuda Bowl match on grounds of health; and any long marathon taxes him severely."

Despite his temperament, Marx won the Gold Cup in 1937 and 1947, and once more in 1971 after Gray's death.

Though he never wrote a bridge book, Jack contributed many articles to bridge magazines, compèred many bidding competitions, and appeared on many bidding panels. He held a variety of administrative positions in bridge organisations, and was a British Bridge League selector for many years. After a stroke in the 1970s he recovered sufficiently to play regularly at the London Duplicate Club, but no longer played in major competitions. In his later years, he was known among players of a younger generation as "The Headmaster", and to the less reverent young players of a still younger generation as "Big Daddy Acol".

Marx died in Haringey, London, in 1991.

=== The Acol system ===
Marx is often said to be the first player to devise the idea of bidding 2C over 1NT to ask for 4-card major suits, though it is known that Ewart Kempson had used it in the early thirties. Marx worked out his version in 1939, before the Stayman convention was invented, but published it only in 1946, so losing priority to the American Sam Stayman. Marx also devised a "Byzantine 4NT" that was more complex but more informative than Blackwood.

His most important and lasting achievement was to co-operate with Skid Simon to build up the Acol system of bidding. Others were involved in this – Harrison-Gray, Iain Macleod, Terence Reese, Ben Cohen – but Marx and Simon were at the heart of it. They took the basic approach–forcing ideas of the American Culbertson System and modified it for greater effect when both pairs are bidding competitively. The other noteworthy source, according to Marx, was the 1933 writer "Criticus", whose identity is unknown:

"From him Acol took its characteristics of directness and aggression, [and] its reliance on broad principles supplemented by individual judgement rather than on meticulously framed rules of procedure. The composite product that resulted, though a hybrid, was a reasonably self-consistent whole."

Marx accepted the version of Acol published by Cohen and Reese, originally in 1938, calling it "an able, lucid and faithful presentation of our ideas", but was most unhappy about Reese's attempt to update the system in 1952.

"The universal reaction of those who have hitherto played the system ... has been one of bewilderment and dismay. What has happened, for instance, to the old Acol principle of limit bids?"

Marx objected most strongly to the section on responses to take-out doubles. Reese's text discusses (p94/5) a sequence after North makes a take-out double of West's one diamond bid and South jumps to two spades. The changes proposed by Reese included:

1. making the jump response to a take-out double forcing for one round unless the double was shaded, and
2. a subsequent jump to 4 of the agreed major by doubler would also be forcing, because a raise by doubler from two to three spades would not be passed by South.

The effect of making the jump response, and later double raise, forcing would have the effect of stretching the simple suit response to a take-out double from 0–8 points to 0–11 points. The Marx counter to Reese was entirely successful: Reese's idea never became part of Acol.
