= Valerie Westheimer =

American bridge player

- Occupation: Bridge player

Valerie Westheimer is an American bridge player.

== Bridge accomplishments ==
=== Wins ===
- North American Bridge Championships (7)
  - Machlin Women's Swiss Teams (2) 2000, 2003
  - Sternberg Women's Board-a-Match Teams (2) 2001, 2002
  - Smith Life Master Women's Pairs (1) 2010
  - Wagar Women's Knockout Teams (1) 2012
  - Whitehead Women's Pairs (1) 1998

=== Runners-up ===
- North American Bridge Championships (12)
  - Machlin Women's Swiss Teams (3) 1997, 2004, 2012
  - Sternberg Women's Board-a-Match Teams (4) 2000, 2003, 2007, 2008
  - Wagar Women's Knockout Teams (3) 2008, 2010, 2011
  - Whitehead Women's Pairs (2) 2007, 2009
