= Pat McDevitt =

Irish bridge player

Pat McDevitt is an Irish bridge player.

== Bridge accomplishments ==
=== Wins ===
- World Senior Pairs Championship (1) 2010
- North American Bridge Championships (4)
  - Senior Knockout Teams (1) 2000
  - Rockwell Mixed Pairs (1) 2012
  - Truscott Senior Swiss Teams (1) 2007
  - von Zedtwitz Life Master Pairs (1) 2005

=== Runners-up ===
- North American Bridge Championships (3)
  - Senior Knockout Teams (2) 2003, 2008
  - Truscott Senior Swiss Teams (1) 2008
