= Joan Eaton =

Canadian bridge player

Joan Eaton is a Canadian bridge player.

== Bridge accomplishments ==
=== Wins ===
- North American Bridge Championships (4)
  - Freeman Mixed Board-a-Match (2) 2012, 2014
  - Rockwell Mixed Pairs (1) 1998
  - [Canadian Women's Team Championships] (7) 1994, 2003, 2005, 2009, 2011, 2013, 2016 (www.cbf.org)
  - Whitehead Women's Pairs (1) 2003

=== Runners-up ===
- North American Bridge Championships (1)
  - Wagar Women's Knockout Teams (1) 2005
