= Piotr Gawryś =

Swiss bridge player

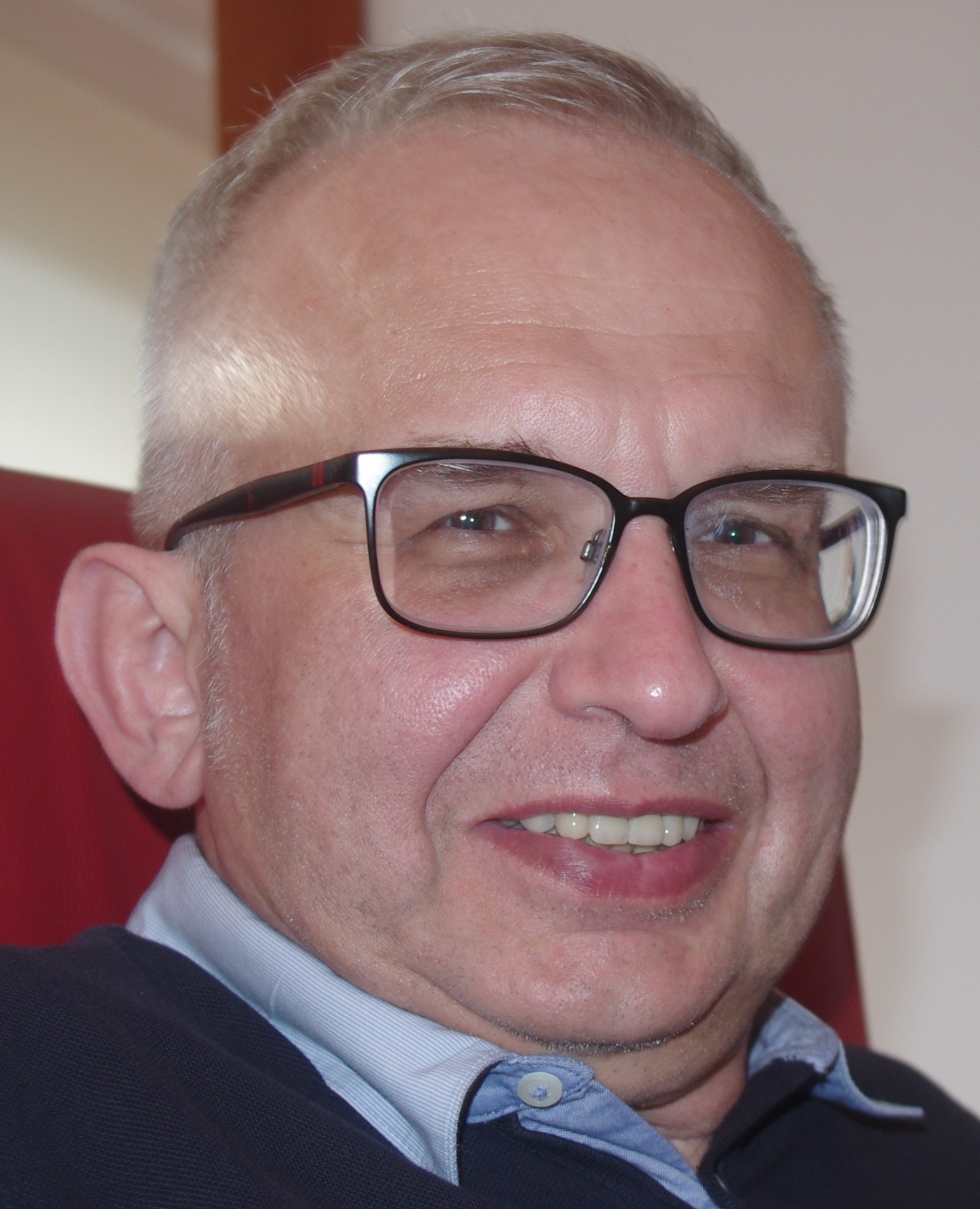
Piotr Gawryś in 2016

Piotr Gawryś (born 1955) is a Swiss bridge player. Gawrys, WBF Grand Master, has won 4 world championships; World Team Olympics in 1984, Transnational Mixed Teams 2000, Transnational Open Teams 2005 and Bermuda Bowl 2015. His other first places include; World Masters Individual in 1992 (the first time the event was held), European Teams Championships 1993 and European Open Pairs 1995. He was second in Bermuda Bowl 1991, Rosenblum Cup 1994, World Masters Individual 2000.
