= Ben Cohen (bridge) =

Ben Cohen (1907–1971) was an author, publisher, and distributor of contract bridge books and stationery supplies. He pioneered duplicate bridge in the UK in the early 1930s and helped develop the Acol bidding system in the mid-1930s. He and the young Terence Reese wrote the first, and for a long time the only, textbook of the Acol system, The Acol Two Club (1938). He also contributed to newspapers and journals in South Africa, India, and Japan as well as the UK. Cohen was from Hove.

Cohen and Rhoda Barrow edited the European Bridge Players' Encyclopedia, published 1967 and based on the American Official Encyclopedia of Bridge (1964).

== Publications ==
- Cohen, Ben and Terence Reese. January, 1938. The Acol Two Club: with an introduction by S.J. Simon. Leng, Sheffield.

• This was the first Acol textbook, its authors wisely disclaiming originality: "We do a job of reporting." It had a famous Preface, "Attitude of Mind" by Skid Simon.
• 2nd ed. revised and enlarged, February 1939. Second and subsequent editions titled The Acol System of Contract Bridge. Joiner & Steele, London.
• 3rd ed. June, 1946; with 13 hands from the Waddington Par Contest.
• 4th ed. November, 1949; with a selection of hands from the 1949 International Series. This edition introduced three new chapters on competitive bidding, mistakes to avoid, and two clubs over one no-trump (the Marx convention).
• 5th ed [1956?]; with a selection of hands from the 1955-56 international events and an Introduction by Guy Ramsey.

- Cohen, Ben 1953. Change to Acol. Allen & Unwin, London.
- Cohen, Ben 1960. Bridge quiz. Foyle, London.
- Cohen, Ben 1960. World Olympic bridge. Arco.
- Cohen, Ben. Solo Whist. Stanley Paul, London. 1960.
- Cohen, Ben 1962. Test your bridge: an anthology of posers and problems. Arco.

• Reprints the whole of the four par contests designed by Terence Reese and Skid Simon for Waddington in the late 1930s.

- Cohen, Ben and Rhoda Barrow. 1964. The ABC of Contract Bridge. Blond, London.
- Cohen, Ben and Rhoda Barrow. 1965. Calling a spade a spade – or, Acol in action. Blond, London.
- Cohen, Ben and Rhoda Barrow. 1965. Building better bridge: Acol for Americans. A.S. Barnes & Co.
- Cohen, Ben and Rhoda Barrow. 1967. The Bridge Players' Encyclopedia Paul Hamlyn, London.
- Cohen, Ben and Rhoda Barrow. 1969. All about Acol. Allen & Unwin, London.
- Cohen, Ben and Rhoda Barrow. 1969. Your Lead partner. Allen & Unwin, London.
