= Gianarrigo Rona =

Italian bridge administrator and lawyer (born 1940)

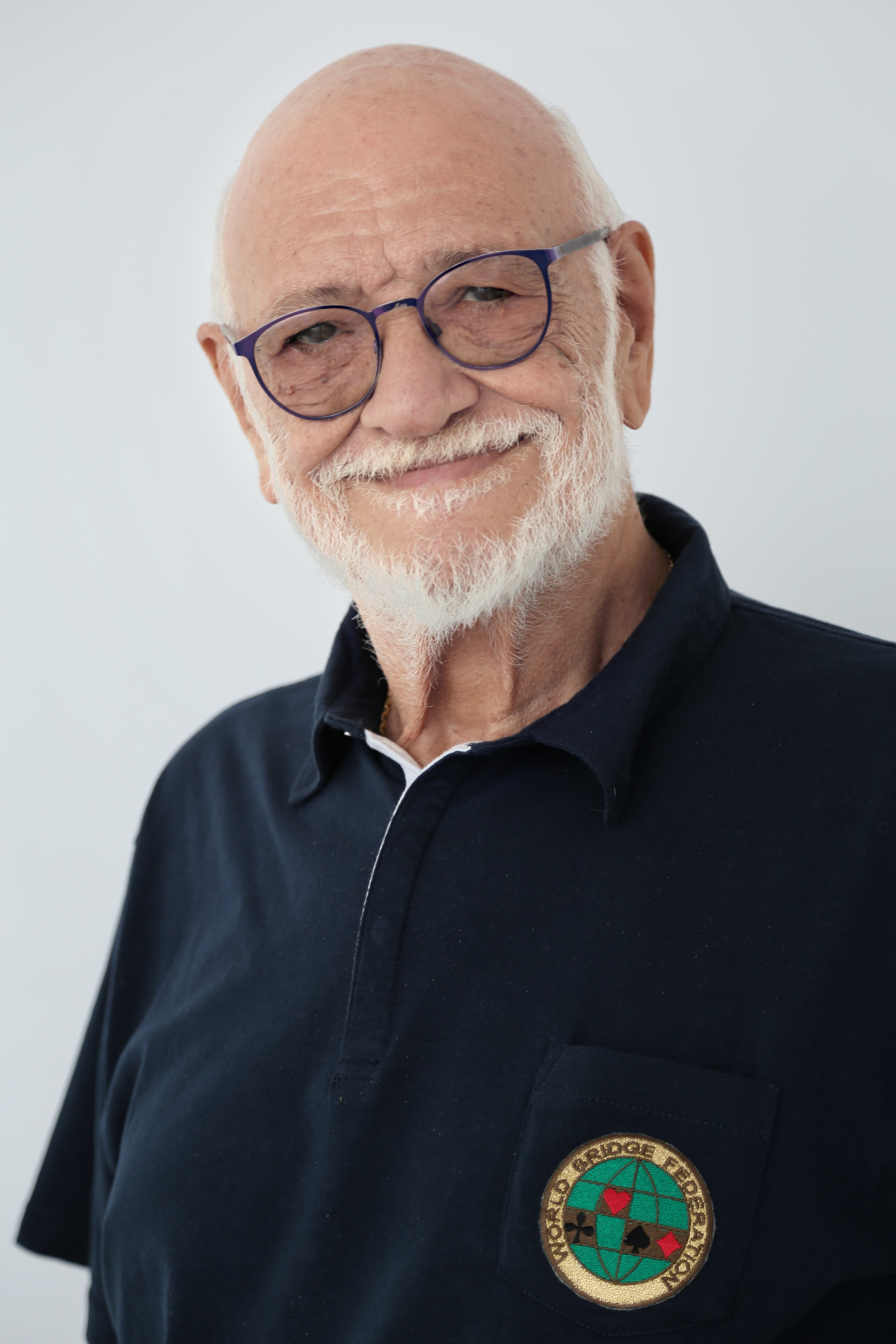
- Gianarrigo Rona
- Born: Gianarrigo Rona

Gianarrigo Rona (born 18 November 1940) is an Italian bridge administrator and lawyer. He is a former President of the World Bridge Federation (WBF).

Rona was born in Pavia in Lombardy, the third generation in the family of lawyers. He studied law at the Ugo Foscolo Classical Lyceum in Pavia and University of Pavia. In his youth, he played basketball in the Italy's First Division.

Rona is a practicing lawyer. He was a board member of the Italian Board of Lawyers for twenty years, and administered the National Lawyers' Pension Fund.

Rona played bridge at international level. His career in bridge administration began in 1979, when he was elected a board member of FIGB, Italian Bridge Federation. He was the president of FIGB between 1986 and 2009. He was the non-playing captain of the Italian open team between 1984 and 1985. As a chairman, Rona oversaw organization of multiple European and World championships, including EUBL Championships in 1979 and 1998, the European Open Pairs Championships in 1989, 1991 and 1995, the European Junior Teams Championship in 1982, of the European Open and Women's Teams in 1985, and the World Bridge Olympiads in 1988 and 1992, hosted in Italy.

On the European Bridge League (EBL), Rona served as a member of the Executive Committee (1995–), acting Treasurer (1997–1999) and finally the President (1999–2010).

Rona was Member of the WBF Executive Council and Management Committee since 1999, and first Vice President from 2006. In the São Paulo WBF meeting in 2009, he was elected President and took the chair in 2010, succeeding long-term tenure of José Damiani. He was re-elected twice: first time in 2013 in Nusa Dua, Bali, and the second time in 2018 in Lyon. His third term expired at the end of 2022, when he was succeeded by Jan Kamras and Rona became President Emeritus.

Rona resides in Milan with his second wife Cippi.
