= Jaime Ortiz-Patiño =

European golf club owner and official, contract bridge official and Swiss player

Jaime Ortiz-Patiño (20 June 1930 – 3 January 2013) was an art collector, golf course owner and former President of the World Bridge Federation.

== Life ==
Ortiz-Patiño was born on 20 June 1930 in Paris. His father Jorge Ortiz-Linares was Ambassador of Bolivia to France and his mother Graziella Patiño was the daughter of Bolivian industrialist Simón Patiño.

In his youth, Ortiz-Patiño was educated at Le Rosey and competed in several tennis tournaments including the French Open.

He served as the final President of Patiño Mining Company until 1982.

Ortiz-Patiño died on 3 January 2013 in Spain.

== Bridge ==
Ortiz-Patiño was a top international player, representing Switzerland, where he lived for many years, twice in the World Team Olympiad, and once each in the World Open Pairs, the Rosenblum Cup and the World Senior Pairs, becoming a World Bridge Federation World Life Master. He also played in eight European Championships and won many Swiss national titles.

He was President of the World Bridge Federation from 1976 to 1986.

== Golf ==
Ortiz-Patino acquired Valderrama Golf Club in 1984. He took a lifelong interest in course maintenance and trained himself to the point where he oversaw day-to-day greenkeeping of Valderrama. In 1999, he received the Golf Course Superintendents Association of America’s Old Tom Morris Award, the maintenance industry’s highest honor.

Valderrama became a masterpiece and his legacy, ultimately hosting the 32nd Ryder Cup in 1997.
