= Raymond Brock =

Leading English bridge player and member of Great Britain team

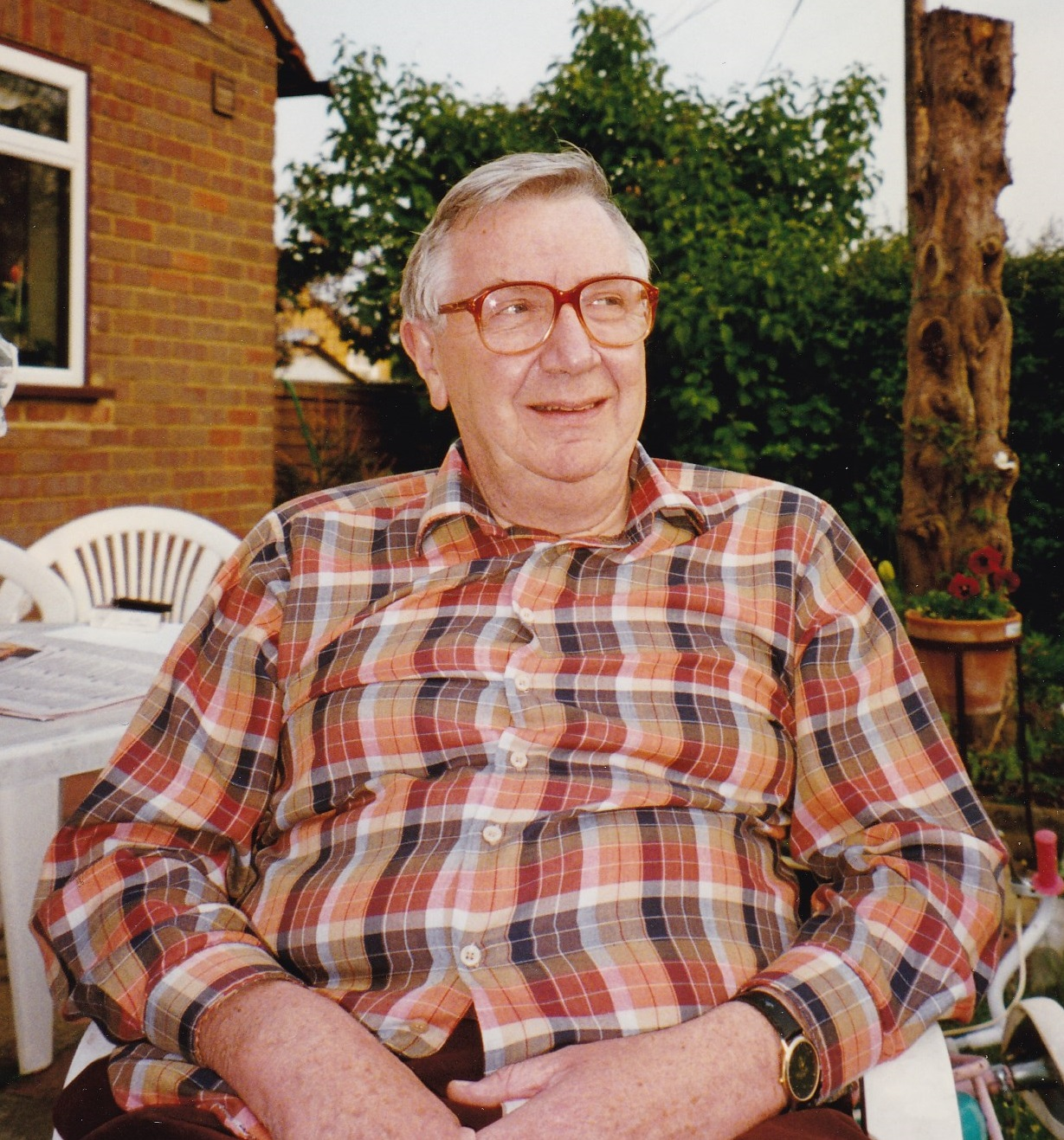
Raymond Slater Brock

Raymond Slater Brock (14 October 1936 – 1 January 2008) was a leading English bridge player and then a long-time administrator. He was a member of the Great Britain team that finished second in both the 1987 European Bridge League championship and the 1987 Bermuda Bowl world championship, and fifth in the 1988 World Team Olympiad. This success came during his partnership with Tony Forrester, which lasted from 1982 to 1990. He achieved the rank of World International Master through his performances.

Brock was educated at Manchester University and became a physics teacher at a Manchester school. A subsequent job as a computer manager with Honeywell took him to Glasgow from 1968 to 1975. While living there he played seven matches for Scotland; three times during that span the team won the Camrose Trophy, for which England, Scotland, Wales and Northern Ireland compete (subsequently Ireland too). His international bridge career had begun in 1960 partnering Roy Higson of Lancashire. Before and afterward he played for England, with 26 appearances for the country in all. Additionally on four occasions he was non-playing captain of the England team, as well as serving as a selector. He won the Gold Cup, the premier British domestic competition, seven times.

He was twice President of the British Bridge League and was non-playing captain of many Great Britain teams, including the bronze medal winning Women in the 1980 World Team Olympiad and the gold medal winning Juniors at the 1989 World Championships. He did much coaching of the best young players, and in 1994 was non-playing captain of the British Junior team that won the European Championships and went on to win the World title the following year.

He wrote several books, in particular on defence, a part of the game at which he was especially expert. These include Planning the Defence (1996) and Expert Defence (1997). While with Honeywell at Brentford, Middlesex in the late seventies and early eighties, some of his early bridge writing included chapters on the Stayman convention. His vacations during this time were spent at Monte Carlo playing bridge with the likes of Omar Sharif.

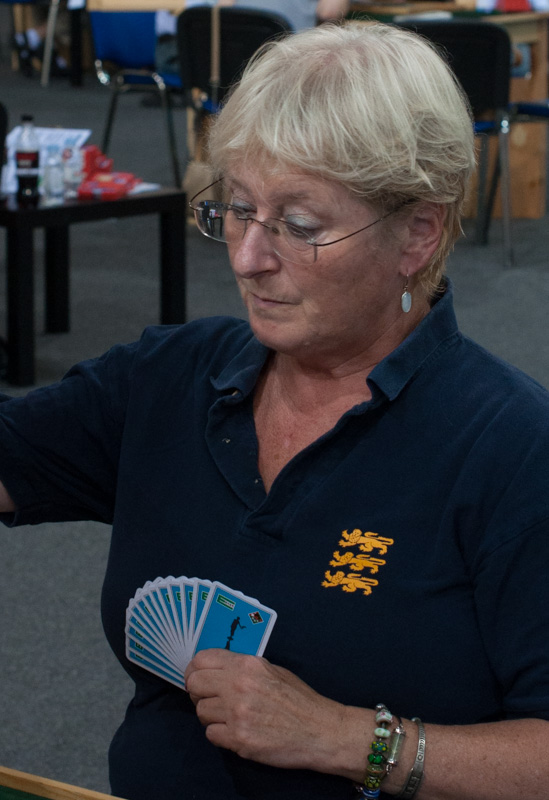
Sally Brock

He died of cancer. His widow Sally Brock is an international bridge player; they married in 1993 and had two children. Together they won the England Mixed Teams event on six occasions and the British Mixed Pairs twice.

== Books ==
- Step-by-step Planning the Defence (London: B. T. Batsford, 1996) OCLC 34974267
- Step By Step Expert Defence (Batsford, 1997)
- No Trump Play (Batsford, 1998)
- Expert Tuition for Tournament Bridge, Brock and Brock (Batsford, 1998) OCLC 41839577
- Slams, Brock and Brock (Batsford, 1999), Bridge Quiz series OCLC 41072217
- Defence, Brock and Brock (Batsford, 2000), Bridge Quiz series OCLC 45329457
- Great Hands I Wish I Had Played, Sally and Raymond Brock (Batsford, 2002) OCLC 50582503
