= Easley Blackwood Sr. =

American bridge player (1903–1992)

Easley Rutland Blackwood (June 25, 1903 – March 27, 1992) was an American contract bridge player and writer, best known for the Blackwood convention used in bridge bidding.

== Biography ==
Blackwood was born in Birmingham, Alabama, but lived most of his life in Indianapolis, Indiana. From 1968 to 1971 he was executive secretary of the American Contract Bridge League (ACBL). He was inducted into the ACBL Hall of Fame in 1995.

His son was Easley Blackwood Jr. (1933–2023), a noted composer of music.

== Publications ==
Books

- Bridge Humanics: How to Play People as well as the Cards (Indianapolis: Droke House, 1949); UK title, 1951, The Human Element in Bridge [same subtitle]
- Blackwood on Bidding: Dynamic Point Count (Bobbs-Merrill, 1956)
- Blackwood on Slams (Prentice-Hall, 1970); later title, Bidding Slams with Blackwood
- Spite & Malice: The Complete Rules and Strategy (Cornerstone Library, 1970)
- Contract Bridge Complete by Ernest W. Rovere (Simon & Schuster Fireside Books, 1975) – contributor
- How You Can Play Winning Bridge, with Blackwood (Los Angeles: Pinnacle Books, 1977)
- Play of the Hand with Blackwood (Los Angeles: Corwin Books, 1978)
- Winning Bridge with Blackwood, Blackwood and Derek Rimington (London: Robert Hale, 1983) – revised, British edition of How You Can Play ..., 1977
- The Complete Book of Opening Leads (Devyn, 1983)
- Card Play Fundamentals, Blackwood and Keith Hanson (Devyn, 1987)

Pamphlets

- The Blackwood Convention (Louisville, KY: Devyn Press, 1981) – Championship bridge series, no. 2
- Introduction to Declarer Play (Devyn, 1989) – Future champions' bridge series, no. 8

== Bridge accomplishments ==
=== Awards and honors ===
- International Bridge Press Association Personality of the Year, 1984
- ACBL Hall of Fame, 1995

== See also ==
- List of contract bridge people
