= Boris Schapiro =

British international bridge player

Boris Schapiro (22 August 1909 – 1 December 2002) was a British international bridge player. He was a Grandmaster of the World Bridge Federation, and the only player to have won both the Bermuda Bowl (the world championship for national teams) and the World Senior Pairs championship. He won the European teams championship on four occasions as part of the British team.

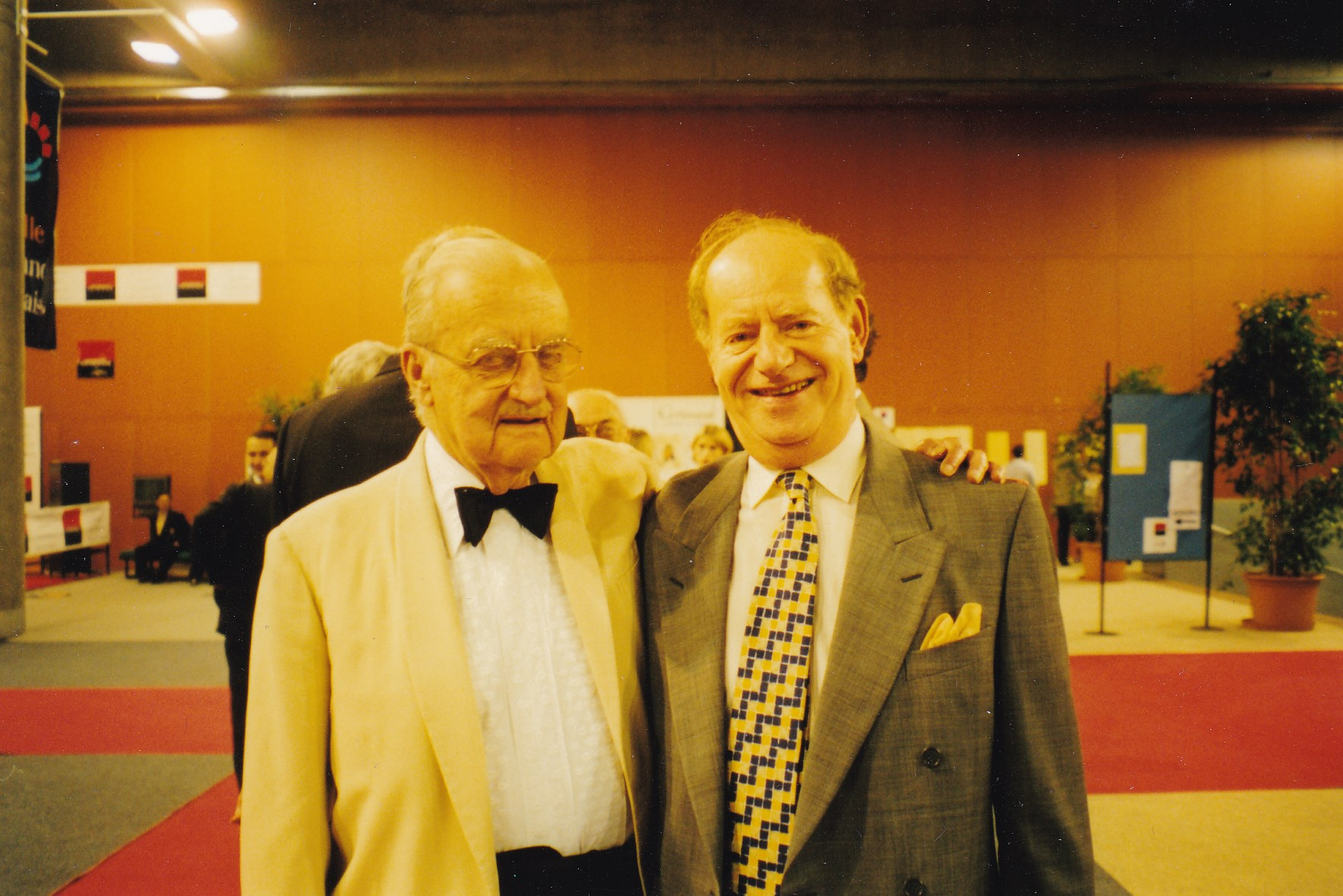
Boris Schapiro (left) and Irving Gordon, winners of the Senior Pairs, 10th World Championships in Lille, France. Schapiro is wearing the same jacket that he wore decades previously when he won his first world championship.

== Life ==
Schapiro was born in Riga, Latvia (then part of the Russian Empire) into a prosperous family of Jewish traders. They emigrated at the time of the Russian Revolution, when he was eight years old, and soon settled in England. He was educated at Clifton College and Bradford Technical College in England and at various universities, including the Sorbonne in Paris.

After graduating, Schapiro joined the family horse trading and meat business and worked there until his forties, when he retired to capitalise on his love of gambling by becoming the banker of a baccarat syndicate at Crockford's gaming club in London. He was fluent in Russian, German and French, and used those linguistic skills in the Army Intelligence Corps during World War II.

In 1935, while he was working in Hamburg, his fluency in German led to his being chosen as the interpreter for Viscount Castlerosse when the latter travelled to Berlin to research an article for the Daily Express. In a restaurant, a group of Brownshirts mistook Castlerosse for a Jew and Schapiro for a non-Jew, and abused Castlerosse for drinking with an Aryan. A fight broke out, and as a result Schapiro spent two nights in prison, after which he hastily returned to Britain.

Schapiro had an early marriage to a Russian woman. He later married a second time, to Helen, in 1970.

== Bridge career ==
At age ten in England, Schapiro started playing bridge for money at school. His first major tournament was in 1929, when he went to the US to partner Oswald Jacoby in the World Auction Bridge Pairs Championship. The two players were destined to have great and lengthy careers in the coming world of contract bridge, where Schapiro's first recorded victory was in the World Pairs Championship of 1932, also with Jacoby. (This was before the foundation of the World Bridge Federation, 1957, which has sanctioned all "World" tournaments for many years.)

Schapiro's entry into serious competitive bridge in Britain was delayed until the end of the war. His partnership with Terence Reese, which started in about 1944, was the basis of his most outstanding period as a player. He was also successful with other partners, the last of which was Irving "Haggis" Gordon. Schapiro's bidding in competitive situations was quite outstanding, and his commentary was featured in bridge magazine bidding competitions round the world. Bidding judgement and card-play in defence were the strengths of his game, relative to other experts.

"The characters of Reese and Schapiro were very different. At the bridge table Reese was the cold calculating machine, driven by logic, but witty and good-natured away from it, though with an acerbic phrase when needed. Schapiro was the player of flair; excitable, always on the move, irascible at the table and often grumpy away from it. He did not mellow with old age. At the 1999 European Senior Teams, opponents who called the referee in a vain attempt to protect Schapiro's partner from verbal abuse were told there were special dispensations in standards of behaviour for any competitor over the age of 90."

=== Major tournament successes ===
Schapiro won many tournaments. His first major win at teams was Britain's Gold Cup in 1945/46, partnered by Iain Macleod. He won the Gold Cup eleven times in all, at the time a record, and his last win came at the age of 88 in 1997/98, a remarkable 52 years after his first and 33 years after his penultimate success.

Britain won the world championship for teams in 1955 with Reese and Schapiro, Konstam and Dodds, Meredith and Pavlides, beating the US in the final. It is the only Bermuda Bowl win for a British team.

Schapiro also won the World Mixed Teams in 1962. At the age of 89 in 1998, he won the World Senior Pairs partnered by Irving Gordon. He was second in the inaugural renditions of both quadrennial open world championship tournaments under the WBF, the World Team Olympiad of 1960 and the World Open Pairs of 1962. He also represented Britain in the 1964 Olympiad and the Bermuda Bowl of the same year, which was played early in 1965, and in ten European Bridge League national teams championships, winning in 1948, 1949, 1954 and 1963.

Although the British team had won the Bermuda Bowl in 1955, Schapiro's 1965 experience was altogether different.

=== Buenos Aires affair ===
In the 1965 Buenos Aires Bermuda Bowl, B. Jay Becker noticed Schapiro and his partner, Terence Reese, holding their cards in unusual ways during bidding, the number of fingers showing indicating length of the heart suit. A number of players and observers, including Dorothy Hayden, New York Times columnists Alan Truscott, John Gerber, British nonplaying captain Ralph Swimer, British Bridge League Chairman Geoffrey Butler, ACBL president emeritus Waldemar von Zedtwitz, and ACBL President Robin McNabb, all watched Reese and Schapiro and were convinced that they were signalling illegally. It was also confirmed that Reese was not using such signals while playing with his other partner, Jeremy Flint. At a hearing held at the tournament site in Buenos Aires, the World Bridge Federation (WBF) judged Reese and Schapiro guilty of cheating, and announced that due to "certain irregularities", the British team was forfeiting the matches they had already won against North America and Argentina, and that Reese and Schapiro would not be playing in the remaining matches.

The British Bridge League (BBL) subsequently convened their own enquiry, chaired by Sir John Foster, barrister and Member of Parliament, and General Lord Bourne. After hearing lasting many months, including a surprise revelation by Swimer that Schapiro had confessed his guilt to him, the "Foster Enquiry" found insufficient evidence to find Reese and Schapiro guilty beyond reasonable doubt. Without rebutting the "direct" evidence that grips were correlated with heart count, the report emphasized that there was inconclusive evidence that the players had benefitted from the signals in their bidding or play.

In 1967, the BBL asked the WBF to reverse their guilty finding; the WBF responded by unanimously reaffirming their guilty verdict, and later reiterating that they would not accept a British team including Reese and Schapiro for the 1968 Olympiad, which the BBL boycotted in protest. In 1968, a compromise was reached, the WBF maintaining their guilty verdict, but allowing Reese and Schapiro (who had announced his retirement from international bridge after the Buenos Aires Olympiad) to play in future world championships.

Subsequently, both Reese and Alan Truscott published books on the scandal. Reese's book stated: "The basis of the charge, as everybody knows, is that Schapiro and I communicated length in hearts to one another by means of illegal signals. If you want to support that charge by reference to the hands played, what you have to show is that a number of illogical, uncharacteristic, and implausible bids or plays were made that can be explained only on the basis that the players had improper knowledge of one another's hands." It then goes on to argue for the logic of the pair's bidding and play on the various hands from the Olympiad. Truscott's book emphasizes the unlikelihood of the observed variations in finger signals being coincidental, or of such a large number of witnesses colluding to fabricate the evidence.

In May 2005, the English journalist David Rex-Taylor, a bridge player and publisher, claimed that Reese had made a confession to him forty years earlier, one that was not to be revealed until 2005 and after he and Schapiro were dead. The purported confession claimed that Reese and Schapiro were indeed signalling, but only to show that such signaling was possible (and so were not actually paying attention to each other's signals), purportedly as part of a book on cheating (which was abandoned after the scandal broke). Although this explanation could conceivably reconcile the use of finger signals with the absence of evidence from bidding or play, there is no corroborating evidence to support this account. In contrast, Schapiro's widow claims he continued to deny the accusations to his death.

=== After 1965 ===
Schapiro was bridge correspondent of The Sunday Times from 1968 until his death in 2002. Despite his facility with language, he was never really interested in writing; his output was two small books, and it is likely that his newspaper column was often ghosted. He made his mark as a player and a personality.

The Buenos Aires affair removed at a stroke the central activity of his life. It took years for Schapiro to be rehabilitated in world bridge, although he was always held in high esteem in Europe. He did eventually return to international bridge competition, unlike Reese, and did so with considerable success (above).

Schapiro's 90th birthday party in London was attended by Jaime Ortiz-Patino, the WBF President Emeritus and the owner of Valderrama Golf Club, who had been a witness for Reese and Schapiro in the BBL enquiry; Omar Sharif, the Egyptian film star and bridge player; Prince Khalid Abudullah of Saudi Arabia, a family friend; and many personalities from the bridge and casino worlds.

=== Anecdotes ===
Schapiro's conversation at the bridge table was either a delight or a nuisance, depending on taste and point of view.

His standard greeting to females – "What about a spot of adultery?" (or "Fancy a spot of adultery?") – is mentioned in every biographical note and obituary, and reveals his sense of humour. When his team played an exhibition match at Leicester, the wife of the Chief Constable organised a cocktail party for them to meet the locals. The traveling players were invited to sign and comment in the Visitors book, and Schapiro wrote the catchphrase after his signature. Dimmie Fleming – another international player and the only woman to play on the British open team – defused the situation by signing next, drawing an upwards arrow and writing, "But will he ever be adult?"

Another story shows his partner Terence Reese picking up a collection of silver cup trophies from Schapiro's flat in Eaton Place (the Upstairs, Downstairs setting) and carrying them in a pillow-case. Stopped in the street by a policeman and asked to explain his unusual sack of possessions, Reese led the officer back to the flat so that Schapiro could validate his explanation. When Schapiro answered the door, he sized up the situation, and when asked "Can you identify this man?", said "Never seen him before in my life."

== Books ==
- Bridge, Card by Card (London: Hamlyn, 1969), Terence Reese and Schapiro OCLC 463320531
- Bridge Analysis (US edition, New York: Sterling Pub, (c) 1976), 187 pp. LCCN 76-1167
- Boris Schapiro on Bridge (London:Pitman, 1976), 190 pp. LCCN 77-354245
