= Carl'Alberto Perroux =

Italian contract bridge official

Carl'Alberto Perroux (also Carlo Alberto; 20 November 1905 – 20 August 1977) was an Italian contract bridge official, the founder and long-time non-playing captain of the Blue Team, the most successful team in bridge history. As Blue Team captain he won 8 Bermuda Bowls, 1 World Team Olympiad and 3 European Bridge League teams championships in the period from 1951 to 1966.

Perroux was born in Mirandola, Modena, in 1905, the son of Alberto Perroux and Enrica Maramotti Perroux. A criminal attorney in private life, he was the captain of the team through 1950s and early 1960s. He was the main craftsman of the team's cohesion and spirit, both by supporting and consoling, and by exhorting and forcing. He was known for imposing tough discipline: players who broke the rules were unconditionally benched, regardless of short-term benefits. He even checked whether the team members went to bed alone and on time during tournaments.

Perroux was the president of Italian Bridge Federation from 1952 to 1967, when he retired to Brazil and began helping Brazilian players.

He wrote one book, The Blue Team – Our Story of Bridge, whose revised and enlarged edition was published in 1973.

== Books ==
- Il "Blue team" nella storia del bridge (Nuova interamente riveduta e ampliata ed.). Milan: U. Mursia. 1973. p. 450. LCCN 74309076.
- Carl'Alberto Perroux e la scuola modenese (PDF) (in Italian). Modena. 2018.
