= Mark Horton (bridge) =

British bridge journalist and player (born 1950)

Mark Howard Horton (born 22 February 1950) is a British bridge journalist, expert player and chess champion. He was the editor of Bridge Magazine from 1995 until it ceased publication at the end of 2017, and then became the editor of its purely online successors, first A New Bridge Magazine and subsequently BeBRIDGE. He currently lives in Bath with his partner Liz.

== Chess accomplishments ==
Horton was a chess player who as a Junior represented England and subsequently played for Great Britain in the European Team Correspondence Championship, winning the gold medal on his board as the team took the bronze. He penned a series of articles and booklets on Opening theory and American legend Bobby Fischer used one of his suggestions to win a game against Russian Mark Taimanov on his way to the World title. His one full-length book on chess, published in 1977, is French Defence 1.

== Bridge career ==
Horton developed an interest in bridge in the early seventies. Chess has taken a back seat ever since, and in 1993 he ended his law career to pursue bridge-related interests full-time. He was fortunate to live in Nottingham, which was the home of International Popular Bridge Monthly and thus provided opportunity to listen, learn and play with the pick of England's players including Tony Sowter, Tony Forrester, Graham Kirby, Brian Senior and Sally Brock.

On the advice of Forrester, Horton formed a partnership with Richard Winter and they rapidly rose to the top, winning in rapid succession a host of major events in Britain including the Life Master Pairs, the Grandmaster Pairs, Crockford's Cup and the Spring Foursomes. Their success earned them invitations to overseas events and they won both the famous Hoechst Team tournament and the Dunhill Cup. They represented England on numerous occasions and were on the "Great Britain" team in Albuquerque for the 1994 world teams championship (Rosenblum Cup, not a national teams tournament).

It was in that same year that Mark was asked by Patrick Jourdain to work at the European Mixed Championships in Barcelona – the only snag was that it meant that he would not be allowed to play. He decided to accept and when Jourdain announced at the end of the event that he wanted to retire from working on the Bridge Bulletin, the European Bridge League (EBL) appointed Horton its Chief Editor, a post he has held ever since.

In 1995 he was invited to become Editor of Bridge Magazine, the world's oldest bridge publication (since in May 1926) and he has been doing that ever since. He started writing bridge books, and is now well into double figures. His latest, Misplay these Hands with Me, has earned rave reviews and was short listed for the 2008 Master Point Press Book of the Year award, which his book I Love This Game, with Sabine Auken, won in 2006.

Although his partnership with Winter came to an end, Mark continued to play in international events. He has won events in numerous countries, including Australia, France, Germany, the Netherlands, Romania, the United States, Portugal, Egypt and Malta.

It was in Malta that he met Rabbi Leonard Helman, and they formed a professional partnership until Rabbi Helman died in 2013. They were in the prize money in Malta, and ever since they have played in two or three events a year, at the ACBL Nationals and in some overseas events. A couple of years ago they won the Polish Team Championships in Sopot along with their regular Bulgarian teammates Vladi Isporski, Valentin Kovachev and Victor Aronov.

He has been an editor for numerous Daily Bulletins at tournaments, including the World Team Championships in Shanghai in 2007. "No international tournament is complete without his presence as bulletin editor."

== Controversies ==
In about 2000, an unidentified third party downloaded a contacts database from a computer belonging to the International On Line Bridge Club Limited (IOBC) onto floppy disc and passed it to Horton. Horton passed it to E-Bridge Inc, a US based competitor of IOBC. IOBC instructed solicitors to take steps to protect their confidential information. Horton settled out of court for undisclosed costs and damages.

On 24 July 2018, he was publicly accused of having committed multiple plagiarisms in his journalistic articles, including unacknowledged borrowings from Wikipedia.

== Publications ==
- French Defence 1 (about chess), The Chess Player, 1977
- Petroff Defence : A Line for White (about chess), The Chess Player, 1980, ISBN 0 906042 20 8
- For Love Or Money, with Brian Senior, Master Point Press, 2000
- —— (2000). The Mammoth Book of Bridge. New York: Carroll & Graff Publishers Inc. ISBN 0-7867-0691-0.
- The Bridge Magicians, Master Point Press
- The Hands of Time, Master Point Press, 2004
- 25 Conventions for Acol Players, Master Point Press 2005
- I Love this Game, with Sabine Auken 2006
- Bridge Master vs. Bridge Amateur, Master Point Press, 2007
- Misplay these Hands with Me, Master Point Press, 2007
- Duplicate Bridge at Home, Master Point Press, 2008
- The Pocket Guide to Acol Bridge, Master Point Press, forthcoming in 2009
- ——; Van Cleef, Jan (2010). The Mysterious Multi: How to Play it, How to Play Against it. Toronto: Master Point Press. ISBN 978-1-897106-56-3.
- ——; Rodwell, Eric (2011). The Rodwell Files. Toronto: Master Point Press. ISBN 978-1-897106-67-9.
- —— (2014). Better Signalling Now. Toronto: Master Point Press. ISBN 978-1-77140-025-1. A revision of ''Step-by-step Signalling'' published by Batsford, 1994
