= Leslie Dodds =

British contract bridge player

Leslie William Dodds (2 February 1903 – 1975) was an English international bridge player and, by profession, an import-export merchant, from London. He was a member of the British team which won the Bermuda Bowl in 1955. In his youth he was a chess player, and famous for feats of memory and mental calculations.

== Bridge career ==
Dodds' first partner in post-World War II top events was Edward Rayne, who became, by royal warrant, shoe-maker to the Queen. Then he partnered Kenneth Konstam: together they formed one of the finest partnerships in British bridge. They played in the British Bermuda Bowl victory of 1955, and in the European Championship victories of 1948, 1949, 1950 and 1954. Dodds also represented Britain in the first Bermuda Bowl (1950), and the European Championships of 1952, 1953 and 1955; won the Gold Cup in 1938, 1949, 1956, 1960 and 1961 and the Master Pairs in 1955.

His bidding system was CAB, one of half-a-dozen natural systems developed in Britain during the 1930s. CAB, invented by G.G.J. Walshe, was further developed by Dodds, who became its 'prophet'. The system featured ace-showing in response to the artificial game-forcing 2C opener plus Blackwood and strong 1NT openers. Jump raises and 2NT responses were forcing except in competition, opening three bids in minor suits invited 3NT (solid suit or near-solid with outside entry). The general tenor of the system was closer to the Standard American of the day than to Acol; The CAB system, rarely played today, was the 'house' bidding system of the Hamilton Club, one of the high-class London rubber bridge clubs at the time. According to Mollo, Dodds used to win some £4,000 a year at the Hamilton, a huge sum in the 1950s.

His bridge career was cut short by a cerebral haemorrhage (stroke) in 1961.

=== Schapiro's opinion ===
In 1951, Boris Schapiro gave this view of Dodds:

"Brilliant dummy player and defender. The writer personally does not agree with his bidding methods. Very difficult to play against but concentration is bad."
