= Victor Mollo =

British contract bridge writer (1909–1987)

Victor Mollo (17 September 1909 – 24 September 1987) was a British contract bridge player, journalist and author. He is best known for his "Menagerie" series of bridge books, which consist of fable-like stories of caricatured people with animal names and mannerisms playing the game.

== Biography ==
Mollo was born in St. Petersburg into a wealthy Russian-Jewish family. The October Revolution happened when he was eight and his family fled Russia, travelling by a purchased train, with forged Red Cross papers, crossing into Finland, then Stockholm, Paris and finally London.

Mollo attended Cordwalles School but neglected his studies and devoted himself to bridge. As an editor in the European service of the British Broadcasting Corporation, he began to write books and articles on the game. After retirement in 1969, Mollo started to write even more extensively, and he wrote up to his death in 1987. He wrote 30 books and hundreds of articles. He was also active in developing bridge cruises, mostly in the Mediterranean. He died in London.

Mollo's life style was exceptional. He would play rubber bridge at his club each afternoon, enjoy a dinner and wine with his wife, whom he referred to as "The Squirrel", and then work all night until 6 am, when he would take a brief sleep. While Mollo occasionally successfully competed in the major duplicate bridge tournaments, winning four national titles, he preferred rubber bridge. Many of his daily achievements at the rubber bridge table would become elements of fictional stories written later in the night.

== Menagerie series ==
The Bridge in the Menagerie series started with the book of the same name, originally published in 1965, which had several sequels on the same theme. (Most of the pieces in the books had previously appeared in either the British Bridge Magazine or the American The Bridge World – see the Acknowledgement section in the various books.) Mollo was recognised as "the most entertaining writer of the game" in a poll among American players in the 1980s. The books describe entertaining events at a rubber bridge table in "The Griffins Club" (duplicate bridge features only occasionally), involving fictional characters, many of whom are nicknamed after the animals whom they most resemble both physically and psychologically, and who caricature common archetypes of real-life bridge players. Mollo often refers to the main characters by their initials. They include:

- Hideous Hog (HH), by far the club's best player, but also an insufferable shark who seeks to humiliate opponents for their mistakes
- Rueful Rabbit (RR), a small, timid man who can barely hold his cards together and can't always tell diamonds from hearts, but has such incredible luck that even the cards he accidentally drops (several at once, occasionally) become the right ones
- Secretary Bird, who knows the laws of the game perfectly and insists that they are applied to the letter, always to his own downfall
- Papa the Greek, a clever but exceedingly vain expert, who fancies himself as the Hog's superior despite regularly losing to him, and whose cleverness usually backfires against himself
- Karapet, an Armenian expatriate and a fine player, but the unluckiest one ever, usually Papa's partner
- Colin the Corgi, among the club's younger members, a strong player who is often sarcastic and testy and thus has "all the makings of a future master"
- Oscar the Owl, Senior Kibitzer at the Griffins, whose role is usually limited to acting as an audience for HH's exploits
- Peregrine the Penguin, Oscar's equivalent at the Unicorns, the Griffins' rival club
- Walter the Walrus, whose expertise in and devotion to the Work point count are matched only by the utter mess he makes of bidding and play
- Molly the Mule, the lone recurring female character, who is always certain that she is right and is as stubborn as the proverbial mule
- Timothy the Toucan, as hopeless a player as RR but without RR's engaging qualities. TT tries to make up for his shortcomings by means of an oozing deference to the Menagerie's better players.
- Charlie the Chimp would rather post mortem the last hand than play the next. He is an exponent of sharp practice at the table, once famously producing a remarkable (and impossible under normal bridge circumstances) quadruple squeeze against himself by retaining a small card to conceal his own revoke.

Five books were published in the series while Mollo was alive, all with subsequent editions and printings:

- — (1965). Bridge in the Menagerie: The Winning Ways of the Hideous Hog (1st ed.). London: Faber and Faber.
- — (1974). Bridge in the Fourth Dimension: Further Adventures of the Hideous Hog (1st ed.). London: Faber and Faber. ISBN 0-571-10634-X.
- — (1979). Masters and Monsters; The Human Side of Bridge (1st ed.). London: Methuen. ISBN 0-571-11317-6.
- — (1983). You Need Never Lose at Bridge: Happy Days in the Menagerie (1st ed.). London: Methuen. ISBN 0-413-52500-7.
- — (1987). Destiny at Bay: The Latest from the Bridge Menagerie (1st ed.). London: Methuen. ISBN 0-413-17150-7.

After Mollo's death, further books in the series appeared, some making use of previously uncollected articles and others containing new material by Robert and Phillip King:

- The Hog in The 21st Century by Phillip and Robert King, 1999 (London: B. T. Batsford)
- Winning Bridge in the Menagerie by 'Victor Mollo with Robert King', 2001 (London: Batsford)
- Bridge in the Fifth Dimension by 'Victor Mollo with Phillip and Robert King', 2002 (London: Batsford)
- Murder in the Menagerie by 'Victor Mollo with Phillip and Robert King', 2002 (London: Batsford)
- The Hog Takes to Precision by 'Victor Mollo, collected and edited by Mark Horton', 2011. (Toronto: Master Point Press). ISBN 978-1-897106-66-2
- Diamonds are the Hog's Best Friend by 'Victor Mollo', illustrated by Bill Buttle, 2013 (Toronto: Master Point Press). ISBN 978-1-897106-96-9
- Swings and Arrows by 'Victor Mollo', illustrated by Bill Buttle, 2014 (Toronto: Master Point Press). ISBN 978-1-771400-05-3
- Last Call in the Menagerie by 'Victor Mollo, collected and edited by Mark Horton', illustrated by Bill Buttle, 2015 (Toronto: Master Point Press). ISBN 978-1-77140-016-9

== Books ==
- Streamlined Bridge or Bidding without Tears. Illustrated by Anton (pseudonym). (London: David Marlowe, 1947), 264 pp.; 2nd ed. 1949, Christopher Johnson, 256 pp.; 3rd ed. 1954, George Newnes, 270 pp.; US ed. Streamlined Bridge, or Point-count Bidding without Tears (Prentice-Hall, 1956), 270 pp. OCLC 1556925
- Mollo, Victor; Gardener, Nico (1955). Card Play Technique or the Art of Being Lucky (1st ed.). London: George Newnes Limited. OCLC 21982767. 381 pages.
- Bridge for Beginners, Mollo and Nico Gardener (London: Gerald Duckworth, 1956), 160 pp. OCLC 59030213
- Bridge Psychology, or reading between the cards (Duckworth, 1958), 127 pp. US ed.: Bridge Psychology (New York: Barclay, 1958), 127 pp.
- Bridge: Modern Bidding (Faber and Faber, 1961), 124 pp. OCLC 753016705; 4th revised ed. 1978, London and Boston: Faber OCLC 4856811
- Bridge in the Menagerie: the winning ways of the Hideous Hog (Faber, 1965) – Menagerie #1
- Confessions of an Addict (Newnes, 1966) – autobiographical; no bridge hands
- The Bridge Immortals (Faber, 1967)
- Winning Double: A Quizbook and Textbook with 160 Problems – The Shortest Cut to Expert Play; a.k.a. Victor Mollo's Winning Double: the shortest cut to expert play (Faber, 1968); reissued as Victor Mollo's Bridge Quiz Book: the shortest cut to expert play (London: B. T. Batsford, 1998)
- Culbertson's Contract Bridge for Everyone, Ely Culbertson and Mollo (Faber, 1969), 123 pp. – "Revised, edited and with an introduction by Victor Mollo." OCLC 558089582 (Note: Contract Bridge for Everyone by Ely Culbertson, edited by Josephine Culbertson and Albert H. Morehead, 118 pp. (Philadelphia: John C. Winston Co, 1948) OCLC 25577717; (London: Faber, 1948) OCLC 437091972)
- How Good is Your Bridge? The short cut to expert play (1969)
- Bridge: Case for the Defence (Faber, 1970)
- Test Your Defence: where the points are won (1970)
- The Best of Bridge; an introduction to the Wohlin Collection, Mollo and Eric Jannersten (Faber, 1973)
- Bridge in the Fourth Dimension: further adventures of the Hideous Hog (Faber, 1974) – Menagerie #2
- Instant Bridge: a textbook from B to Z (Faber, 1975), illus. Lixi Darvall
- Bridge Unlimited: The Fateful Years (Faber, 1976)
- Defence at Bridge: 110 lessons by 120 champions, Mollo and Aksel Jørgen Nielsen (Faber, 1976)
- Bridge Course Complete: a new method of bridge tuition with over 200 quizzes (Faber, 1977)
- The Finer Arts of Bridge: a textbook of psychology (Faber, 1978)
- Masters and Monsters: the human side of bridge (Methuen Publishing, 1979) – Menagerie No. 3
- Streamline Your Bidding with 1100 quizzes (1979)
- Bridge à la Carte (London: Pelham Books, 1982), 158 pp. OCLC 16536510
- Winning Bridge (Methuen, 1983)
- You Need Never Lose at Bridge: happy days in the menagerie (Methuen, 1983) – Menagerie #4
- I Challenge You: Victor Mollo challenges you to improve your bridge game (Methuen, 1984)
- The Other Side of Bridge (Methuen, 1984)
- Tomorrow's Textbook (Methuen, 1985)
- The Compleat Bridge Player (Methuen, 1986)
- Destiny at Bay: The Latest from the Bridge Menagerie (Methuen, 1987) – Menagerie #5

Posthumous

See Menagerie series, above.
