= Kenneth Konstam =

Kenneth Walter "Konnie" Konstam (born Adolf Walter Konstam; 25 February 1906 – 21 May 1968) was an English international bridge player who won seven international titles. In 1955 he played on the only Great Britain team to win the Bermuda Bowl (the world championship) and he won more European Bridge League open teams championships than any other British player.

Konstam, educated at Oundle School, was employed for a time as a stockbroker in the London Stock Exchange. He was for many years an executive of the De La Rue company, which made playing cards, postage stamps and banknotes (the playing card business was eventually sold to Waddingtons). He served in the British Army during World War II, reaching the rank of Major. His fluent French qualified him to act as Liaison Officer to the French Army after D-Day.

== Bridge career ==
Konstam was a key member of the London-based Great Britain bridge team which won the Bermuda Bowl in 1955, the first occasion a European team had beaten the United States in this competition, and the only victory for a British team in this, the world championship for teams of four. His main partner in the event was Leslie Dodds. Konstam was described by Ramsey that year as "about the best pragmatic player in the game today". His bidding and play was rapid and direct in style; he was known for bidding borderline games, and for his acute tactical awareness at the table.

Konstam also represented Great Britain in the World Championship 1937; the Bermuda Bowl 1950, 1962, 1965; the World Olympiad 1964; and the European Championship 12 times (a record), winning in 1948, 1949, 1950, 1954, 1961, 1963 (the first six of Britain's seven wins). He won the Gold Cup five times: 1949, 1956, 1960, 1964 and 1965.

He was one of the proponents of a bidding system known as CAB, in which the responder to a strong artificial 2C opening immediately identifies an Ace in hand, if any. The 'B' stood for Blackwood; otherwise, the system was mostly natural, with strong no-trump opening bids, and forcing jump raises as in the older version of Standard American. He was bridge editor for the Sunday Times for many years.

Konstam also played rubber bridge, which for many years was a good source of income. He had one attribute not given to all experts, namely, a great ability to partner weaker players. Many clients were surprised and delighted to find themselves winning a tournament where they would normally be back-markers.

=== Schapiro's opinion ===
In an article written in 1951 Boris Schapiro said of Konstam:

"Superb dummy player and defender, erratic and undisciplined bidder; is liable to and does in fact 'bring in' a lot of points. Very difficult to play against but concentration is bad."

In 1962, he updated his article:

"He is still a most formidable opponent, a very good dummy player and superb defender. He makes mistakes nowadays but is fast and hard to get the better of. I still prefer him on my side rather than against me."

== Death ==
Konstam died in 1968 in Juan-les-Pins, France, where he had gone to partner Baron Egmont von Dewitz of Germany in an international tournament.

== Books ==
Konstam wrote two volumes in the Teach Yourself Books series.

- Teach Yourself Canasta (London: English Universities Press, 1951), 153 pp. OCLC 23275811
- Teach Yourself Card Games for Two (English Universities, 1954) 150 pp. OCLC 1350178 – with several reprints including Play and Win Card Games for Two (Toronto: Coles, 1978) OCLC 15817160

2nd edition, Card Games for Two, David Sidney Parlett and Konstam (Hodder & Stoughton; New York: David McKay, 1978), 177 pp. OCLC 7638591

- How to Play Calypso, or How to Play Calypso: the new British card game (London: Hodder & Stoughton, 1954), 71 pp. LCCN 54-41847
- Enquire Within: a history and guide to card playing, compiled by Konstam (London: Thomas De La Rue & Co., 1957), 72 pp. OCLC 28812001

Pamphlets

- The C.A.B. System of Bidding at Bridge (London: Sunday Times, 1959), 6 pp. – "a resumé by Kenneth Konstam" OCLC 66006356
