= List of contract bridge books =

Bridge, or more formally contract bridge, is a trick-taking card game of skill and chance played by four players. This article consists of lists of bridge books deemed significant by various authors and organizations.

== History ==
Books on bridge and its predecessor games have spanned centuries with the earliest known popular book on the subject of Whist having been published by Edmond Hoyle in 1742 or 1743.

The timelines in the evolutionary path to modern contract bridge books are generally as follows:

- 17th century: the emergence of Whist from earlier games such as Ruff and Honours and Triumph
- 18th and 19th centuries: Whist is widely played with many variants in scoring methods; similar games such as Vint and Khedive are also played
- 1886: Evidence that Bridge-Whist has emerged with John Collinson's four page pamphlet entitled Biritch, or Russian Whist. (Earlier, in 1869, Christian Vanderheid, an Austrian writer about card games, published Gründlicher Selbstunterricht zur Erlernung des Jarolasch oder das russische Whist (Extensive Self-teaching of Yeralash (Jarolasch) or Russian Whist). The game described by Vanderheid is almost identical to Collinson's Biritch, with the exception that it is not played with a dummy.)
- 1903–1932: from the first known publication on Auction Bridge (also known as Royal Auction Bridge and simply, Auction) to the last publication of Laws of Auction Bridge by the Portland Club
- c. 1915: Bridge Plafond emerges in France and Belgium and is essentially contract bridge without vulnerability
- late 1925: a significant new scoring system was proposed by Harold Vanderbilt introducing the concept of vulnerability, large bonuses for slams and heavy penalties for undertricks. Within two years, "Auction was swept off the tables" in the dawn of modern contract bridge.
- 1926–1935: numerous books on bidding are published and compete for status as the 'official system' of choice. Ely Culbertson rises to prominence in the US as a self-promoting bridge player, challenging his English and European counterparts to international matches all the while building a business empire based on his bridge writing and related investments. In the early Thirties, Acol is fashioned by S. J. Simon and Jack Marx, and eventually becomes the most popular bidding system in Britain.
- 1935: Culbertson publishes the first Encyclopedia of Bridge.

=== Precursor games ===
The following are books on the various precursor games to modern contract bridge; the first books on contract bridge appeared in 1927.

- Hoyle, Edmond (1743). A Short Treatise on the Game of Whist: Containing the Laws of the Game and also Some Rules... Bath, London: W. Webster. 86 pages. / London: Thomas Osborne, 10th Edition, 1750, 224 pages
- Hoyle, Edmond (1761). Mr. Hoyle's Games of Whist, Quadrille, Piquet, Chess and Backgammon Complete. Thomas Osborne, Stanley Crowder and Richard Baldwin (London), 12th Edition, 214 pages.
- Payne, William (c. 1770). Maxims for Playing the Game of Whist, with all Necessary Calculations; and the Laws of the Game. T. Payne & Sons (London).
- Mattews, Thomas (1804). Advice to the Young Whist Player: Containing Most of the Maxims of the Old School with Author's Observation on Those He Thinks Erroneous... Various editions to 1828. W. Meyler and Son (Bath), 4th Edition, 1810, 68 pages.
- Cavendish, pseudonym of Henry Jones, M.R.C.S. (1862). The Laws and Principles of Whist Stated and Explained and its Practice Illustrated on an Original System by Means of Hands Played Completely Through. (Spine title: Cavendish on Whist). Thos. De La Rue & Co. (London), 1st Edition. / 8th Edition, 1868, 120 pages; 9th Edition, 1872, 120 pages; 11th Edition, 1876, 268 pages; 12th Edition, 1879, 268 pages; 13th Edition, 1881, 268 pages; 15th Edition, 1885, 272 pages; 20th Edition, 1892, 303 pages; 21st Edition, 1893, 320 pages; 22nd Edition (The Seventy-fifth Thousand), 1895, 306 pages; 23rd Edition (The Eighty-sixth Thousand), 1898, 306 pages; 24th Edition (Containing the New Code of Laws Revised in 1900), 1901, 306 pages. American Editions published by: John Wurtele Lovell (New York), 1880 from the 12th English Edition, 257 pages; John Wurtele Lovell (New York), 1881 from the 12th English Edition, 257 pages; Charles Scribner's Sons, 1899 from the 23rd English Edition, 348 pages.
- Baldwin, J. L.; Clay, James (1864). The Laws of Short Whist and a Treatise on the Game (Spine title: Short Whist). Harrison (London). / Second Edition, 1870 / First American Edition: Henry Holt and Company (New York), 1874, 153 pages. / New American edition from the second English Edition, 1880, 163 pages.
- Pole, William (January 1871). Quarterly Review. Article on the evolution of Whist.
- Pole, William (1874). The Theory of the Modern Scientific Game of Whist... (Cover and spine title: Pole on Whist). Longmans, Green, and Co. (London), 7th Edition, 1874, 112 pages. / G.W. Carleton & Co. Publishers (London) 1879, 144 pages. / Longmans, Green, and Co. (London), 14th Edition, 1883, 112 pages. / G.W. Carleton & Co. Publishers (London) 1884, 114 pages. / Frederick A. Stokes (New York), 1887, 136 pages. / 1889, 128 pages.
- Cavendish, pseudonym of Henry Jones (1883). Whist Developments. Thos. De La Rue & Co. (London), 172 pages.
- Pole, William (1884). The Philosophy of Whist. Thos. De La Rue & Co. (London), 218 pages.
- Foster, R. F. (1890). Foster's Whist Manual. Mudie and Sons (London), 1st Edition. / Brentano's (New York, Chicago, Washington), 2nd Edition, 1891, 168 pages. Frederick Warne and Co. with Mudie and Sons, (London), 2nd Edition, 1891, 168 pages. Brentano's (New York, Chicago, Washington), 3rd Edition with American Leads, 25th Thousand, 1896, 195 pages. Frederick Warne and Co. with Mudie and Sons, (London), 4th Edition, 1899. Frederick Warne and Co. with Mudie and Sons, (London), 5th Edition, Thirty-fifth Thousand, 1900, 168 pages.
- Coffin, Charles Emmet (1893). The Gist of Whist. J. Selwin Tait & Sons. / Brentano's (New York), 5th Edition, 1895, 109 pages
- Hamilton, C.D.P. (1894). Modern Scientific Whist. Brentano's (New York), 599 pages.
- Pole, William (1895). The Evolution of Whist. Longmans, Green, and Co. (New York, London), 269 pages.
- Doe, John (George Cavendish Benedict) (1900). The Bridge Manual. Mudie and Sons, (London).
- Melrose, C.J. (1901). Bridge Whist. Charles Scribner's Sons, (New York).
- Elwell, Joseph B. (1902). Bridge: Its Principles and Rules of Play (Cover and spine title: Elwell on Bridge). Charles Scribner's Sons (New York). / 1903, 136 pages / 1907, 136 pages / 1911, 136 pages.
- Elwell, Joseph B. (1904). Advanced Bridge: The Higher Principles of the Game Analysed and Explained, and Their Application Illustrated, by Hands Taken from Actual Play (Cover and spine title: Elwell's Advanced Bridge). George Newnes, (London), 277 pages / Charles Scribner's Sons (New York), 277 pages. / 6th Edition, Charles Scribner's Sons (New York), 1907, 297 pages.
- Pole, William (1905). Whist. George Bell & Sons (London, New York), 104 pages.
- Ames, Fisher (1906). The Game of Bridge. Little, Brown and Company (Boston), 190 pages.
- Valet de Pique (1912). Bridge and Auction Bridge. Eveleigh Nash, (London).
- Bergholt, Ernest (c. 1915). Royal Auction Bridge. George Routledge & Sons, (London).

== People and culture ==
The following books provide insights into the people and culture of contract bridge and while they may contain occasional references to certain technical aspects of the game, they are generally not instructional in theme. Fictional novels with a bridge theme are listed separately.

- Culbertson, Ely (1940). The Strange Lives of One Man, An Autobiography. Chicago, Philadelphia, Toronto: The John C. Winston Company. p. 693.
- Ramsey, Guy (1955). Aces All. London: Museum Press Limited. p. 205.
- Olsen, Jack (1960). The Mad World of Bridge. New York: Holt, Rinehart & Winston.
- Olsen, Jack (May 23, 1960), "The Mad World Of Bridge", Sports Illustrated, vol. 12, no. 21, Chicago: Time Inc., p. 41, archived from the original on 2012-11-02
- Mackey, Rex (1964). The Walk of the Oysters: An Unholy History of Contract Bridge. London: W.H.Allen. / Prentice-Hall Inc. (Englewood Cliffs N. J.) 1965, 217 pages.
- Reese, Terence (1967). Story of an Accusation. New York: Simon and Schuster. p. 246.
- Mollo, Victor (1968). The Bridge Immortals. New York: Hart Publishing Company, Inc. p. 256.
- Flint, Jeremy; North, Freddie (1970). Tiger Bridge: The Game at The Top. London: Hodder and Stoughton. p. 184. ISBN 0-340-12854-2. / Simon and Schuster (New York), 191 pages.
- Schenken, Howard (1973). The Education of a Bridge Player. Simon and Schuster. p. 286. / Robert Hale (London), 1976, 221 pages, ISBN 0-7091-5349-X.
- Emery, Sue (1977). No Passing Fancy – Fifty Years of Contract Bridge. Memphis: American Contract Bridge League. p. 128.
- The Bridge Bum by Alan Sontag, 1977
- Reese, Terence (1977). Bridge at the Top. London: Faber and Faber. p. 143. ISBN 0-571-11123-8.
- Daniels, David (1980). The Golden Age of Contract Bridge. New York: Stein and Day. p. 212. ISBN 0-8128-2576-4.
- Clay, John (1985). Culbertson: The Man Who Made Contract Bridge. London: Weidenfeld and Nicolson. ISBN 0-297-78436-6.
- Mahmood, Zia (1991). Bridge My Way. London: Faber. p. 191. ISBN 0-571-16562-1. / Granovetter Books (Ballston Lake, N.Y.), 1992, 252 pages, ISBN 0-940257-12-2 / Netco Press (Little Falls, N.J.), 1994, 252 pages, ISBN 0-9634715-2-X / Netco Press, (Little Falls, N.J.), 2003, 264 pages, ISBN 978-0-9634715-2-9
- Hamman, Bob; Manley, Brent (1994). At the Table: My Life and Times. Memphis, TN: DBM Publications. p. 314. ISBN 0-9642584-0-4.
- Clay, John (1998). Tales from the Bridge Table. London: Hodder & Stoughton. p. 284. ISBN 0-340-58979-5.
- Smith, Marc (1999). World Class: Conversations with the Bridge Masters. Toronto: Master Point Press. p. 288. ISBN 1-894154-15-0.
- Shenkin, Barnet (2000). Playing With the Bridge Legends. Toronto: Master Point Press. p. 240. ISBN 978-1-894154-21-5.
- Truscott, Alan; Truscott, Dorothy (2002). The New York Times Bridge Book: An Acetodal History of the Development, Personalities and Strategies of the World's Most Popular Card Game. New York: St. Martin's Press. pp. 263. ISBN 0-312-29090-X.
- Truscott, Alan (2004). The Great Bridge Scandal. Toronto: Master Point Press. p. 251. ISBN 1-894154-67-3.
- Balfour, Sandy (2005). Vulnerable in Hearts: A Memoir of Fathers, Sons and Contract Bridge. London: Atlantic Books. p. 291. ISBN 1-84354-365-6.
- McPherson, Edward (2007). The Backwash Squeeze & Other Improbable Feats: A Newcomer's Journey into the World of Bridge. New York: Harper Collins Publishers. pp. 340. ISBN 978-0-06-112764-9.
- Hughes, Roy (2007). Canada's Bridge Warriors: Eric Murray and Sami Kehela. Toronto: Master Point Press. p. 336. ISBN 978-1-897106-21-1.
- Wolff, Bobby (2008). The Lone Wolff, An Autobiography of a Bridge Maverick. Toronto: Master Point Press. pp. 287. ISBN 978-1-897106-37-2.

Fictional novels

- Reese, Terence; Flint, Jeremy (1979). Trick 13. London: Weidenfeld and Nicolson. ISBN 0-297-77582-0.
- Christie, Agatha (1984). Cards on the Table. New York: Bantam Doubleday Dell. ISBN 0-553-35025-0.
- Cole, William (1991). Fishheads. Louisville: Devyn Press. ISBN 978-0-910-79190-8.
- Sachar, Louis (2010). The Cardturner. New York: Delacorte Press – Delacorte Books for Young Readers. ISBN 978-0-385-73662-6.
- Powell, Richard (1991). Tickets to the Devil. Louisville, KY: Devyn Press. ISBN 978-0-910-79141-0.

== Encyclopedias, dictionaries and almanacs ==
The following are listed chronologically:

- Russell, Fisher (1933). Dictionary of Contract Bridge: the Webster of Contract. Clinton, MA: Colonial Press Inc. 32 pages.
- Culbertson, Ely, Editor (1935). The Encyclopedia of Bridge. New York: The Bridge World, Inc. 477 pages.
- Reese, Terence; Dormer, Albert (1959). Bridge Player's Dictionary. New York: Sterling Publishing Company. OCLC 3190513. 252 pages.
- Frey, Richard L.; Truscott, Alan F., eds. (1964). The Official Encyclopedia of Bridge (1st ed.). New York: Crown Publishers. LCCN 64023817. 691 pages.
- Frey, Richard L.; Truscott, Alan F.; Cohen, Ben; Barrow, Rhoda, eds. (1967). The Bridge Players' Encyclopedia. London: Paul Hamlyn. OCLC 560654187. 674 pages.
- Frey, Richard L.; Truscott, Alan F.; Smith, Thomas M., eds. (1971). The Official Encyclopedia of Bridge (2nd ed.). New York: Crown Publishers. LCCN 73108084. OCLC 250404789. 793 pages.
- Frey, Richard L.; Truscott, Alan F.; Kearse, Amalya L., eds. (1976). The Official Encyclopedia of Bridge (3rd ed.). New York: Crown Publishers. ISBN 0-517-52724-3. LCCN 76017053. 858 pages.
- Francis, Henry G.; Truscott, Alan F.; Frey, Richard L.; Hayward, Diane, eds. (1984). The Official Encyclopedia of Bridge (4th ed.). New York: Crown Publishers. ISBN 0-517-55272-8. LCCN 84001791. 922 pages.
- Baron, Randall, ed. (1993). The Bridge Player's Dictionary. Louisville, KY: Devyn Press, Inc. ISBN 0-939460-50-5. 277 pages.
- Francis, Henry G.; Truscott, Alan F.; Francis, Dorthy A., eds. (1994). The Official Encyclopedia of Bridge (5th ed.). Memphis, TN: American Contract Bridge League. ISBN 0-943855-48-9. LCCN 96188639. 827 pages (plus 38 page Bibliography)
- Francis, Henry G.; Truscott, Alan F.; Francis, Dorthy A., eds. (2001). The Official Encyclopedia of Bridge (6th ed.). Memphis, TN: American Contract Bridge League. ISBN 0-943855-44-6. OCLC 49606900. 826 pages (plus 60 page Bibliography)
- Hasenson, Peter (2004). British Bridge Almanack. London: 77 Publishing. ISBN 0-9549241-0-X. 490 pages.
- Horton, Mark (1999). The Mammoth Book of Bridge. New York: Carroll & Graf Publishers Inc. ISBN 0-7867-0691-0. 536 pages.
- Levé, Guy (2007). The Encyclopedia of Card Play Techniques at Bridge (First ed.). Toronto, Ontario, Canada: Master Point Press. ISBN 978-1-897106-25-9. 423 pages.
- Manley, Brent; Horton, Mark; Greenberg-Yarbro, Tracey; Rigal, Barry, eds. (2011). The Official Encyclopedia of Bridge (7th ed.). Horn Lake, MS: American Contract Bridge League. ISBN 978-0-939460-99-1. 634 pages (plus two CDs: 1. The Encyclopedia and 2. Biographies and Results).

== Book of the Year Awards ==
=== American Bridge Teachers' Association (ABTA) ===
Each year since 1982, ABTA has recognized one or more books as contributing significantly to the teaching of contract bridge. The following are the award recipients:

- 1982 – Sydnor, Caroline. How To Win More Tricks. Book Three of the Bridge Made Easy Series.
- 1983 – Blackwood, Easley (1983). Complete Book of Opening Leads. Devyn Press.
- 1984 – The Official Encyclopedia of Bridge. Henry G. Francis, Editor-in-Chief; Alan F.Truscott, Executive Editor; Richard L. Frey, Editor Emeritus; Diane Hayward, Fourth Edition Editor (4th ed.). New York: Crown Publishers, Inc. 1984. ISBN 0-517-55272-8, 922 pages.
- 1985 – Lampert, Harry (1985). The Fun Way to Advanced Bridge. Simon & Schuster, Inc. ISBN 0-671-53066-6.
- 1986 – Kantar, Edwin (1986). A New Approach to Play and Defense. HDL Publishing. ISBN 0-937359-01-7.
- 1987 – Commonsense Bidding by William S. Root
- 1988 – Goodwin, Jude; Ellison, Don (1988). Teach me to Play: a First Book of Bridge. Pando Publications.
- 1989 – Baron, Randall; Stewart, Frank. The Devyn Press Bridge Teacher's Manual – Vol I to III; The Bridge Student Text – Vol I to III. Devyn Press.
- 1990 – Root, William (1990). How To Play A Bridge Hand. Crown Publishers, Inc. ISBN 0-517-57457-8.
- 1991 – Basic Book: Klinger, Ron (1991). Guide To Better Card Play. Houghton Mifflin Harcourt Publishing Company. ISBN 9780395591079.
- 1991 – Advanced Book: Lawrence, Mike. – Topics on Bridge Series.
- 1992 – Sands, Norma; Janitschke, Jan. The Bridge Mini-Series.
- 1992 – Advanced Book: To Bid or Not to Bid, The LAW of Total Tricks by Larry Cohen
- 1993 – Basic Book: Sydnor, Caroline. How to Set Your Opponents. Book Four of Bridge Made Easy Series. Sydnor.
- 1993 – Advanced Book: Mahmood, Zia. Bridge My Way.
- 1994 – Root, William (1994). How to Defend a Bridge Hand. Crown Publishers, Inc. ISBN 0-517-59160-X.
- 1995 – Lawrence, Mike. The Complete Book Of Takeout Doubles.
- 1996 – Points Schmoints! Bergen's Winning Bridge Secrets by Marty Bergen
- 1996 – Kantar, Edwin. Kantar Lessons III (Teaching Book).
- 1997 – Advanced Book: Hall-Hall. How The Experts Win At Bridge.
- 1997 – Basic Book: Kantar, Eddie (1997). Bridge for Dummies. IDG Books Worldwide (Foster City, CA) / Second Edition: Wiley Publishing Inc., (Hoboken, NJ), 2006. ISBN 978-0-7645-5015-7.
- 1998 – Beginner/Student Book: McMullin. Easybridge!.
- 1998 – Advanced Book: Granovetters. Forgive Me, Partner.
- 1999 – Basic Book: Kantar, Edwin (1999). Eddie Kantar Teaches Modern Bridge Defense. Master Point Press. ISBN 978-1-894154-02-4.
- 1999 – Advanced Book: Kantar, Edwin (1999). Eddie Kantar Teaches Advanced Bridge Defense. Master Point Press. ISBN 978-1-894154-03-1.
- 1999 – Student Book: 25 Bridge Conventions You Should Know by Barbara Seagram and Marc Smith
- 2000 – Advanced Book: Kantar, Edwin. Kantar Lessons Vol 4.
- 2000 – Beginner/Intermediate Book: Grant, Audrey. Improving your Judgement – Opening The Bidding.
- 2001 – Grant, Audrey (2000). Commonly Used Conventions. American Contract Bridge League (Memphis), 359 pages. ISBN 978-0-943855-14-1.
- 2002 – Bird, David; Smith, Marc. Bridge Technique Series. Master Point Press.
- 2003 – Beginner/Novice Book: Grant, Audrey. Bridge Basics I.
- 2003 – Intermediate/Advanced Book: Thurston, Paul (2002). 25 Steps to Learning 2/1. Master Point Press. ISBN 1-894154-46-0.
- 2004 – Bird, David. Notrump Contracts.
- 2005 – Bergen, Marty. Declarer Play the Bergen Way.
- 2006 – Laderman, Julian (2007). A Bridge to Simple Squeezes (2nd ed.). Toronto: Master Point Press. p. 151. ISBN 978-1-897106-26-6. OCLC 154712413.
- 2007 – Beginner Book: Brown, Gary (2008). Learn to Play Bridge. Master Point Press. ISBN 978-1-897106-39-6.
- 2007 – Intermediate Book: Harrington, Pat. Major Suit Raises I & II.
- 2008 – Intermediate Book: Roth, Danny (2007). How Good is Your Bridge?. Master Point Press. ISBN 978-1-897106-32-7.
- 2008 – Novice Book: Anderson, Joan. Hands on Weak Two-Bids.
- 2009 – Laderman, Julian (2009). A Bridge to Inspired Declarer Play. Master Point Press (Toronto). ISBN 978-1-897106-44-0. / 176p.
- 2010 – Beginner Book: Seagram, Barbara; Bird, David (2009). Planning the Play of a Bridge Hand. Master Point Press (Toronto). ISBN 978-1-897106-51-8. / 231p.
- 2010 – Intermediate Book: Kantar, Eddie (2009). Take All Your Chances (at Bridge). Master Point Press (Toronto). ISBN 978-1-897106-55-6. / 160 pages.
- 2011 – Dufresne, Mary Ann; Ellingsen, Marion. Bridge with Bells and Whistles.
- 2012 – Beginner/Intermediate: O'Connor, Patrick. A First Book Of Bridge Problems.
- 2012 – Intermediate/Advanced: Tucker, Patty; Bernhardt, Melissa (2012). Cuebidding 1 – Controls. Atlanta, GA: Whirlwind Bridge. ISBN 978-0615797076.
- 2013 – Intermediate/Advanced Book: Bird, David; Bourke, Tim (2013). 15 Winning Cardplay Techniques. Poughkeepsie, NY: Vivisphere. ISBN 978-1-58776-183-6.
- 2013 – Beginner Book: Seagram, Barbara; Bird, David (2013). Declarer Play at Bridge: A Quizbook. Toronto: Master Point Press. ISBN 978-1-897106-91-4.
- 2014 – Beginner: O'Connor, Patrick. A Second Book Of Bridge Problems.
- 2014 – Intermediate/Advanced: Grant, Audrey (7 October 2013). Improve Your Declarer Play – Five Steps to Simplify the End Game. American Contract Bridge League. ISBN 978-0-939460-38-0.
- 2015 – Intermediate/Advanced: Bird, David (2014). Winning Duplicate Tactics. Master Point Press. ISBN 978-1-77140-017-6.
- 2015 – Beginner/Intermediate: Larry Teaches Opening Leads. Larry Cohen. 2014.
- 2016 – Beginner/Intermediate: Boehm, Augie. Bridge Smarts.
- 2017 – Beginner/Intermediate: Treble, Bill. Defending at Bridge – A First Course.
- 2017 – Intermediate/Advanced: Rodwell, Eric. Eric Rodwell's Bidding Topics.
- 2018 – Newcomer: Bayone, Jeff. A Taste of Bridge.
- 2018 – Beginner/Novice: Bird, David; Seagram, Barbara. Planning the Play - The Next Level. Master Point Press.
- 2018 – Intermediate/Advanced: Lawrence, Mike. Judgement at Bridge 2. Baron Barclay.
- 2019 – Beginner: Berg, Lynn. Startup Bridge and Beyond.
- 2019 – Intermediate: Bird, David; Cohen, Larry. On the Other Hand: Bridge Cardplay Explained.
- 2019 – Advanced: Lawrence, Mike. Insights on Bridge: Moments in Bridge, Book 1.
- 2020 – Beginner/Novice: Grant, Audrey. Five Tips to Simplify the Defense. Baron Barclay.
- 2020 – Intermediate/Advanced: Bird, David; Cohen, Larry. Defense: On the Other Hand. Master Point Press.
- 2020 – Advanced: Rodwell, Eric. Bidding Topics: Book Two.
- 2021 – Beginner/Novice: Cohen, Larry. Larry Teaches Modern Bidding, Volumes 1, 2 & 3.
- 2021 – Intermediate: Seagram, Barbara. Barbara's Bridge Tips. Master Point Press.
- 2021 – Advanced: Timm, Neil. Two-over-one Game Force: The Final Word. Trafford Publishing.

=== International Bridge Press Association (IBPA) ===
Annually since 2004, the IBPA has chosen one bridge-related title of exceptional merit as follows:

- 2004 – Pottage, Julian (2003). Play or Defend?. Master Point Press. ISBN 978-1-894154-55-0.
- 2005 – Kleinman, Danny; Straguzzi, Nick (2004). The Principle of Restricted Talent. Master Point Press. ISBN 978-1-894154-92-5.
- 2006 – Auken, Sabine (2006). I Love This Game. Master Point Press. ISBN 978-1-897106-06-8.
- 2007 – Hughes, Roy (2007). Canada's Bridge Warriors: Eric Murray and Sami Kehela, 336 pages. Master Point Press. ISBN 978-1-897106-21-1.
- 2008 – Pottage, Julian. A Great Deal of Bridge Problems. Vivisphere Publishing.
- 2009 – Klinger, Ron (11 September 2008). Right through the Pack Again. Weidenfeld & Nicolson/Orion Publishing, 222 pages. ISBN 978-0-297-84476-1.
- 2009 – Vine, Frank (2008). North of the Master Solvers' Club. Master Point Press, Toronto, 183 pages. ISBN 978-1-897106-40-2.
- 2010 – Martens, Krzysztof. Owl, Fox and Spider.
- 2011 – Rodwell, Eric; Horton, Mark (2011). The Rodwell Files. Toronto: Master Point Press. ISBN 978-1-897106-67-9.
- 2012 – Hughes, Roy (2012). The Contested Auction. Toronto: Master Point Press. ISBN 978-1-897106-86-0.
- 2013 – Jacob, Bill (2012). Fantunes Revealed. Toronto: Master Point Press. ISBN 978-1-55494-765-2.
- 2014 – Bourke, Tim; Corfield, Justin (25 February 2014). The Art of Declarer Play. KD Books & Publishing. ISBN 978-1-4942-4725-6., 386 pages
- 2015 – Martens, Krzysztof. Professional Slam Bidding, Parts 1 & 2.
- 2016 – Bird, David. The Abbott, the Parrot and the Bermuda Bowl.
- 2017 – Hans, Sartaj. Bidding the Best.
- 2018 – Woolsey, Kit. The Language of Bridge. Bridge Winners Press.
- 2019 - Juhl, Jeppe (2019). Master of Bridge Psychology: Inside the Remarkable Mind of Peter Fredin. Toronto: Master Point Press. 240 pages.

== American Contract Bridge League (ACBL) surveys ==
The ACBL has conducted the following surveys:

=== 1994 survey ===
The ACBL survey of 1994 was a poll of well-known players and writers only and resulted in the following list of the 20 best books of all time:

- Why You Lose at Bridge by S. J. Simon
- Killing Defence at Bridge by Hugh Kelsey
- Right Through the Pack by Robert Darvas and Norman de V. Hart
- Reese on Play: An Introduction to Good Play by Terence Reese
- Bridge in the Menagerie by Victor Mollo
- To Bid or Not to Bid by Larry N. Cohen
- Adventures in Card Play by Géza Ottlik and Hugh Kelsey
- The Expert Game by Terence Reese
- Defensive Bridge Play Complete by Eddie Kantar
- Play Bridge with Reese by Terence Reese
- How to Read Your Opponents Cards by Mike Lawrence
- Card Play Technique or the Art of Being Lucky by Victor Mollo and Nico Gardener
- Five Weeks to Winning Bridge by Alfred Sheinwold
- Bid Better, Play Better by Dorothy Hayden
- Bridge Squeezes Complete by Clyde E. Love
- Matchpoints by Kit Woolsey
- Bridge With the Blue Team by Pietro Forquet
- The Official Encyclopedia of Bridge by Henry Francis et al.
- All 52 Cards by Marshall Miles
- Watson on the Play of the Hand at Contract Bridge by Louis H. Watson

=== 2007 survey ===
The ACBL survey of 2007 resulted in two lists of favourite books as follows:

Top 10 books as rated by Experts – in descending order

- The Expert Game by Terence Reese
- Why You Lose at Bridge by S. J. Simon
- Adventures in Card Play by Géza Ottlik and Hugh Kelsey
- Killing Defence at Bridge by Hugh Kelsey
- Bridge in the Menagerie by Victor Mollo
- Right Through the Pack by Robert Darvas and Norman de V. Hart
- Watson on the Play of the Hand at Contract Bridge by Louis H. Watson
- Card Play Technique or the Art of Being Lucky by Victor Mollo and Nico Gardener
- Bridge With the Blue Team by Pietro Forquet
- Reese on Play: An Introduction to Good Play by Terence Reese

Top 10 books as rated by Other Readers – in descending order

- Watson on the Play of the Hand at Contract Bridge by Louis H. Watson
- Points Schmoints! Bergen's Winning Bridge Secrets by Marty Bergen
- How to Read Your Opponents Cards by Mike Lawrence
- Why You Lose at Bridge by S. J. Simon
- Killing Defence at Bridge by Hugh Kelsey
- 25 Bridge Conventions You Should Know by Barbara Seagram and Marc Smith
- Card Play Technique or the Art of Being Lucky by Victor Mollo and Nico Gardener
- Adventures in Card Play by Géza Ottlik and Hugh Kelsey
- Standard Bridge Bidding for the 21st Century by Max Hardy
- The Secrets of Winning Bridge by Jeff Rubens

== The Official Encyclopedia of Bridge (7th edition) recommendations ==
The 7th edition of the Encyclopedia recommended the following books with the caveat that the "list on this page is by no means definitive. It was influenced to a degree by surveys published in 1994 and 2007 in the Bridge Bulletin", published by the American Contract Bridge League. Listed alphabetically by first author surname.

- Points Schmoints! Bergen's Winning Bridge Secrets by Marty Bergen
- Declarer Play the Bergen Way by Marty Bergen
- 52 Great Tips on Declarer Play by David Bird
- Another 52 Great Bridge Tips by David Bird
- Matchpoints Versus IMPs by August Boehm
- To Bid or Not to Bid: The Law of Total Tricks by Larry N. Cohen
- Right Through the Pack by Robert Darvas and Norman de V. Hart
- Bridge with the Blue Team by Pietro Forquet
- Commonly Used Conventions in the 21st Century by Audrey Grant
- How the Experts Win at Bridge by Burt and Rose Hall
- Two Over One Game Force (Revised and Expanded) by Max Hardy
- The Mysterious Multi by Mark Horton and Jan van Cleeff
- Canada's Bridge Warriors: Eric Murray and Sami Kehela by Roy Hughes
- Roman Keycard Blackwood: The Final Word by Eddie Kantar
- Take All Your Tricks by Eddie Kantar
- Modern Bridge Defense by Eddie Kantar
- Advanced Bridge Defense by Eddie Kantar
- Test Your Play II by Eddie Kantar
- Topics in Declarer Play by Eddie Kantar
- Killing Defense at Bridge by Hugh Kelsey
- Adventures in Card Play by Hugh Kelsey with Géza Ottlik
- Guide to Better Duplicate Bridge by Ron Klinger
- Modern Losing Trick Count by Ron Klinger
- A Bridge to Simple Squeezes by Julian Laderman
- A Bridge to Inspired Declarer Play by Julian Laderman
- How to Read Your Opponents' Cards by Mike Lawrence
- Judgment at Bridge by Mike Lawrence
- The Complete Book on Balancing by Mike Lawrence
- The Complete Book of Overcalls by Mike Lawrence
- Play Bridge with Mike Lawrence by Mike Lawrence
- Bridge Squeezes Complete by Clyde E. Love
- Winning Endplay Strategy by Clyde Love
- All 52 Cards by Marshall Miles
- Bridge in the Menagerie by Victor Mollo
- Card Play Technique by Victor Mollo and Nico Gardener
- The Devil's Ticket: A Night of Bridge, a Fatal Hand and a New American Age by Gary Pomerantz
- A Great Deal of Bridge Problems by Julian Pottage
- Thinking on Defense by Jim Priebe
- Reese on Play by Terence Reese
- Master Play by Terence Reese
- Play These Hands with Me by Terence Reese
- The Expert Game by Terence Reese
- The Rodwell Files by Eric Rodwell and Mark Horton
- Commonsense Bidding by William Root
- The Secrets of Winning Bridge by Jeff Rubens
- 5 Weeks to Winning Bridge by Alfred Sheinwold
- Why You Lose at Bridge by S. J. Simon
- Frank Stewart's Bridge Club by Frank Stewart
- The Great Bridge Scandal by Alan Truscott
- Watson's Play of the Hand at Bridge by Louis Watson
- The Lone Wolff by Bobby Wolff
- Matchpoints by Kit Woolsey

== Mark Horton's recommendations ==
In his 1999 book, The Mammoth Book of Bridge, Mark Horton lists his recommendations for "Bridge Books You Should Read", grouped as follows:

=== Classics ===
General

- Five Weeks to Winning Bridge by Alfred Sheinwold
- Bid Better, Play Better by Dorothy Hayden
- Matchpoints by Kit Woolsey

Bidding

- Commonsense Bidding by William S. Root
- To Bid or Not to Bid, The Law of Total Tricks by Larry N. Cohen
- Bridge Conventions Complete by Amalya Kearse
- The Complete Book of Hand Evaluation by Mike Lawrence
- The Complete Book of Overcalls by Mike Lawrence

Declarer Play

- Watson on the Play of the Hand at Contract Bridge by Louis H. Watson
- How to Read Your Opponents Cards by Mike Lawrence
- Card Play Technique or the Art of Being Lucky by Victor Mollo and Nico Gardener
- Reese on Play: An Introduction to Good Play by Terence Reese
- The Expert Game by Terence Reese
- Play these Hands with Me by Terence Reese
- Bridge Squeezes Complete by Clyde E. Love
- The Dictionary of Suit Combinations by Jean-Marc Roudinescu
- Adventures in Card Play by Géza Ottlik and Hugh Kelsey

Defender's Play

- Killing Defence at Bridge by Hugh Kelsey
- Opening Leads by Robert Ewen

Entertainment

- Why You Lose at Bridge by S. J. Simon
- Right Through the Pack by Robert Darvas and Norman de V. Hart
- Bridge Humor by Eddie Kantar
- The Best of Eddie Kantar: Funny Stories from the Bridge Table by Eddie Kantar
- Bridge in the Menagerie by Victor Mollo
- Miracles of Card Play by David Bird and Terence Reese
- Bridge with the Blue Team by Pietro Forquet
- The Bridge Bum by Alan Sontag

=== For beginners ===
General

- Bridge for Dummies by Eddie Kantar
- Win at Bridge in 30 Days by David Bird
- Bridge for Bright Beginners by Terence Reese
- Bridge Basics by Ron Klinger
- Teach Me to Play – A First Book of Bridge by Jude Goodwin and Don Ellison
- Bridge for Beginners by Audrey Grant and Zia Mahmood
- Bridge for Beginners by Nico Gardener and Victor Mollo
- Beginning Bridge by Alan Hiron and Maureen Hiron

Bidding

- Teach Yourself Basic Bidding by Alan Truscott and Dorothy Hayden
- Basic Acol by Ben Cohen and Rhoda Barrow
- Really Easy Bidding by the English Bridge Union Teachers' Association (EBUTA)

Declarer Play

- Introduction to Declarer's Play by Eddie Kantar

Defender's Play

- Introduction to Defender's Play by Eddie Kantar

=== For advancing players ===
General

- Winning Contract Bridge Complete by Edgar Kaplan
- The Complete Book of Bridge by Terence Reese and Albert Dormer
- The Mistakes You Make at Bridge by Terence Reese and Roger Trézel

Bidding

- Points Schmoints! Bergen's Winning Bridge Secrets by Marty Bergen
- 25 Bridge Conventions You Should Know by Barbara Seagram and Marc Smith
- Modern Bridge Conventions by Bill Root and Richard Pavlicek
- Judgement in Bridge by Mike Lawrence
- Hand Evaluation in Bridge by Brian Senior
- Preempts from A-Z by Ron Andersen and Sabine Zenkel
- Raising Partner by Brian Senior
- Precision Bidding in Acol by Eric Crowhurst
- Acol in Competition by Eric Crowhurst
- Washington Standard by Steve Robinson

Declarer Play

- Countdown to Winning Bridge by Tim Bourke and Marc Smith
- The Basic Elements of Play and Defence by G. C. H. Fox
- Play of the Hand Complete by Eddie Kantar
- Guide to Better Card Play by Ron Klinger

Defender's Play

- Kantar for the Defense, Volume 1 by Eddie Kantar
- Kantar for the Defense, Volume 2 by Eddie Kantar
- Opening Leads by Mike Lawrence
- Step-by-Step Signalling by Mark Horton
- Eddie Kantar Teaches Advanced Bridge Defense by Eddie Kantar

=== For experienced players ===
General

- The Complete Book of BOLS Tips by Sally Brock
- The Secrets of Winning Bridge by Jeff Rubens
- For Experts Only by Matthew Granovetter
- Matchpoint Bridge by Hugh Kelsey
- Hoffman on Pairs Play by Martin Hoffman
- Expert Tuition for Tournament Players by Raymond Brock and Sally Brock

Bidding

- Partnership Bidding by Andrew Robson and Oliver Segal
- The Modern Losing Trick Count by Ron Klinger
- Better Bridge with Bergen, Volumes 1 & 2 by Marty Bergen
- Precision and Super Precision Bidding by Giorgio Belladonna and Benito Garozzo
- Powerhouse Hands by Albert Dormer
- Aces Scientific by Bobby Goldman

Declarer Play

- Step-by-Step: Deceptive Declarer Play by Barry Rigal
- Advanced Play at Bridge by Hugh Kelsey
- Secrets of Expert Card Play by David Bird and Tony Forrester
- Simple Squeezes by Hugh Kelsey
- Positive Declarer's Play by Terence Reese and Julian Pottage
- Bridge: Tricks of the Trade by Terence Reese and David Bird

Defender's Play

- Dynamic Defense by Mike Lawrence
- Secrets of Expert Defence by David Bird and Tony Forrester
- Step-by-Step: Deception in Defence by Barry Rigal
- Partnership Defense in Bridge by Kit Woolsey
- Positive Defence by Terence Reese and Julian Pottage

== British Bridge Almanack survey ==
The British Bridge Almanack reported on a survey of leading British bridge personalities. The survey presented a chronological list of 16 books by British authors deemed to have made a significant contribution to the development of the game. It asked the personalities to add as many as three titles of their choosing and then to identify their top five. Of the 24 reported respondents, 19 identified one or more titles.

=== Initial list ===
- Lederer Bids Two Clubs by Richard Lederer, 1934
- The Acol System of Contract Bridge by Ben Cohen and Terence Reese, 1938
- Why You Lose at Bridge by S. J. Simon, 1945
- Reese on Play by Terence Reese, 1947
- Card Play Technique by Victor Mollo and Nico Gardener, 1955
- The Theory of Bidding by Norman Squire, 1957
- Winning Points at Match-Point Bridge by Norman Squire and Maurice Harrison-Gray, 1959
- Play Bridge with Reese by Terence Reese, 1960
- The Expert Game by Terence Reese, 1960
- The Acol System Today by Terence Reese and Albert Dormer, 1961
- Develop Your Bidding Judgement by Terence Reese, 1962
- Killing Defence at Bridge by Hugh Kelsey, 1966
- The Play of the Cards by Terence Reese and Albert Dormer, 1967
- Advanced Play at Bridge by Hugh Kelsey, 1968
- Hoffman on Pairs Play by Martin Hoffman, 1982
- Partnership Bidding at Bridge by Andrew Robson and Oliver Segal, 1993

=== Added titles ===
These additional titles were nominated by respondents.

- Bridge is an Easy Game by Iain Macleod, 1952
- Country Life Book of Bridge by Maurice Harrison-Gray, 1972
- Adventures in Card-Play by Géza Ottlik and Hugh Kelsey, 1979
- The Bidding Dictionary by Alan Truscott, 1996
- The Big Game: Rubber Bridge in a London club by Richard Sheehan, 1999

=== Most mentioned ===
These were the leaders by number of selections (as many as five per respondent).

- 17 mentions: The Expert Game by Terence Reese, 1960
- 14 mentions: Why You Lose at Bridge by S. J. Simon, 1945
- 12 mentions: Killing Defence at Bridge by Hugh Kelsey, 1966
- 11 mentions: Reese on Play by Terence Reese, 1947
- 8 mentions: Play Bridge with Reese by Terence Reese, 1960
- 7 mentions: Card Play Technique by Victor Mollo and Nico Gardener, 1955

No other title received more than three mentions.

== Biographies ==
- Hamman, Bob; Brent, Manley (1994). At the Table. Memphis, Tennessee: DBM Publications. ISBN 0-9642584-0-4. LCCN 94-67897. 314 pages.
- Mollo, Victor (1968). The Bridge Immortals. New York City: Hart Publishing Company. 256 pages.
- Ramsey, Guy (1955). Aces All. London: Museum Press Limited. 205 pages.
- Sontag, Alan (1977). The Bridge Bum. New York: William Morrow and Company Inc. ISBN 0-688-03197-8. 240 pages.
- Wolff, Bobby (2008). The Lone Wolff. Toronto: Master Point Press. ISBN 978-1-897106-37-2. 287 pages.

== Bibliographies ==
=== Encyclopedic bibliographies ===
Several encyclopedias on the subject of bridge have provided bibliographies of bridge related publications.

The Encyclopedia of Bridge

The Encyclopedia of Bridge of 1935 acknowledges certain authors' publications in their brief biographies but no summary tabulation or categorization of bridge literature or evaluative commentary is provided.

The Official Encyclopedia of Bridge

The Official Encyclopedia of Bridge (OEB) is a publication of the American Contract Bridge League first published in 1964 with the 7th edition published in 2011. Up to the 6th, each OEB edition contains a bibliography of bridge related publications grouped by subject (history, bidding, play, reference, etc.) and rates selected publications as: (a) having made a significant contribution to the technical development of the game; (b) being mandatory for inclusion in a modern technical library; (c) being optional for inclusion in a modern technical library; or (d) none of the foregoing. Subject categories and ratings for a publication may vary between editions of the OEB. The 1st edition bibliography spans 8 pages and lists about 400 titles; the 6th edition bibliography, prepared by Tim Bourke, spans 60 pages and lists approximately 4,100 titles; Up to the 6th, each edition of The Official Encyclopedia of Bridge contains a bibliography of bridge and bridge related books; the following is a summary of their contents.

OEB Edition	Year	Page Range	Number of Pages	Number of Categories	Number of Entries
1	1964	684-691	8	15	
2	1971	783-793	11	15	
3	1976	849-858	10	15	
4	1984	902-922	21	17	
5	1994	Not numbered	38		
6	2001	Not numbered	60	29	4096
7	2011	Not included	NA	NA	NA

The Bridge Players' Encyclopedia

The Bridge Players Encyclopedia (BPE) was published in 1967 by Paul Hamlyn (London) and is an International Edition based on The Official Encyclopedia of Bridge of 1964 but geared to the needs of British and European players. The edition modified American spellings, "translated" bidding structures to the more widely used Acol system, omitted biographical notes on some lesser known Americans and added biographical notes on some British and European players. Although content differs from the 1964 OEB, the publication contains a 9-page bibliography of approximately 500 titles with subject categorization and rating schemes similar to those of the previous OEB editions.

=== Bibliographies in Wikipedia articles ===
==== By subject ====
- Bridge conventions
- Hand evaluation
- Losing-Trick Count
- Odds, Probabilities
- Opening leads
- Preemptive bidding
- Signalling
- Squeeze plays
- Suit combinations

==== By author ====
- Pierre Albarran
- Tim Bourke
- John Brown
- Michelle Brunner
- Walter Buller
- Ben Cohen
- Larry Cohen
- Ely Culbertson
- Joseph Elwell
- Jeremy Flint
- Robert Frederick Foster
- Charles Goren
- Mark Horton
- Oswald Jacoby
- Eddie Kantar
- Hugh Kelsey
- Ron Klinger
- Harry Lampert
- Michael Lawrence
- Rixi Markus
- Jeff Meckstroth
- Marshall Miles
- Victor Mollo
- Hubert Phillips
- Julian Pottage
- Terence Reese
- Andrew Robson
- Eric Rodwell
- William S. (Bill) Root
- George Rosenkranz
- Barbara Seagram
- S. J. Simon
- Marc Smith
- Paul Stern
- Alan Truscott
- Louis H. Watson
- Kit Woolsey

=== Other bibliographies ===
- Bourke, Tim; Sugden, John (2010). Bridge Books in English from 1886-2010: an annotated bibliography. Cheltenham, England: Bridge Book Buffs. ISBN 978-0-9566576-0-2.

== Bibliography ==
Following are details about books referenced in preceding sections, listed by first named author's surname beginning with:
A B C D E F G H I J K L M N O P Q R S T U V W X Y Z

=== A - ===
- Andersen, Ron; Zenkel, Sabine (1993). Preempts from A-Z. Stamford, Conn.: Magnus Books. ISBN 978-0-9637533-0-4. LCCN 93-079256. 290 pages.

=== B - ===
- Belladonna, Giorgio; Garozzo, Benito. Precision and Super Precision Bidding.
- Bergen, Marty (1995). Points Schmoints! Bergen's Winning Bridge Secrets. Magnus Books (Stamford, CT), 210p. ISBN 0-9637533-2-0.
- Bergen, Marty. Better Bridge with Bergen, Volumes 1 & 2.
- Bird, David. Win at Bridge in 30 Days.
- Bird, David; Forrester, Tony. Secrets of Expert Card Play.
- Bird, David; Forrester, Tony. Secrets of Expert Defence.
- Bird, David; Reese, Terence. Miracles of Card Play.
- Bourke, Tim; Smith, Marc. Countdown to Winning Bridge.
- Brock, Raymond; Brock, Sally. Expert Tuition for Tournament Players.
- Brock, Sally. The Complete Book of BOLS Tips.

=== C - ===
- Chua, Cathy (1998). Fair Play or Foul? Cheating Scandals in Bridge. Melbourne, Australia. ISBN 0-908065-45-0.
- Cohen, Ben; Barrow, Rhoda (1967). The Bridge Players' Encyclopedia. London: Paul Hamlyn. 674 pages.
- Cohen, Ben; Barrow, Rhoda (1993). Basic Acol. CollinsWillow. ISBN 9780002184403.
- Cohen, Larry (1992). To Bid or Not to Bid: The LAW of Total Tricks (9th printing, 1997, revised and expanded ed.). Boca Raton, FL: Natco Press. ISBN 0-9634715-0-3. LCCN 92-80759. 286 pages.
- Cole, William (1991). Fishheads. Louisville: Devyn Press. ISBN 978-0-910-79190-8.
- Crowhurst, Eric (1974). Precision Bidding in Acol. London: Pelham. ISBN 978-0-7207-0765-6. 240 pages. (1983) London: Pelham. ISBN 978-0-7207-1488-3. 256 pages.
- Crowhurst, Eric (1980). Acol in Competition. London: Pelham Books Ltd. ISBN 0-7207-1273-4. 383 pages.
- Crowhurst, Eric; Kambites, Andrew (1992). Understanding Acol. The Good Bidding Guide. Master Bridge Series. London: Victor Gollancz Ltd in association with Peter Crawley. ISBN 0-575-05253-8. 157 pages.

=== D - ===
- Darvas, Robert; Lukacs, Paul (1960). Spotlight on Card Play (1st ed.). London: Nicholas Kaye Limited.
- Darvas, Robert; Hart, Norman de Villiers; Compèred by Stern, Paul (1947). Right Through the Pack: A Bridge Fantasy. London: Contract Bridge Equipment Ltd.
- Dormer, Albert (1975). Powerhouse Hands. Prentice-Hall. ISBN 9780136866671.
- Downey, Ned; Pomer, Ellen (2005). Standard Bidding with SAYC. Toronto: Master Point Press. p. 175. ISBN 978-1-897106-03-7.

=== E - ===
- Landy, Sandra (1998). Really Easy Bidding. English Bridge Union Teachers' Association Committee (EBUTA). Aylesbury, UK: The English Bridge Union. ISBN 0-9506279-2-5.
- Ewen, Robert (1970). Opening Leads. Englewood Cliffs, N.J.: Prentice-Hall, Inc. ISBN 0-13-637371-2. 226 pages.
- Ewen, Robert (1975). Pre-emptive Bidding. Englewood Cliffs, N.J.: Prentice-Hall, Inc. ISBN 0-13-695296-8. 162 pages. Also: (1976) London: Robert Hale Books. ISBN 0-7091-5601-4. 162 pages.

=== F - ===
- Feldheim, Harold (1971). The Weak Two Bid in Bridge. Port Chester, NY: Barclay Bridge Supplies. Revised 1973, further revised 1991.
- Flannery, Bill (1984). The Flannery 2 Diamonds Opening. Louisville, KY: Devyn Press. ISBN 0-910791-13-9.
- Forquet, Pietro (1983). Bridge With the Blue Team. A.B. Publications. ISBN 0-575-06391-2.
- Fox, G. C. H. The Basic Elements of Play and Defence.

=== G - ===
- Gardener, Nico; Mollo, Victor. Bridge for Beginners.
- Goldman, Bobby. Aces Scientific.
- Goodwin, Jude; Ellison, Don. Teach Me to Play – A First Book of Bridge.
- Goren, Charles; Olsen, Jack (1965). Bridge Is My Game: Lessons of a Lifetime. Doubleday & Company Inc. (Garden City, New York). / 190 pages.
- Granovetter, Matthew. For Experts Only.
- Grant, Audrey; Rodwell, Eric (2009). 2/1 Game Force. Louisville, KY: Baron Barclay Bridge Supply. ISBN 978-0-939460-84-7.

=== H - ===
- Hamman, Bob; Brent, Manley (1994). At the Table. Memphis, Tennessee: DBM Publications. ISBN 0-9642584-0-4. LCCN 94-67897.
- Hardy, Max (1989). Two Over One Game Force (Revised and Expanded ed.). Kentucky: Devyn Press. ISBN 978-0-910791-35-9. OCLC 29781186.
- Hardy, Max (2000). Standard Bridge Bidding for the 21st Century. SQueeZe Books. ISBN 978-1-58776-049-5. LCCN 00-104457.
- Hardy, Max (2002). Advanced Bridge Bidding for the 21st Century. SQueeZe Books. ISBN 978-1-58776-125-6. LCCN 2002104136.
- Hayden, Dorothy. Bid Better, Play Better. (1966-1986). First edition 1966: Harper & Row (New York), 196p. / 1966: Award Books (New York), 254p. / 1967: Universal (New York), 254p. / 1967: Award Books (New York), Tandem (London), 254p. / 1970: Award Books (New York), Tandem (London), 254p. / 1981: Pinnacle Books (New York), 235p. / 1986: Perennial Library (New York), 235p. ISBN 0-06-091351-7
- Hiron, Alan; Hiron, Maureen (1989). Beginning Bridge. Crowood Press. ISBN 9781852233518.
- Hoffman, Martin (1982). Hoffman on Pairs Play. Faber and Faber (London), 184p. ISBN 0-571-11750-3.
- Horton, Mark (1994). Step-by-Step Signalling.

=== J - ===
- Jabbour, Zeke (2004). Lawless Territory. American Contract Bridge League, Bridge Bulletin, August 2004, pp. 27–28.
- Jannersten, Eric (1972). Card Reading - the art of guesssing right at the bridge table. New York: Hart Publishing Company Inc. LCCN 72-78414.

=== K - ===
- Kantar, Eddie (Edwin): For a complete listing of Eddie Kantar books, see Edwin Kantar bibliography.
- Play of the Hand Complete. Eddie Kantar. 1965. 108 pages.
- Kantar, Eddie (1968). Introduction to Declarer's Play. Wilshire Book Company (North Hollywood, CA), 142p., ISBN 978-0-87980-401-5 / Prentice Hall (Endlewood Cliffs, NJ), 147p. / Muller (London), 1971, ISBN 978-0-584-10393-9, 147p
- Kantar, Eddie (1968). Introduction to Defender's Play. Englewood Cliffs, N.J., Prentice-Hall. Wilshire Book Company (North Hollywood, CA), 153p. / Prentice Hall (Endlewood Cliffs, NJ), 153p. / Muller (London), 1971, ISBN 978-0-584-10394-6, 153p / Wilshire Book Company (North Hollywood, CA), 1977, ISBN 978-0-87980-322-3, 153p
- Kantar, Eddie (1974). Defensive Bridge Play Complete. Wilshire Book Company (North Hollywood, CA), 528p. / 1975, 1976. ISBN 978-0-87980-287-5.
- Kantar, Eddie (1977). Bridge Humor. Melvin Powers Self-improvement Library. North Hollywood, CA: Wilshire Book Company. ISBN 978-0-87980-342-1. 151 pages.
- Kantar, Eddie (1983). Kantar for the Defense, Volume 1. Melvin Powers Self-improvement Library. North Hollywood, CA: Wilshire Book Co. ISBN 978-0-87980-400-8. 200 pages.
- Kantar, Eddie (1984). Kantar for the Defense, Volume 2. Melvin Powers Self-improvement Library. North Hollywood, CA: Wilshire Book Co. ISBN 978-0-87980-409-1. 200 pages.
- Kantar, Eddie (1989). The Best of Eddie Kantar: Funny Stories from the Bridge Table. Granovetter Books. ISBN 978-0-940257-03-0. 214 pages.
- Kantar, Eddie (1997–2008). Bridge for Dummies. Wiley. ISBN 9780764550157. IDG Books Worldwide (Foster City, CA), 1997, ISBN 978-0-7645-5015-7, 382p. / Second Edition: Wiley Publishing Inc., (Hoboken, NJ), 2006, ISBN 978-0-471-92426-5, 388p. / Large Print Edition: Thorndike Press (Waterville, Me), 2008, ISBN 978-1-4104-0503-6, 563p
- Kantar, Eddie (1999). Eddie Kantar Teaches Advanced Bridge Defense. Toronto: Master Point Press. ISBN 978-1-894154-03-1. 240 pages.
- Kaplan, Edgar (1964). Winning Contract Bridge Complete. Fleet Publishing Corp.
- Kearse, Amalya (1990). Bridge Conventions Complete (Revised and Expanded ed.). Louisville, KY: Devyn Press Inc. ISBN 0-910791-76-7. 1121 pages.
- Kelsey, Hugh (1966). Killing Defence at Bridge. London: Faber and Faber. 191 pages.
- Kelsey, Hugh (1968). Advanced Play at Bridge. London: Faber and Faber. 192 pages.
- Kelsey, Hugh (1985). Simple Squeezes. Victor Gollancz Ltd. ISBN 0-575-03607-9. 120 pages.
- Kelsey, Hugh. Matchpoint Bridge.
- Kleinman, Danny (2004). The No Trump Zone. Toronto: Master Point Press. ISBN 1-894154-70-3. 217 pages.
- Bridge Scandal in Houston (4th ed.). Danny Kleinman. 2005. 146 pages.
- Klinger, Ron (2001). Guide to Better Card Play. Master Bridge Series (New ed.). London: Cassell in association with Peter Crawley. ISBN 0-304-35769-3.
- Klinger, Ron. Bridge Basics.
- Klinger, Ron; collab Pat Husband & Andrew Kambites (1994). Basic Bridge. London: Victor Gollancz. ISBN 0-575-05690-8.
- Klinger, Ron (1986). Bidding to Win at Contract Bridge, Book One: The Modern Losing Trick Count. Sydney, Australia: Modern Bridge Publications. pp. 122. ISBN 0-9592305-2-1. — (2009) The Modern Losing Trick Count: Bidding to Win at Contract Bridge (13th impression). London: by Cassell in association with Peter Crawley, pp. 143. ISBN 978-0-304-35770-3.
- Koelman, Johannes M.V.A. A New Losing-Trick Count. The Bridge World, May 2003, Vol 74, Issue 8, p. 26.

=== L - ===
- Lawrence, Mike (1973). How to Read Your Opponents Cards. First Edition: Prentice-Hall, Inc., (Englwood Cliffs, NJ), 175p. / Second Edition: Devyn Press Inc., (Louisville, KY), 1986, 175p. ISBN 0-910791-48-1.
- Lawrence, Mike (1976). Judgement in Bridge. Max Hardy, 6th Printing, 1987, 151p. ISBN 0-939460-02-5.
- Lawrence, Mike (1980). The Complete Book of Overcalls. 202p. Max Hardy (Hawthorne, CA).
- Lawrence, Mike (1983). The Complete Book on Hand Evaluation in Contract Bridge. Hawthorne, CA: Max Hardy. p. 194. ISBN 0-939460-27-0.
- Lawrence, Mike (1988). How to Play Card Combinations. Louisville, KY: Devyn Press, Inc. ISBN 978-0-910791-63-2.
- Lawrence, Mike (1996). Mike Lawrence's Opening Leads, 289 pages. C&T Bridge Supplies.
- Lawrence, Mike (1982). Dynamic Defense. Devyn Press, 226 pages. ISBN 9780910791014.
- Lawrence, Mike; Wirgren, Anders (2004). I Fought the Law of Total Tricks.
- Lederer, Richard (1934). Lederer Bids Two Clubs. William & Norgate. ASIN B0008D0LTO.
- Levé, Guy (2007). The Encyclopedia of Card Play Techniques at Bridge. Toronto: Master Point Press. ISBN 978-1-897106-25-9. 423 pages.
- Love, Clyde E. (1959). Bridge Squeezes Complete or Winning End Play Strategy (1st ed.). Long Island City, NY: Barclay Bridge Supplies, Sterling Publishing Company Inc. LCCN 59014249.

=== M - ===
- Mahmood, Zia; Grant, Audrey. Bridge for Beginners.
- Marston, Paul; Hughes, Nick (1992). Opening Two Bids. Sydney, Australia: Grand Slam Books. ISBN 1-875282-01-7. 59 pages.
- Mendelson, Paul (1998). Mendelson's Guide to the Bidding Battle. Cambridge, UK: Colt Books. ISBN 0-905899-86-5.
- Mollo, Victor (1947). Streamlined Bridge or Bidding without Tears. Illustrated by Anton (1st ed.). London: David Marlowe Ltd.
- Mollo, Victor (1965). Bridge in the Menagerie. London: Faber and Faber.
- Mollo, Victor (1968). The Bridge Immortals. New York City: Hart Publishing Company.
- Mollo, Victor (1983). You Need Never Lose at Bridge: Happy Days in the Menagerie (1st ed.). London: Methuen. ISBN 0-413-52500-7.
- Mollo, Victor; Gardener, Nico (1955). Card Play Technique or the Art of Being Lucky (1st ed.). London: George Newnes Limited. OCLC 21982767. 381 pages.
- Morehead, Albert; Frey, Richard L. (1974). Morehead on Bidding (2nd ed.). New York: Simon & Schuster. LCCN 73-21053. SBN 671-21699-6.
- Mould, Alan (1997). Step by Step Pre-empts. London: B.T. Batsford Ltd. ISBN 0-7134-8163-3. 143 pages.

=== O - ===
- Ottlik, Géza; Kelsey, Hugh (1979). Adventures in Card Play. London: Victor Gallancz Ltd. in association with Peter Crawley. Also, Adventures in Card Play. (2005) London: Cassell in association with Peter Crawley, 7th Impression. 14 July 2005. ISBN 0-304-36807-5.

=== R - ===
- Reese, Terence: For a complete listing of Terence Reese books, see Terence Reese bibliography.
- Reese, Terence (1964). Bridge for Bright Beginners. Sterling Publishing Co. (New York). 151 pages. / Dover Publications (New York), 151 pages. / Oak Tree Press (London), 151 pages. / Oak Tree Press (London), 1965, 151 pages. / Cornerstone Library (New York), 1968 and 1969, 144 pages. / Dover Publications (New York), 1973, ISBN 978-0-486-22942-3, 151 pages.
- Reese, Terence; Bird, David (1989). Bridge: Tricks of the Trade. Master Bridge Series. Victor Gollancz (London) in association with Peter Crawley. ISBN 978-0-575-04504-0. 144 pages. / 1991, ISBN 978-0-575-05024-2, 144 pages.
- Reese, Terence; Dormer, Albert (1974). The Complete Book of Bridge. Saturday Review Press / E.P. Dutton & Co., Inc. ISBN 0-8415-0277-3. 485 pages. (1985), Faber, ISBN 978-0-571-13528-8, 469 pages.
- Reese, Terence; Pottage, Julian (1986). Positive Declarer's Play. Master Bridge Series. Victor Gollancz (London) in association with Peter Crawley. ISBN 978-0-575-03839-4. ISBN 978-0-575-03838-7, 128 pages.
- Reese, Terence; Pottage, Julian (1985). Positive Defence. Master Bridge Series. Victor Gollancz (London) in association with Peter Crawley. ISBN 978-0-575-03562-1. ISBN 978-0-575-03612-3, 128 pages. / Master Point Press (Toronto) 2005, ISBN 978-1-894154-93-2, 160 pages.
- Reese, Terence; Trézel, Roger (1984). The Mistakes You Make at Bridge. Master Bridge Series. Gollancz (London) in association with Peter Crawley. ISBN 978-0-575-03424-2. 1989, ISBN 978-0-575-03409-9, 168 pages. / Reprint: Houghton Mifflin (Boston) in association with Peter Crawley, 1992, ISBN 978-0-395-62891-1 / New Edition: Gollancz (London), 1994, ISBN 978-0-575-05785-2, 168 pages. / Revised Edition by Ron Klinger: Cassell (London) in association with Peter Crawley, 2006, ISBN 978-0-304-36811-2, 160 pages.
- Rigal, Barry. Step-by-Step: Deceptive Declarer Play.
- Rigal, Barry. Step-by-Step: Deception in Defence.
- Robinson, Steve (1996). Washington Standard. Devyn Press (Louisville, KY). ISBN 978-0-939460-59-5. 300 pages.
- Robson, Andrew; Segal, Oliver. Partnership Bidding.
- Root, Bill; Pavlicek, Richard (1981). Modern Bridge Conventions. Crown Publishers Inc. ISBN 978-0-517-54573-7. 244 pages; Three Rivers Press (New York), ISBN 978-0-517-88429-4, 244 pages; 1992, Crown Publishers Inc., Crown Trade Paperbacks (New York), ISBN 978-0-517-58727-0, 244 pages.
- Root, Bill (1986). Commonsense Bidding. Crown Publishers Inc. (New York). ISBN 9780517561300. ISBN 0-517-56130-1 (hardcover), ISBN 0-517-56129-8 (softcover), 216 pages; 1995, Three Rivers Press (New York), ISBN 0-517-88430-5, 216 pages.
- Root, Bill (1998). The ABCs of Bridge. New York: Crown Publishers Inc. ISBN 0-609-80162-7.
- Roudinescu, Jean-Marc. The Dictionary of Suit Combinations.
- Rubens, Jeff (1971). The Secrets of Winning Bridge (2nd ed.). New York: Grosset & Dunlap. ISBN 0-448-01746-6 (hardcover), ISBN 0-448-02094-7 (softcover)

=== S - ===
- Seagram, Barbara; Smith, Marc (1999). 25 Bridge Conventions You Should Know. Master Point Press, Toronto, 190 pages. ISBN 1-894154-07-X., ISBN 978-1-894154-07-9
- Seagram, Barbara; Bird, David (2003). 25 More Bridge Conventions You Should Know. Master Point Press, Toronto, 210 pages. ISBN 1-894154-65-7.
- Senior, Brian (1994). Raising Partner. London: Faber & Faber. ISBN 978-0-571-16901-6. 140 pages; London: Batsford. ISBN 978-0-7134-7918-8. 127 pages.
- Senior, Brian (1998). Hand Evaluation in Bridge. London: B.T. Batsford. p. 141. ISBN 978-0-7134-8294-2.
- Senior, Brian (2015). Simply the Best - 20 of the Greatest Bridge Players of all Time. Self-published.
- Sheinwold, Alfred (1987). 5 Weeks to Winning Bridge. Pocket Books. ISBN 9780671687700. (1960-1987). First copyright 1959. / First printing 1960: Pocket Books (New York), Permabook M7514, 548 pages. / 1960: Pocket Books (New York), 548 pages, ISBN 0-671-78141-3 / 1960: Pocket Books (New York), Permabook M5015 / 1962: Trident Press, Simon & Schuster (New York), 528 pages. / 1964: Pocket Books (New York), 549 pages. / 1964: Revised and enlarged, Trident Press, Simon & Schuster (New York), 548 pages. / 1973: Pocket Books (New York), 547 pages. / 1975: Pocket Books (New York), 547 pages. / 1987: Pocket Books (New York). 548 pages, ISBN 0-671-42287-1
- Simon, S. J. (1945). Why You Lose at Bridge. Nicholson & Watson.
- Sontag, Alan (1977). The Bridge Bum. William Morrow and Company, Inc, (New York), 240p. ISBN 0-688-03197-8.
- Inside the Bermuda Bowl. Mission Viejo, CA: John Swanson. 1998.

=== T - ===
- Truscott, Alan; Hayden, Dorothy (1976). Teach Yourself Basic Bidding. Arco Publishing Company. ISBN 9780668038362.

=== W - ===
- Watson, Louis H (1934). Watson on the Play of the Hand at Contract Bridge. New York: Lewis Copeland Company. p. 492. — (1958) Enlarged and modernized by Sam Fry, Jr.
- Wei, C.C.; Andersen, Ron (1992). Profits from Preempts. Louisville, KY: Devyn Press Inc. ISBN 0-910791-37-6. 162 pages.
- Wolff, Bobby (2008). The Lone Wolff. Toronto: Master Point Press. ISBN 978-1-897106-37-2. 287 pages.
- Woolsey, Kit (1982). Matchpoints. Shelbyville, KY: Devyn Press Inc. p. 343. ISBN 978-0-910791-00-7. OCLC 13491401. — (reprinted 1988 and 1992) Louisville, KY: Devyn Press Inc., pp. 343, OCLC 477153995.
- Woolsey, Kit (1980). Partnership Defense in Bridge. Shelbyville, KY: Devyn Press Inc. p. 303. OCLC 7498214. — (reprinted 1991), pp. 303, ISBN 978-0-910791-68-7.
- Woolsey, Kit (1981). Modern Defensive Signalling in Contract Bridge. Port Chester, NY: Barclay Bridge Supplies Inc. p. 64. — (reprinted 1992) Louisville, KY: Devyn Press Inc., pp. 64, ISBN 0-910791-40-6.

== See also ==
=== Lists ===
- List of bridge competitions and awards
- List of contract bridge magazines
- List of contract bridge people

=== Books ===
- 25 Bridge Conventions You Should Know
- Bridge Squeezes Complete
- The Cardturner
- Contract Bridge for Beginners
- Planning the Play of a Bridge Hand
- The Official Encyclopedia of Bridge
