= Bridge Magazine =

British monthly magazine

- Frequency: Monthly
- Founder: A. E. Manning Foster
- Founded: 1926
- Final issue: February 2020
- Country: United Kingdom
- Based in: Wheatley, Oxfordshire
- Language: English
- ISSN: 1351-4261

Bridge Magazine was a British monthly magazine devoted to the game of contract bridge. It was the oldest such magazine having been established in 1926 by A. E. Manning Foster.

It was not published during World War II, so it had fewer issues than The Bridge World. The Bridge Plus, a monthly magazine that was published between 1999 and 2008, was incorporated into Bridge Magazine. The magazine changed its title to Bridge International in 1984, to Bridge in 1990 and back to Bridge Magazine in 1992.

In the June 2013 issue Mark Horton, the editor, announced that in future the magazine would only be published online because the paper version had been losing too much money.

In the December 2017 issue Horton said that the current issue might be the last. It had been planned to relaunch the title in January 2018 as a free magazine, but the owners had said that they still required convincing that there would be enough subscribers and that a satisfactory business model was in place. In January 2018 it relaunched as a free magazine under the title A New Bridge Magazine, with Horton remaining as the editor. It ceased publication after the February, 2020 issue. A New Bridge Magazine became part of the Funbridge group which launched BeBRIDGE with Mark Horton as Editor.

== See also ==
- Bridge d'Italia
- List of bridge books
- List of bridge magazines
