= Right Through the Pack =

1947 book

- Author: Robert Darvas & Norman de V. Hart
- Subject: Contract bridge
- Published: 1947
- Publisher: Contract Bridge Equipment Ltd.
- Publication place: United Kingdom
- Pages: 220

Right Through the Pack: A Bridge Fantasy is a 1947 book about the game of contract bridge by Robert Darvas and Norman de Villiers Hart. It includes 52 deals in which each of the 52 cards of the pack plays a significant role, described by and interspersed with comments from the playing cards themselves, the anthropomorphic "People of the Pack".

== Background ==
Darvas (1906-1957) was the best-known Hungarian bridge journalist of his day. Hart (1888 – after 1947) was an English bridge player and writer. Austrian bridge player and theorist Paul Stern had (being a Jew and also strongly anti-Nazi) sought refuge in London after Nazi Germany occupied Austria in the 1938 Anschluss. According to the Introduction to the book by English bridge writer Guy Ramsay, Stern had known Darvas in the 1930s and in his exile had become friends with Hart. Stern proposed a book by the two of them, combining the Hungarian's fantasy and wit and the Englishman's fancy and humour. Soviet Russia, which had taken control of Hungary after World War II, considered bridge a decadent game. By devious routes Darvas smuggled out his ideas for bridge deals to Stern, who passed them on to Hart, who wrote the narrative. There were still difficulties to overcome; they were solved by English bridge player and writer Ben Cohen, who gave the book its title and even managed to arrange for Darvas to come to England to see it through to publication.

== Summary ==
The narrator has been involved in bridge all day – writing an article, playing rubber bridge, and taking part in a practice match. In the early hours of the morning, alone in a club cardroom puzzling over a deal from that day, the 52 cards speak with him and with each other, and each one tells him a story of a deal in which they had played a significant part. The narrator proposes to write a book about the tales of the People of the Pack; they are delighted by the idea. In the daylight, a club steward enters the cardroom and opens the window blinds. The steward asks the narrator if he has been asleep. "No, I have not been asleep." he replies.

All 52 deals contain points of technical interest, from the whimsical through the practical to the highly advanced. (For example, the penultimate deal involves the extremely rare hexagon squeeze, and the final deal describes a novel coup named the Robert coup after its discoverer, Robert Darvas.) Every card in Hart's narrative has their own distinct personality, and each suit has its own personality traits.

The book includes a handful of cartoons which depict some of the cards. They are uncredited, but resemble in style some of those by Fougasse, co-author and illustrator of the 1934 humorous book about bridge Aces Made Easy.

The title page acknowledges Stern's contribution as "Compèred by Dr. Paul Stern"; he also provided the Foreword.

== The Robert coup ==
The 52nd and last deal in the book is "The Tale of the Four of Diamonds". It describes a coup, attributed to and named in honour of Robert Darvas, which involves (1) a ruff-and-discard, ruffed by the longer trump hand (or by both declarer and dummy) to shorten the trump holding and so preserve an exit card, and (2) forcing the other defender to ruff with a high trump to prevent a lower trump taking a trick en passant, and so endplaying him in the trump suit. The deal was:

		♠♤	953		
		♥	K		
		♦	9532		
		♣♧	A6543		
♠♤	876	**N** **W E** **S**		♠♤	KJ10
♥	Q3	**N** **W E** **S**		♥	J109876542
♦	AJ108	**N** **W E** **S**		♦	-
♣♧	10987	**N** **W E** **S**		♣♧	K
Lead: **♥Q**		♠♤	AQ42		
Lead: **♥Q**		♥	A		
Lead: **♥Q**		♦	KQ764		
Lead: **♥Q**		♣♧	QJ2		

The bidding went:

South	West	North	East
1♦	Pass	2♦	3♥
4♦	Dbl	All pass	

The play began (with winning cards boldfaced):
Trick 1: ♥Q ♥K ♥2 **♥A**
Trick 2: ♦K **♦A** ♦2 ♥4
Trick 3: ♣10 **♣A** (declarer has no chance unless E has singleton K) ♣K ♣2
Tricks 4-7: ♠3 to **♠Q** (a finesse), then **♠A, ♣Q, ♣J**
Trick 8: ♠2 ♠8 ♠9 **♠K**

The position is now, with East to lead:

		♠♤	-		
		♥	-		
		♦	953		
		♣♧	65		
♠♤	-	**N** **W E** **S**		♠♤	-
♥	3	**N** **W E** **S**		♥	J10987
♦	J108	**N** **W E** **S**		♦	-
♣♧	9	**N** **W E** **S**		♣♧	-
		♠♤	4		
		♥	-		
		♦	Q764		
		♣♧	-		

Declarer ruffs the forced ♥ return with ♦4 (shortening his trumps to the same number as West) and overruffs in dummy with ♦5. A small ♣ is led from dummy and ruffed. North and South now each hold two trumps while West holds three; this is the key to the position. South leads ♠4. West must ruff high or declarer will make his tenth trick at once; but after doing so, is endplayed at trick 12 into leading into the split tenace in trumps (93 facing Q7).

The Bridge Players' Encyclopedia gives a different example deal.

== Recognition ==
Bridge Players' Encyclopedia has called the book one of those which made "a major improvement to the technical development of the game". In a 1994 ACBL poll, it was voted "One of the Top Three Bridge Books of All Time". Bridge player Randy Baron has said, "Without any doubt, the best bridge book ever written". Bridge player and writer Jeff Rubens has said, "This is my favorite bridge book, perhaps my favorite book, period. It has entertained me on every reading, and there have been many. What more can I say?" Bridge player and writer Ron Klinger has said, "It is on virtually every magazine's and player's list of the top ten bridge books of all time and has become a bridge classic". Tim Bourke and John Sugden's Annotated Bibliography of Bridge Books in English calls it "One of the most remarkable and best-loved Bridge books of all time."

== See also ==
- List of bridge books

== Subsequent editions ==
The following editions have also been published:

- in 1947 by Stuyvesant House, New York, in paperback, with an added Introduction by Ely Culbertson and more elaborate artwork by Stanley Meltzoff replacing that in the original. Stern's credit appears as "assisted by Dr. Paul Stern". Named as a First Edition.
- in 1957 by George Allen & Unwin Ltd, London, in hardback, with an Introduction by Guy Ramsey replacing the original Foreword by Stern. Credit attribution to Stern is in Ramsey's Introduction. This so-named Second Edition retains the original artwork.
- in 2006 by Devyn Press, Louisville KY, in paperback, with the Introduction by Ely Culbertson, the original Foreword by Stern and the artwork by Stanley Meltzoff.
