= The Cardturner =

Book by Louis Sachar

- First edition cover
- Author: Louis Sachar
- Language: English
- Genre: fiction
- Publisher: Delacorte Press
- Publication date: May 11, 2010
- Publication place: United States
- Media type: hardcover, e-book, paperback
- Pages: 336
- ISBN: 978-0-385-73662-6

The Cardturner is a novel written by Newbery Medal winner Louis Sachar and published by Delacorte Press in May 2010.

== Plot summary ==
Seventeen-year-old Alton Richards is nearing the end of the academic year. His best friend, Cliff, recently started dating Alton's ex-girlfriend, Katie. Throughout his life, Alton's mother has tried to get Alton into her Uncle Lester's good books, as he is very rich.

Uncle Lester, known informally as Trapp, becomes ill, resulting in the loss of his sight. As a result, he requires a cardturner - someone to read aloud his cards to him - when he plays duplicate bridge. When Alton returns from his penultimate day at school, his mother agrees to allow him to be the cardturner for Trapp over the summer. His previous cardturner was Toni Castaneda, a schizophrenic, homeschooled girl who was disallowed to be Trapp's cardturner when she questioned his card choice one game.

Alton takes Uncle Lester to his bridge club, where he plays with a woman of a similar age named Gloria as his partner. Despite some stumbles from Alton, Trapp and Gloria win with a sixty five percent game. Trapp explains to Alton that memory of the cards is not what helps him to succeed, more how he remembers them.

Alton becomes entangled in the world of bridge, first learning how to play the game and then picking up on common moves. His younger sister, Leslie, also takes interest in the game. Cliff remains unimpressed. He notes how unusual the game is - when Trapp plays with Wallace, his other partner with whom he plays once a week, they break a very rare seventy percent game, though argue profusely afterwards. In this time, Alton notes that his uncle is very good at the game, and is almost a Grand Life Master, but he has not won a national tournament, which Gloria advises Alton not to mention. Alton attempts to befriend Trapp, learning that he once had a bridge partner named Annabel King who was the sister of his wife. Alton's parents, however, push him to talking about Trapp's will, as they are in need of money after Alton's father lost his job.

One day, Trapp plays against Toni Castaneda, whom he initially dislikes, as Trapp treats her as his protégée. She makes numerous mistakes when they play, causing him to finish in a rare sixth place. Later on, when Alton tries to return from Trapp's bridge game, his car engine fails. Trapp decides to buy him a new car. Trapp plays again with Toni, doing even worse than before, with even Alton picking up on how poorly she plays. Later on, however, she calls him to ask to play a game of bridge, realising he understands the game and is just choosing not to tell his uncle.

Toni plays a game of bridge with Alton, Leslie and Cliff, who despite not taking the game seriously, instantly attempts to befriend Toni. He takes her to a party Alton is unable to attend to as he has to take Trapp to a sectional tournament. Alton develops a romantic interest towards Toni, and begins to grow suspicious of her relationship with Cliff. Trapp and Gloria later win the sectional tournament, and Toni calls Alton the next day to ask how it went.

Toni organizes to play with Alton at the club later on, winning a grand slam on their first board. Despite this, they perform poorly against most of their contestants, until they get to one table. They okay against two men, both of whom constantly mock and criticise both Toni and Alton. However, Toni redoubles on their last hand, causing her and Alton to win that hand. Toni later explains that because of her schizophrenia, her grandmother, Annabel King, had told her to redouble. Despite this, they both finish last.

Alton takes Trapp to the regional tournament, where he learns what happened to Annabel - many years ago, Annabel King had been the wife of wealthy senator Henry King. Her talent in bridge made his lack, thereof, more noticeable. However, Henry began forbidding Annabel to play bridge, going as far as to domestically abuse her. Annabel later became partners with Trapp, both usually being successful. Trapp remarks how despite the risky play in the card, Annabel never refused to redouble. However, when Trapp and Annabel entered a national tournament, Annabel was taken away under the advice of Henry. She was later locked up in an asylum, where she died from drinking bleach. Trapp and Annabel's sister, Nina, attempted to see her and filed several lawsuits, though this faltered.

Trapp begins performing well at the regionals, but is almost fifteen minutes late one day, and berates Alton for reading the cards too quickly. Later on, he makes a mistake by asking to play the Queen of Clubs, a card he does not have. Despite this not having any negative consequences, Trapp refuses to play for the rest of the day, telling Alton - who he finds out has been learning the game - he can take his place. Despite praise from Gloria, Trapp demands to be taken home immediately, cancelling all his bridge games until the national tournament. He later passes away, leaving Alton's family with money for college and paying off debts.

At the service, Alton asks Toni for another game of bridge at the club, where they play substantially better than the first time. However, as they are playing, Alton begins to hear Trapp tell him which cards to play, and Toni is frustrated afterwards as she only played the cards Annabel told her to. Alton is told driving directions by Trapp, and when Toni questions him where he's going, he admits to bearing Trapp's voice. They are directed to his house, where they find the documents for the upcoming tournament. Both agree to play in the national tournament on behalf of Trapp and Annabel.

Despite Toni's relationship with Cliff, she begins to show romantic interest in Alton. They play at the national tournament with Annabel and Trapp having control over their moves. They perform well, with both Toni and Alton enjoying the experience with each other. They eventually win the tournament, where Toni kisses Alton out of excitement. Alton concludes the book by saying that he continues to play bridge, and his relationship with Toni is "unauthorized information".

== Characters ==
Alton Richards: The protagonist of the novel. He is 17 years old and has no job and no money. He often uses 'not so clever phrases'. At the start of the novel, Alton knows nothing about bridge but he eventually learns how to play and becomes an avid bridge player.

Lester Trapp: Alton's Uncle. He has a passion for bridge and is blind, diabetic and rich. He is a smart man who has a mysterious past with the dead card player, Annabel King.

Toni Castaneda: Previously Lester Trapp's cardturner before he got rid of her. She is described as pretty but shy. When Alton first meets her, when he is 6, he says that she is crazy. She becomes Alton's love interest later on. Toni appears to be able to hear voices and her family are also seen to be crazy. It is strongly suggested that she may have a mental illness, as she had taken medication in the past. Toni tells Alton that she can hear her dead grandmother, Annabel King, who instructs her while playing bridge.

Katie: Alton's girlfriend who ends their relationship at the start of the novel. She later on develops a relationship with Alton's best friend, Cliff. Later on in the novel, Katie tells Alton in a phone call that she suspects that Cliff might be cheating on her.

Cliff: Alton's best friend. He is cheeky and flirty. He dates Katie but later starts a brief relationship with Toni.

Leslie: Alton's sister. She was named after her Uncle Lester. She and Alton share a good relationship. She loves bridge but doesn't know how to play very well. Alton practices Bridge with her.

Gloria: Lester's partner in bridge. Although Lester has another partner in bridge called Wallace, Gloria plays with Lester more often. She knows a lot about Lester's past.

== Reception ==
The Cardturner has been called "an absolute page-turner" and a "funny and thoughtful novel".

Frank Cottrell Boyce of The Guardian writes that "The book feels like one long, deadpan dare, as though Sachar has made a bet with himself that he can make the most boring setting thrilling." and praises "The genius of Sachar's prose is that it's so plain and unshowy you don't notice the daredevil artistry of his storytelling until it's too late.". The New York Times suggests that The Cardturner "might be young adult literature’s first novel best read with an experienced partner and a full deck.". The book was also reviewed in the Bulletin of the Center for Children's Books.

It received the 2010 Alan Truscott Memorial Award from the International Bridge Press Association (IBPA).

== See also ==
- List of bridge books
