= Contract Bridge for Beginners =

Contract bridge book by Charles Goren

- 1953 cover of 31st printing
- Author: Charles Goren
- Language: English
- Genre: Non-fiction
- Publisher: Simon & Schuster
- Publication date: 1953
- Publication place: United States

Contract Bridge For Beginners is a book written by Charles Goren on the rules and basic strategies of contract bridge. First published by Simon & Schuster Inc. of New York in 1953 and by Eyre & Spottiswoode of London in 1959, each has been reprinted numerous times. The book contains an introduction to the then relatively new bidding system condensed from Goren's historically significant 1947 book Point Count Bidding in Contract Bridge.

Contract Bridge for Beginners is a "competent but unimaginative text" with a bidding system that is "of little practical use today" having been superseded by more modern methods.

== See also ==
- List of bridge books
- List of bridge magazines
