= Tim Bourke =

Australian bridge player and writer

- Born: 1947 (age 78–79)
- Occupations: Bridge player; writer

Tim Bourke is an Australian bridge player and writer. He is internationally renowned as a collector and composer of bridge hands, or deals, having composed most of those in David Bird's "Abbot" series since 1996.

He also put together the world's largest collections of English-language bridge books, magazines and Ephemara. Tim and his wife Margaret are in the process of donating this collection to the State Library of Victoria, (search the site "Tim & Margaret Bourke Bridge Collection"). The first three parts of the collection are now with the SLV but only 1733 of several thousand more items have been catalogued as of Feb 2016.

As a player, he has won nine Australian national titles but is now "retired as a tournament player".

He has a degree in mathematics and is an expert in the computer programming language APL and has written extensive bridge odds-calculating routines in that language as well as many bridge-related formatting routines. He is widely regarded as one of the world's most fertile composers of original single-dummy bridge problems.

He has had published over 50 reports on Australian and Zone 7 Teams Championships Finals. His 2010 publication Bridge Books in English 1886 to 2010 - an annotated bibliography with co-author John Sugden contains over 700 pages of listings. Bourke also assisted the late Anthony Moon in his multi-book project on bridge squeezes.

His joint project with Justin Corfield "the Art of Declarer Play" won the International Bridge Press Book of the Year award in 2014.

Bourke is an honorary member of IPBA, providing journalists with four deals per month for use without attribution as well as MS-Word documents based on BBO files from major championships around the world.

He was married to Margaret Bourke, a many-times International for Australia.

== Publications ==
- Kelsey, Hugh; Bourke, Tim (1993). Bridge Quiz for Improving Players. Victor Gollancz in association with Peter Crawley (London), 128 pages. ISBN 978-0-575-05536-0.
- Bird, David; Bourke, Tim (1996). Tournament Acol: a System for Winners. Victor Gollancz in association with Peter Crawley (London), 158 pages. ISBN 978-0-575-06113-2.
- Bourke, Tim; Smith, Marc (1999). Countdown to Winning Bridge. Master Point Press (Toronto), 214 pages. ISBN 978-1-894154-05-5.
- Bird, David; Bourke, Tim (2000). Saints and Sinners: The St. Titus Bridge Challenge. Master Point Press (Toronto), 192 pages. ISBN 978-1-894154-23-9.
- Silver, David; Bourke, Tim (2000). Bridge the Silver Way: a Third Collection of Bridge Stories. Master Point Press (Toronto), 189 pages. ISBN 978-1-894154-16-1.
- Bourke, Tim (2001). Maastricht Challenge: Bridge Quiz. B.T. Batsford (London), 128 pages. ISBN 978-0-7134-8715-2.
- Bird, David; Bourke, Tim (2001). The Magic of Bridge. Finesse Bridge Publications (London), 160 pages. ISBN 978-0-9538737-4-6.
- Bergen, Marty; Bourke, Tim (2001). Negative Doubles for Acol Players. Cassell in association with Peter Crawley (London), 128 pages. ISBN 978-0-304-35790-1.
- Bird, David; Bourke, Tim (2004). Elimination Plays. Test Your Bridge Technique. Master Point Press (Toronto), 103 pages. ISBN 978-1-894154-72-7.
- Bird, David; Bourke, Tim (2004). Entry Management. Test Your Bridge Technique. Master Point Press (Toronto), 83 pages. ISBN 978-1-894154-75-8.
- Bird, David; Bourke, Tim (2004). End Play and Coups. Test Your Bridge Technique. Master Point Press (Toronto), 105 pages. ISBN 978-1-894154-77-2.
- Bird, David; Bourke, Tim (2004). The Simple Squeeze. Test Your Bridge Technique. Master Point Press (Toronto), 110 pages. ISBN 978-1-894154-73-4.
- Bird, David; Bourke, Tim (2004). Planning in Suit Contracts. Test Your Bridge Technique. Master Point Press (Toronto), 103 pages. ISBN 978-1-894154-74-1.
- Bird, David; Bourke, Tim (2005). Reading The Cards. Test Your Bridge Technique. Master Point Press (Toronto), 100 pages. ISBN 978-1-894154-81-9.
- Bird, David; Bourke, Tim (2005). Avoidance Play. Test Your Bridge Technique. Master Point Press (Toronto), 92 pages. ISBN 978-1-894154-80-2.
- Bird, David; Bourke, Tim (2005). Safety Plays. Test Your Bridge Technique. Master Point Press (Toronto), 92 pages. ISBN 978-1-894154-79-6.
- Bird, David; Bourke, Tim (2005). Defending Notrump Contracts. Test Your Bridge Technique. Master Point Press (Toronto), 90 pages. ISBN 978-1-894154-82-6.
- Bird, David; Bourke, Tim (2005). Planning in Notrump Contracts. Test Your Bridge Technique. Master Point Press (Toronto), 104 pages. ISBN 978-1-894154-76-5.
- Bird, David; Bourke, Tim (2005). Defending Suit Contracts. Test Your Bridge Technique. Master Point Press (Toronto), 94 pages. ISBN 978-1-894154-78-9.
- Bird, David; Bourke, Tim (2005). Deceptive Play. Test Your Bridge Technique. Master Point Press (Toronto), 98 pages. ISBN 978-1-894154-83-3.
- Tim, Bourke; Sugden, John (2010). Bridge books in English from 1886-2010: an annotated bibliography. Bridge Book Buffs (Cheltenham). ISBN 978-0-9566576-0-2.

Bourke has also contributed articles to "The Bridge World", "Bridge Magazine", "Irish Bridge", "New Zealand Bridge" and, of course, to "Australian Bridge". He has provided articles to many Daily Bulletins of late, mostly as daily in a "Test Your Play" format.
