= Margaret Bourke =

Australian bridge player (1945–2021)

Margaret Bourke (11 November 1945 – August 2021) was an Australian bridge player.

== Bridge accomplishments ==
Margaret represented Australia on 31 occasions, more than any other player. This includes 15 World Championships, and 15 at Asia Pacific Championships, including 3 wins. She also had 74 wins in other national tournaments.

=== Wins ===
- Australian Bridge Championships (6)
- Asia Pacific Bridge Championships (3)

== Personal life ==
Margaret was born in Canberra to John Cumpston, a career diplomat, and Helen Cumpston, a university administrator at the Australian National University (ANU). For her tertiary education she moved to Melbourne where she became involved in bridge, and met her future husband Tim Bourke, who is also a Bridge player.

Margaret and her husband were prolific collectors of Bridge books and donated part of their collection to the State Library Victoria in Australia creating "the most extensive collection of books on the game of bridge in any public institution of the world".
