= Marc Smith (bridge) =

British bridge player, columnist and book author

Marc Smith (born 1960) is a British bridge player, columnist and writer. Marc Smith represented Great Britain as a junior, winning the 1985 European Union Junior Teams Championship. He has a host of wins in national events, and reached the final of the World Mixed Pairs Championship playing with his wife, Charlotte. His book, co-authored with Barbara Seagram, 25 Bridge Conventions You Should Know, won the American Bridge Teachers' Association 1999 Shirley Silverman Award for Best Student Book.

== Bridge columns ==
- Bridge (Britain)
- Bridge Plus (Britain)
- The OKbridge Spectator,
- ACBL Bridge Bulletin (USA)

== Publications ==
- Smith, Marc (1990). Enterprising Tales. Damien.
- Smith, Marc (1999). Man vs Machine: The Bridge Match of the Millennium. Bridge Plus, 96 pages. ISBN 978-1-902123-16-5.
- Smith, Marc (1999). World Class: Conversations with Bridge Masters. Master Point Press (Toronto), 288 pages. ISBN 1-894154-15-0.
- Bourke, Tim; Smith, Marc (1999). Countdown to Winning Bridge. Master Point Press (Toronto), 214 pages. ISBN 978-1-894154-05-5.
- Hoffman, Martin; Smith, Marc (2001). Over Hoffman's Shoulder. Finesse Bridge Publications (London), 159 pages. ISBN 978-0-9538737-3-9.
- Seagram, Barbara; Smith, Marc (1999). 25 Bridge Conventions You Should Know. Master Point Press (Toronto). ISBN 1-894154-07-X.
- Smith, Marc (2000). Practise Your Overcalling. Bridge Plus (Reading), 16 pages. ISBN 978-1-902123-21-9.
- Smith, Marc (2000). Bridge Cardplay - Attack and Defense. Finesse Bridge Publications (London). ISBN 0-9538737-2-2.
- Bird, David; Smith, Marc (2000). Entry Management. Master Point Press (Toronto), 62 pages. ISBN 978-1-894154-17-8.
- Bird, David; Smith, Marc (2000). Eliminations and Throw-ins. Master Point Press (Toronto), 58 pages. ISBN 978-1-894154-24-6.
- Bird, David; Smith, Marc (2000). Safety Plays. Master Point Press (Toronto), 61 pages. ISBN 978-1-894154-19-2.
- Bird, David; Smith, Marc (2000). Planning in Suit Contracts. Master Point Press (Toronto), 62 pages. ISBN 978-1-894154-26-0.
- Bird, David; Smith, Marc (2000). Tricks with Trumps. Master Point Press (Toronto), 62 pages. ISBN 978-1-894154-18-5.
- Bird, David; Smith, Marc (2000). Deceptive Card Play. Master Point Press (Toronto), 59 pages. ISBN 978-1-894154-25-3.
- Pottage, Julian; Smith, Marc (2000). The Golden Rules of Defence: (and when to break them). Victor Gollancz in association with Peter Crawley (London), 160 pages. ISBN 978-0-575-06845-2.
- Seagram, Barbara; Smith, Marc (2000). 25 Ways to Compete in the Bidding. Master Point Press (Toronto), 220 pages. ISBN 1-894154-22-3.
- Smith, Marc (2001). Practice Your Trial Bids. Bridge Plus (Bisley), 16 pages. ISBN 978-1-85665-020-5.
- Bird, David; Smith, Marc (2001). Reading the Cards. Master Point Press (Toronto), 61 pages. ISBN 978-1-894154-34-5.
- Bird, David; Smith, Marc (2001). Tricks with Finesses. Master Point Press (Toronto), 64 pages. ISBN 978-1-894154-35-2.
- Bird, David; Smith, Marc (2001). Planning the Play in Notrump. Master Point Press (Toronto), 61 pages. ISBN 978-1-894154-30-7.
- Bird, David; Smith, Marc (2001). Defensive Signalling. Master Point Press (Toronto), 62 pages. ISBN 978-1-894154-31-4.
- Bird, David; Smith, Marc (2001). Planning in Defense. Master Point Press (Toronto), 64 pages. ISBN 978-1-894154-36-9.
- Bird, David; Smith, Marc (2001). Squeeses Made Simple. Master Point Press (Toronto), 61 pages. ISBN 978-1-894154-32-1.
- Meckstroth, Jeff; Smith, Marc (2001). Win the Bermuda Bowl with Me. Master Point Press (Toronto), 188 pages. ISBN 978-1-894154-33-8.
- Pottage, Julian; Smith, Marc (2001). The Golden Rules of Declarer Play. Cassell in association with Peter Crawley (London), 160 pages. ISBN 978-0-304-35767-3.
- Pottage, Julian; Smith, Marc (2002). The Golden Rules of Constructive Bidding. Cassell in association with Peter Crawley (London), 128 pages. ISBN 978-0-304-36217-2.
- Pottage, Julian; Smith, Marc (2003). The Golden Rules of Competitive Auctions. Cassell in association with Peter Crawley (London), 160 pages. ISBN 978-0-304-36585-2.
- Seagram, Barbara; Smith, Marc (2010). The Pocket Guide to Bridge Conventions You Should Know. Master Point Press (Toronto), 72 pages. ISBN 1-897106-65-3.
