= Albert Dormer =

English bridge player, writer, and administrator

- Born: Albert George Dormer; 1925; Greenwich, London, UK
- Died: 18 March 2014 (aged 88–89); Scotland
- Occupations: Bridge player, writer and administrator
- Writing career
- Period: 1961– (as writer)
- Subject: Contract bridge

Albert George Dormer (1925 – 18 March 2014) was an English bridge player, writer and administrator.

== Biography ==
He won the Gold Cup in 1958 and 1963, and the World Senior Pairs in 1990 partnered by Alan Hiron. During his career as a bridge journalist, he spent a period as bridge editor for The Times, and was editor of British Bridge World, World Bridge News and the International Bridge Press Association Bulletin. He was also a contributing editor of The Official Encyclopedia of Bridge. He wrote ten books, all but one in collaboration with Terence Reese. He was the Executive Assistant to the World Bridge Federation (WBF) President from 1982 to 1986.

Dormer was the Reuters correspondent at world bridge championships during the 1970s and 1980s, and bridge correspondent of The Times for four years from 1990. He was the International Bridge Press Association (IBPA) Personality of the Year in 1981.

== Books ==
- The Acol System Today, Terence Reese and Albert Dormer, Edward Arnold Publishers, 1961
- Bridge for Tournament Players, Terence Reese and Albert Dormer, Robert Hale Ltd, 1968, ISBN 978-0709100034
- Play of the Cards, Terence Reese and Albert Dormer, Penguin Books, 1971, ISBN 978-0140461350
- How to Play a Good Game of Bridge, Terence Reese and Albert Dormer, Macmillan, 1971, ISBN 978-0330027908
- The Complete Book of Bridge, Terence Reese and Albert Dormer, Faber & Faber, 1974, ISBN 978-0571099047
- Powerhouse Hands, Albert Dormer, Robert Hale Ltd, 1976, ISBN 978-0709156000
- Bridge: The Acol System of Bidding, Terence Reese and Albert Dormer, Robert Hale Ltd, 1979, ISBN 978-0709173823
- The Bridge Player's Alphabetical Handbook, Terence Reese and Albert Dormer, Faber & Faber, 1981, ISBN 978-0571115990
- Dormer on Deduction (Master Bridge Series), Albert Dormer, Orion, 1995, ISBN 978-0575061156
- The New Complete Book of Bridge (Master Bridge Series), Terence Reese, Albert Dormer and Ron Klinger, Orion, 1996, ISBN 978-0575060845
