= List of contract bridge magazines =

Numerous magazines have been devoted to the card game contract bridge:

== United States ==
ACBL's Bridge Bulletin

- Auction Bridge Magazine Edited by Milton Work in the 1920s, this monthly magazine billed itself as the 'Official Organ of the Greatest of Games'.
- The Bridge World (TBW) was founded in 1929 by Ely Culbertson. TBW is generally regarded as the most prestigious bridge magazine. Currently, Jeff Rubens is editor and publisher. He took over from Edgar Kaplan who edited and published The Bridge World from 1967 to 1997. TBW is published monthly.
- Bridge Bulletin, a full-color magazine published monthly by the American Contract Bridge League. The Bridge Bulletin includes news and tips from top bridge teachers and experts, and is exclusive to ACBL members. Digital version available.
- The Bridge Journal, a quasi-monthly magazine; it published 30 issues from September 1963 to December 1966 and was produced by unpaid tournament enthusiasts hoping to improve the game. Defunct, its rights are owned by The Bridge World Magazine Inc. from whom a complete digital collection is available.
- The Bridge Set, founded and edited by George Bassman; defunct.
- Popular Bridge, a semi-monthly magazine with the first edition published as July–August, 1967 by Behn-Miller Publications of Encino, California; defunct. Principal authors were Edwin B. Kantar, Alfred Sheinwold, and Don von Elsner.
- Texas Bridge, a short-lived publication from that state.
- Better Bridge, a semi-monthly from Audrey Grant, for the advancing (largely intermediate) player.
- Modern Bridge, first published in January 1964 by L. Hampton Hume and edited by Richard A. Freeman.
- Sunshine Bridge News, Circulation nearly 20,000 published 6 times a year since 2005 by ACBL District 9 (bridge), Theri Andino-editor.

== Britain ==
- Bridge: (1) a title formerly used by Bridge Magazine; (2) a magazine published by "Mr Bridge", formerly funded by advertising and free to subscribers, then by paid subscription until it ceased publication after the December 2020 issue.
- The British Bridge World was founded by Hubert Phillips in 1932 and operated until 1939. Publication name revived in 1956 edited by Terence Reese as the successor to the Contract Bridge Journal; it ceased publication in 1964 and was incorporated into Bridge Magazine in 1965.
- Bridge International, a title formerly used by Bridge Magazine.
- Bridge Magazine, a monthly, was the oldest magazine devoted to the game, having been founded in 1926 by A. E. Manning Foster. It was not published during World War II, so had fewer issues than The Bridge World. In the June 2013 issue, the editor announced that in future the magazine would only be published online because the paper version had been losing too much money. In January 2018 it relaunched as a free magazine under the title A New Bridge Magazine, with Horton remaining as the editor. It ceased publication after the February, 2020 issue.
- Bridge Plus, a monthly magazine published between 1989 and 2008. No longer printed, it has been incorporated into Bridge Magazine.
- Contract Bridge Journal, inaugurated in 1946 as the official publication of the English Bridge Union and published until 1955 when its rights were purchased by Thomas De La Rue & Co. and replaced by the British Bridge World from 1956 until 1964 when that publication ceased.
- English Bridge Union Quarterly, a former title of English Bridge during the period from April 1966 to June 1984 when it was published every three months.
- English Bridge, the bi-monthly official publication of the English Bridge Union starting August 1984 and following on from the English Bridge Union Quarterly.
- International Popular Bridge Monthly, originally Popular Bridge Monthly, was published from 1980 to 1999.

== Others ==
- Australian Bridge
- Bridge, a Chinese monthly on bridge.
- Bridge Canada, the official publication of the Canadian Bridge Federation
- IMP (in Dutch)
- Bridge Tidningen (in Swedish)
- Le Bridgeur and Bridgerama (in French)
- Bridge d'Italia (in Italian)
- Bridge Magazin, the official publication of the Deutscher Bridge Verband.

== E-magazines ==
- Bridge Today , an online e-magazine.
- Bridgevaria.com, a website devoted to bridge by Ed Hoogenkamp, Peter van der Linden and Pien Steringa.

== See also ==
- List of contract bridge books
