= Géza Ottlik =

Hungarian translator, writer, and contract bridge theorist

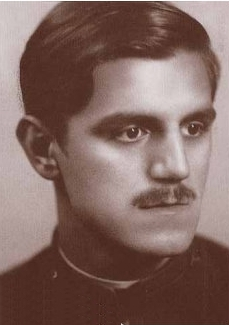
Géza Ottlik, c. 1930

Géza Ottlik (9 May 1912 – 9 October 1990) was a Hungarian writer, translator, mathematician, and bridge theorist. According to an American obituary bridge column, he was known in Hungary as "the ultimate authority on Hungarian prose".

== Biography ==
Ottlik was born and died in Budapest. He attended the military school at Kőszeg and Budapest, and studied mathematics and physics at Budapest University 1931–1935. After a brief career on Hungarian radio, he was a secretary of Hungarian PEN Club from 1945 to 1957. As he was unable to publish his works for political reasons, he earned his living translating. He translated mainly from English (Charles Dickens, George Bernard Shaw, John Osborne, Evelyn Waugh); and German (Thomas Mann, G. Keller, Stefan Zweig).

He was a passionate bridge player and advanced theoretician. In a bridge column three months after Ottlik's death, Alan Truscott placed him "among the strongest candidates" for "the bridge writer with the greatest creativity in terms of card-play theory". His 1979 book Adventures in Card Play, written with Hugh Kelsey, introduced and developed many new concepts (such as Backwash squeeze and Entry-shifting squeeze). According to Truscott it "opened new frontiers" in defence as well as declarer play. In his 1995 obituary of Kelsey, Truscott wrote that it "broke new ground in many technical areas and is still considered the most advanced book on the play of the cards." An American survey of bridge experts in 2007 ranked it third on a list of their all-time favourites, nearly thirty years after its first publication.

From October 1944 to February 1945, Ottlik and his wife Gyöngyi Debreczeni hid the writer István Vas, a Jew, in their apartment and shared their food rations with him. Géza personally intervened to obtain the release of Vas' mother from arrest; if he had not done so, she would have been sent on a death march towards Germany. Gyöngyi faced down a group of Arrow Cross Party members who had broken into the apartment to search for the Jew allegedly hiding there; they left without discovering Vas, who survived World War II. For this, the couple were honoured on 4 June 1998 by Yad Vashem as people Righteous Among the Nations.

== Awards ==
- Ottlik received a grant from the British Government for his translations, 1960
- József Attila Prize (1981)
- Kossuth Prize for Literature (1985)
- Righteous Among the Nations (1998)

== Publications ==
- Hamisjátékosok (Swindlers; stories) (1941)
- Hajnali háztetők (Rooftops at Dawn; novella) (1957)
- Iskola a határon (School at the Frontier; novel) (1959)
- Minden megvan (Nothing's Lost; short stories) (1969, revised and enlarged 1991)
- Adventures in Card Play, Ottlik and Hugh Kelsey (Victor Gollancz Ltd, 1979), 285 pp., OCLC 16423055 – on declarer play and defence in bridge
- Próza (Prose; essays, interviews) (1980)
- A Valencia-rejtély (The Valencia Enigma; novel) (1989)
- Hajónapló (Logbook; novel) (1989)
- Buda (novel) (1993)
