= Martin Hoffman (bridge) =

Czech-born British professional bridge player (1929–2018)

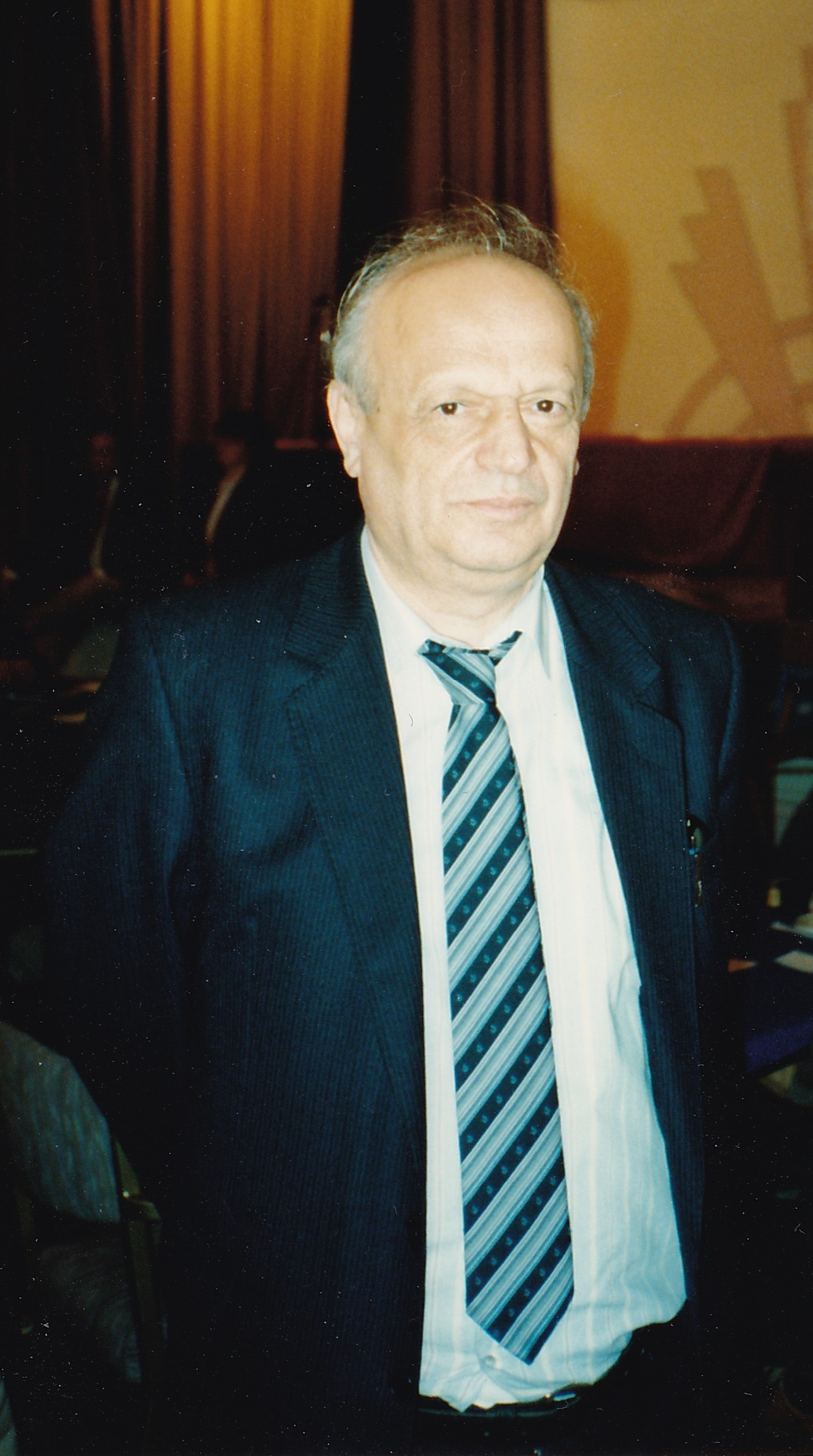
- Born: 15 November 1929; Prague, Czechoslovakia
- Died: 15 May 2018 (aged 88)
- Occupation: Bridge player
- Notable work: Hoffman on Pairs Play

Martin Joseph Hoffman (15 November 1929 – 15 May 2018) was a Czech-born British professional bridge player and writer.

== Biography ==
Hoffman was born in Prague, in what was then the First Czechoslovak Republic (which, in the English-speaking world, was often called Czecho-Slovakia). His father and mother were Herman and Toby. He had a younger brother and two sisters. When he was not yet nine years old, he and his brother were sent to stay with his mother's parents in the Carpathians, where they studied the Torah. After the German occupation of Czechoslovakia, his parents were deported to Theresienstadt, where they died. Hoffman, his brother, and his grandparents went into hiding; but in 1944 they were arrested and transported to Auschwitz. A Sonderkommando advised Hoffman to pretend that he was 18, even though he was not yet 14. He was later moved to the Monowitz-Buna, Gross Rosen and Birkenau sub-camps of Auschwitz; and from there he was sent on a death march towards Buchenwald. In 1945, he was liberated by American Army troops, who adopted him as mascot, with the honorary rank of sergeant.

After the end of the war, he was relocated to a rehabilitation hostel near Windermere in north-west England. While on a holiday from there, in Torquay in south-west England, he was befriended by a family from Finchley, north London; they offered him a job as a diamond cutter, took him in, and taught him to play whist. (Note: It is unclear whether this was whist or solo whist; probably the latter; the game of whist was by then not often played.) He rapidly became addicted to the game. He took up bridge only because some Russian friends asked him to make up a four, and he found the game even more interesting than whist. The diamond trade was not good in the 1950s, and he turned to card-playing for a living; he was a host, that is, a player retained by a bridge club proprietor to make up a table whenever needed but who kept some share of his winnings. He did not play in a duplicate bridge event until the remarkably late age of 35. He and his partner won the event by a wide margin; and he realised for the first time that this was a game he could succeed in as well as enjoy. From then on, he began to offer his services as a paid partner in Europe and beyond, and became widely known as a formidable competitor.

His philosophy of bridge is, "[..] I don't consider systems to be particularly important. It is a mistake, in my opinion, to work out a detailed system and stick to it. If you have the reputation of being a player who always makes the book bid and lead you become easy to play against.

He was called the best duplicate pairs bridge player in Europe.

His autobiography, Bridging Two Worlds, which includes many terrible details about his Holocaust experiences, was originally circulated privately, but has been published by Masterpoint Press.

== Accomplishments ==
These include:

- Crockford's Cup winner: 1981
- Spring Foursomes winner: 1969 and 1976
- Brighton Pairs, Harold Poster Cup: 1970, 1987 and 2011
- Easter Congress Guardian Trophy winner: 1969, 1976 and 1982
- National Pairs winner: 1966
- Hubert Phillips Bowl winner: 1970
- Tollemache Trophy winner: 1967
- Master Bridge, a televised programme by Channel 4, winner: 1982. The other contestants included Omar Sharif, Zia Mahmood and Rixi Markus.

== Publications ==
- Hoffman, Martin (1982). Hoffman on Pairs Play. Faber and Faber. ISBN 0-571-11750-3.
- Hoffman, Martin (1983). More Tales of Hoffman. Faber and Faber. ISBN 9780571131464. (Note: The title parodies that of The Tales of Hoffmann, opéra fantastique by Jacques Offenbach.)
- Reese, Terence; Hoffman, Martin (1 April 1986). Play It Again Sam. Baron Barclay Bridge Supplies. ISBN 9780910791212.
- Jourdain, Patrick; Hoffman, Martin (30 June 2003). Imagination and Technique in Bridge (reprinted ed.). Batsford Books. ISBN 9780713485646.
- Hoffman, Martin (2003). Bridge: Defence in Depth: How to Beat Cast-Iron Contracts (reprinted ed.). Batsford Books. ISBN 9780713481853.
- Bird, David; Hoffman, Martin (2002). Bridge For Money. Finesse Bridge. ISBN 9780953873753.
- Wei, Kathy; Hoffman, Martin (1 March 2003). The Wei of Good Bridge (reprinted ed.). Batsford Books. ISBN 9780713488012.
- Bird, David; Hoffman, Martin (1 May 2003). Inspired Cardplay. Cassell. ISBN 9780304365869.
- Hoffman, Martin (2019). Bridging Two Worlds. Masterpoint Press. ISBN 978-1-77140-199-9.
