= Bridge d'Italia =

Italian bridge magazine

- Categories: Contract bridge magazine
- Frequency: Ten times annually
- Founded: 1938
- First issue: January 1938
- Country: Italy
- Based in: Milan
- Language: Italian
- Website: Bridge d'Italia

Bridge d'Italia is the official magazine for the Italian contract bridge game federation, Federazione Italiana Gioco Bridge (FIGB). It has been published since January 1938.

== History ==
The magazine was first published in January 1938 under the title Bollettino Mensile (Monthly Bulletin). In November that year the title was changed by the Fascist administration to the Monthly Bulletin of the Italian Ponte Association.

Between December 1941 and 1946 the magazine temporarily ceased publication due to World War II. In 1946 the magazine could publish only one issue with the title Bridge, and from 1947 its frequency was made monthly.

Bridge d'Italia has a print and an online edition. The print edition is published ten times a year. The magazine is headquartered in Milan.

== Editors ==
In 1953 the magazine was renamed as Bridge d'Italia of which editor-in-chief was Cesare Guglielmetti. The other editors-in-chief were Luigi Firbo who succeeded Cesare Guglielmetti in 1957 and held the post until June 1970 when Guido Barbone was appointed to the post. From April 1986 Riccardo Vandoni was made the editor-in-chief of the magazine.

== See also ==
- The Bridge World
- List of contract bridge magazines
