= Hugh Kelsey =

British bridge player and writer

Hugh Walter Kelsey (1926 – 18 March 1995) was a British bridge player and writer, best known for advanced books on the play of the cards.

== Life ==
Kelsey was born and died in Edinburgh. He was a combatant in World War II, and subsequently lived for a long time in Malaya. Before he turned to writing about bridge, he was the author of two detective novels.

Kelsey was a resident of Edinburgh when he died there on 18 March 1995, presumably from "repeated cardiac problems", in the words of Alan Truscott, citing his son George. He was survived by his wife Flora, two sons, and two daughters.

== Bridge career ==
He won the Gold Cup, the most prestigious British competition, twice, in 1969 and 1980. He represented Scotland twelve times in the Camrose Trophy, played between the constituent countries of the British Isles. He was the non-playing captain of the Great Britain women's team in the 7th World Team Olympiad held at Seattle in 1984.

However, he was most famous and will be remembered as a writer. He wrote some fifty books on the game, mostly aimed at intermediate to advanced players. It is a measure of their quality that many of them were still in print more than a decade after his death. Two of his books, Killing Defence at Bridge and Advanced Play at Bridge, were listed by the Official Encyclopedia of Bridge as "mandatory requirements for a modern technical bridge library". Adventures in Card Play by Kelsey and Géza Ottlik (Gollancz, 1979) is regarded by many as the most advanced book on the play of the cards. (Note: Alan Truscott wrote in 1995 obituary of Kelsey that Adventures in Card Play "broke new ground in many technical areas and is still considered the most advanced book on the play of the cards." Concerning the same work in 1991, he had placed Ottlik "among the strongest candidates" for "the bridge writer with the greatest creativity in terms of card-play theory", and credited the book with "open[ing] new frontiers" in defence as well as declarer play.) It introduced and developed many new concepts such as backwash squeeze and entry-shifting squeeze. Bridge experts surveyed by the American Contract Bridge League (ACBL) in 2007 ranked it third on a list of their favourite books, nearly thirty years after its first publication.

Kelsey was bridge columnist for the Edinburgh newspaper The Scotsman, wrote many articles for bridge magazines, and was general editor for the Gollancz Master Bridge series. He was the International Bridge Press Association Personality of the Year in 1993.

The Scottish Bridge Union holds an annual Hugh Kelsey Tournament. This is open to all those in Scotland who are currently receiving lessons.

== Publications ==
Bridge

- Killing Defence at Bridge (Faber & Faber, 1966); first US ed., Hart, 1967 OCLC 1352496
- Advanced Play at Bridge (Faber, 1968)
- More Killing Defence at Bridge (Faber, 1972)
- How to Improve Your Bridge (1973)
- Slam Bidding (1973)
- Match-Point Bridge (1976)
- Logical Bridge Play (Faber, 1976)
- Learn Bridge for Fun (1976)
- Adventures In Card Play, Kelsey and Géza Ottlik (Victor Gollancz Ltd, 1979) – "in association with Peter Crawley", 285 pages OCLC 16423055
- Winning Card Play (1979)
- The Tough Game (1979)
- Bridge Odds for Practical Players (1980), with Michael Glauert
- Bridge: The Mind of the Expert (Faber, 1981)
- Sharpen Your Bridge Technique: How to think like an expert (Faber, 1981)
- Improve Your Opening Leads (1982), with John Matheson
- Deceptive Plays in Bridge (1982)
- The Needle Match (Faber, 1982)
- Simple Squeezes: Kelsey on squeeze play (Gollancz/Crawley, 1985) OCLC 13456303
- Bridge Wizardry (1986)
- Bridge for the Connoisseur (Gollancz/Crawley, 1991)
- New Instant Guide To Bridge (1993)
- Acol Bridge for Bright Beginners (1995)
- Kelsey on Squeeze Play (2002) – compilation of Simple Squeezes (1985), Strip Squeezes, Double Squeezes, and Triple Squeezes

Novels

- A Bullet for Charles (1955), as by Hugh Walter, his given names
- Please Don't Squeeze the Trees (1964)
