= Louis H. Watson =

American bridge player

Louis Henry Watson (September 27, 1906 – February 14, 1936) was a highly ranked American contract bridge player and writer who rose to prominence in the 1930s. A popular personality and one of the most brilliant of the younger generation of contract bridge players, he was considered by Ely Culbertson to be his most likely successor, but died of a sudden heart attack before his 30th birthday.

== Biography ==
Watson was born in 1906 in New York City, the son of stockbroker and railroad executive Louis Thompson Watson (1863–1925). He was educated at Phillips Academy Andover and Columbia University. At Columbia, he played alongside fellow students Sam Fry and Oswald Jacoby.

In 1926, while still at Columbia, he and Catherine Potter of Simsbury, Connecticut eloped in Port Chester, New York, getting married at 1 a.m. at the home of the justice of the peace. They had originally driven to Greenwich, Connecticut but discovered they could not get a wedding license, so came back over the state line into Westchester County. They had to wake up both the town clerk and justice of the peace for the ceremony. The following day, they were married again at Saint Thomas Episcopal Church on Fifth Avenue. The mother of the bride gave her away, and the new Mrs. Watson told The New York Times her family "thoroughly approved" of the marriage.

After graduating in 1927, Watson initially began working on Wall Street but within a few years left a career in finance to play bridge full-time. His promising career was short-lived, however.

Watson died suddenly at age 29 of a heart attack. On Valentine's Day 1936, he began suffering chest pain after lunch, summoned a doctor and was advised to lie down. Within three hours, he died in bed at his home on 192 East 75th Street. He had not shown any previous signs of illness or heart problems. He was survived by his wife and their adopted son, Louis Thompson Watson (1935–2003), and his sister.

His death was two weeks prior to the Eastern championships, then the largest annual bridge meet, and he was the incumbent winner of the Mueller trophy for its best overall performance. According to Morehead, "There was no one in the world of bridge more popular personally than Mr. Watson; he alone of the five or six nationally known authorities had no known enemies."

Watson was a contributing editor of The Bridge World and bridge columnist for the New York Evening Post. His book Watson on the Play of the Hand at Contract Bridge, published in 1934, was enlarged and modernized by Sam Fry, Jr. in 1958 as Watson's Classic Book on the Play of the Hand at Bridge. As such it is still considered a classic by experts and other bridge readers of today.

In 2012 the American Contract Bridge League (ACBL) named Watson number 52 of the 52 most influential personalities in the organization's history for his playing expertise and writings on bridge.

== Bridge accomplishments ==
=== Wins ===
- American Bridge League (ABL)
  - National Challenge Team-of-Four Championship, Asbury Park Trophy, prior to the ACBL Spingold (1932 and 1935)
  - Mixed Team-of-Four (1935), see Chicago Mixed Board-a-Match
- Cavendish Club Invitational (1933)
- American Whist League
  - All American Pair (1933, 1934)
  - All American Team-of-Four (1933, 1934)
- Georgia State South-eastern Sectional
  - Team-of-Four (1931)

=== Runners-up ===
- American Bridge League (ABL)
  - Fall National Open Pairs (1931, 1932)
  - Eastern Pair 1930
  - Eastern Team-of-Four 1933
  - National Team-of-Four 1933
  - Vanderbilt Trophy Team-of-Four (1933, 1935)
  - Men's Pair (1935)

== Publications ==
- Watson, Louis H. (1934). Watson on the Play of the Hand at Contract Bridge. Lewis Copeland Co. (New York). 492 pp.

Reprint with index (Bronx: Ishi Press, 2008). ISBN 0-923891-74-9 OCLC 374459011

- ———; Bloom, Isaac H. (1935). Culbertson System Self-Teacher. Contract Bridge Pub. (Pittsburgh). 80 pp. OCLC 669961304
- ——— (1934). The Outline of Contract Bridge. Grosset & Dunlap. 333 pp.
- ———; Fry, Sam Jr. (1959). Watson's Classic Book on the Play of the Hand at Bridge. Barnes & Noble. ISBN 0-06-463209-1. "Edited and modernized by Sam Fry." 475 pp.

Pamphlets

- Pocket Guide of Modern Leads (New York: Bard Bridge Bureau, 193?) OCLC 319215333
