= David Bird (bridge) =

British contract bridge writer

David Bird

David Lyster Bird (born 29 March 1946) is a British bridge writer from Eastleigh, with more than 130 bridge books to his name. He was born in London and is bridge correspondent for the Mail on Sunday and the London Evening Standard. He contributes regularly to many magazines, including Bridge Plus, English Bridge, Bridge Magazine and the ACBL Bridge Bulletin. He has been a co-author of books with some of the world's leading players or writers, including Terence Reese, Ron Klinger, Geir Helgemo, Tony Forrester, Omar Sharif, Martin Hoffman and Barbara Seagram. His series of humorous bridge stories featuring the monks of the St Titus monastery has run continuously in Bridge Magazine for 30 years; many of them have subsequently been collected in book form.

Bird was described by Alan Truscott, in July 2003, as "long one of the world's top bridge writers". He is claimed to be the world's most prolific current bridge writer, having published his one hundredth book in March 2010. Within a year he reached 108, surpassing Terence Reese (1913–1996). As of mid-2020, Bird has authored or co-authored 141 published books on contract bridge.

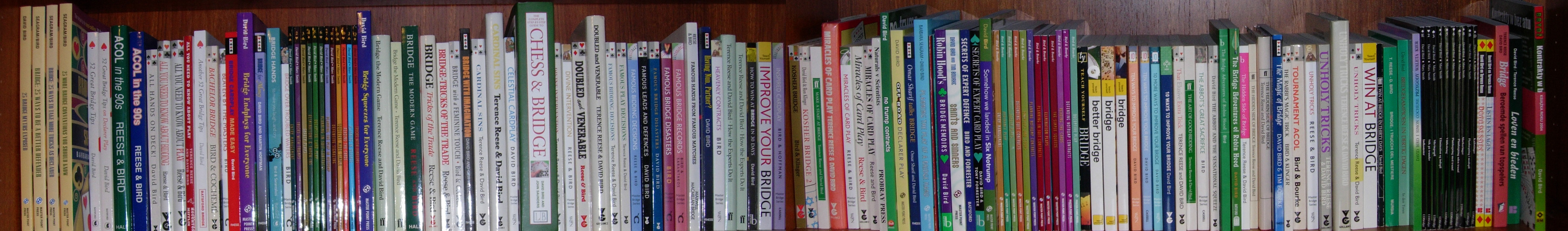
The books of David Bird (2010 photo by Bird)
