= Roy Hughes (bridge) =

Canadian bridge writer and player

Roy Hughes (born 1954) is a Canadian contract bridge writer and expert player. He won the International Bridge Press Association (IBPA) Book of the Year award in 2007 for Canada's Bridge Warriors, about the Canadian pair Eric Murray and Sami Kehela. That was his third bridge book, and the first two had been finalists for the IBPA award, Building a Bidding System and Card By Card. His fourth book, The Contested Auction, won the 2012 award (now sponsored by his publisher Master Point Press).

Hughes lives in Toronto, Canada.

== Books ==
- Building a Bidding System (Toronto: Master Point Press, 2005), 148 pp. OCLC 59876218
- Card by Card: Adventures at the Bridge Table (Master Point, 2006), 240 pp. OCLC 62346634
- Canada's Bridge Warriors: Eric Murray and Sami Kehela (Master Point, 2007), 336 pp. OCLC 77549916
- The Contested Auction at Bridge (Master Point, 2012), 336 pp. OCLC 794031203
- Further Adventures at the Bridge Table (Master Point, 2013) OCLC 862010279
