= Edwin Kantar bibliography =

This is the Edwin Kantar bibliography.

Edwin Kantar is a bridge player and writer with over 35 bridge books written since 1960; he is a regular contributor to the ACBL Bridge Bulletin, The Bridge World, and Bridge Today. In a survey of bridge writers and players, Complete Defensive Bridge Play was among the top 10 of all-time favorite bridge books. Kantar won the American Bridge Teachers Association (ABTA) award for Best Book of the Year four times.

Co-author(s)	Title	Editions and Printings	Notes
	A New Lessons Series	1960: Eddie Kantar, 47p.	
	Bidding	1963: Kantar (Los Angeles), 37p.; 1965: Revised, 52p.	
	Defensive Play	1964: Eddie Kantar, 29p.; 1967: Revised 1967, 51p.	
	Play of the Hand Complete	1965: Eddie Kantar, 108p.	
	A Comprehensive Bridge Manual	1965: Eddie Kantar, 122p.; 1967: Revised, 143p.	
	How to Win at Bridge	1967: Wilshire Book Company (North Hollywood, CA), Wilshire Self-Improvement Library, 143p.	
	Introduction to Declarer's Play	1968: Wilshire Book Company (North Hollywood, CA), ISBN 978-0-87980-401-5, 142p.; 1968: Prentice Hall (Endlewood Cliffs, NJ), 147p.; 1971: Muller (London), ISBN 978-0-584-10393-9, 147p	
	Introduction to Defender's Play	1968: Wilshire Book Company (North Hollywood, CA), 153p.; 1968: Prentice Hall (Endlewood Cliffs, NJ), 153p.; 1971: Muller (London), ISBN 978-0-584-10394-6, 153p.; 1977: Wilshire Book Company (North Hollywood, CA), ISBN 978-0-87980-322-3, 153p.	
	Bridge Bidding Made Easy: A Modern Guide to the Language of the Game	1972: Wilshire Book Co. (North Hollywood, CA), 256p.; 1974: Reprinted, 272p., ISBN 978-0-87980-012-3; 1978: Reprinted, 272p.	
Jackson, Stanley	Gamesman Bridge: Play Better with Kantar	1972: Liveright Publishing Corporation (New York), 177p., ISBN 978-0-87140-543-2; 1972: Wilshire Book Company (North Hollywood, CA), 177p., ISBN 978-0-87980-391-9; 1974: Bantam Books (New York), 165p.	
	Bridge Conventions: A Guide to Understanding Techniques of Modern Bidding	1972, 1974, 1977: Wilshire Book Company (North Hollywood, CA), 133p., ISBN 978-0-87980-013-0	
	Test Your Bridge Play: Volume 1, 100 Declarer-Play Problems Designed to Improve Your Card Playing Techniques	1974, 1976: Wilshire Book Company (North Hollywood, CA), 201p., ISBN 978-0-87980-286-8	
	Defensive Bridge Play Complete	1974, 1975, 1976: Wilshire Book Company (North Hollywood, CA), 528p., ISBN 978-0-87980-287-5	Tile on spine: Complete Defensive Bridge Play
	Fifty-two Facts of Bridge Life	1975-2007: Various Publishers, 12p.	
	Bridge Humor	1977: Wilshire Book Company (North Hollywood, CA), Melvin Powers Self-improvement Library, 151p., ISBN 978-0-87980-342-1	
	An Expert's Guide to Improving Your Bidding Skills	1980: Wilshire Book Company (North Hollywood, CA), 151p., ISBN 978-0-87980-380-3	
Reese, Terence	Defend with Your Life	1981: Faber and Faber (London and Boston), 160p., ISBN 978-0-571-11711-6; 1981: Squeeze Books (Poughkeepsie, N.Y.),150p., ISBN 978-1-58776-146-1	
	Test Your Bridge Play: Volume 2, 100 Declarer-Play Problems Designed to Improve Card Playing Techniques for Bridge Players Who Are Sick and Tired of Going Down in Cold Contracts	1981: Wilshire Book Company (North Hollywood, CA), 234p., ISBN 978-0-87980-390-2	
	Kantar For The Defense, Volume 1	1983: Wilshire Book Co. (North Hollywood, CA), Melvin Powers Self-improvement Library, 200p., ISBN 978-0-87980-400-8	
	Kantar For the Defense, Volume 2	1984: Wilshire Book Co. (North Hollywood, CA), Melvin Powers Self-improvement Library, 200p., ISBN 978-0-87980-409-1	
	The Forcing Pass in Contract Bridge	1984: H And F Consulting, 72p., ISBN 978-0-87643-044-6	
	A New Approach to Play and Defense, Volume 1	1986: HDL Publishing Company (Costa Mesa, CA), Kantar on Bridge, 204p., ISBN 978-0-937359-01-3	American Bridge Teachers Association (ABTA) Book of the Year 1986
	A New Approach to Play and Defense, Volume 2: 100 New Problems-In Matched Pairs-To Play Both Ways	1987: Griffin Publishing Group (Glendale CA), Kantar on Bridge, 204p, ISBN 978-1-882180-08-0; 1987: HDL Publishing Company (Costa Mesa, CA), 204p., ISBN 978-0-937359-22-8, ISBN 978-1-882180-07-3	
	Kantar Lessons I-IV [Monograms]	1988-2000: Eddie Kantar (Venice CA), Lesson I: 1988 / Lesson II: 1989 / Lesson III: 1996 / Lesson IV: 2000	Lesson III was American Bridge Teachers Association (ABTA) Book of the Year 1996
	The Best of Eddie Kantar: Funny Stories from the Bridge Table	1989: Granovetter Books, 214p., ISBN 978-0-940257-03-0	
	Roman Keycard Blackwood: The Untold Story	1991: Granovetter Book (Ballston Lake, NY), ISBN 978-0-940257-09-2, 1991, 128p.; 1993: Reprinted, C&T Bridge Supplies (Los Alamitos, CA), ISBN 978-0-9628297-4-1, 141p.; 1995: Robert Hale Limited, ISBN 978-0-7090-5641-6, 118p.; 2004: 4th Edition: Roman Keycard Blackwood: Slam Bidding for the 21st Century, Master Point Press, Revised and Updated, ISBN 978-1-894154-88-8, 266p.; 2008: 5th Edition: Roman Keycard Blackwood: The Final Word, Master Point Press	
	A Treasury of Bridge Tips: 540 Bidding Tips to Improve Your Partner's Game	1992: Griffin Publishing (Glendale, CA), Kantar on Bridge, ISBN 978-1-882180-06-6; 1992: Howland Publishing (Santa Ana, CA), ISBN 978-0-9630970-0-2; 2002: Second Edition: Griffin Publishing (Torrance, CA), 163p., ISBN 978-1-58000-093-2	
	Take Your Tricks: Over 550 Declarer Play Tips That You Can Take To The Bank	1993: Griffin Publishing Inc (Glendale, CA), Kantar on Bridge, 210p., ISBN 978-1-882180-04-2	
	Defensive Tips For Bad Card Holders: Over Five-Hundred Hands to Improve Your Defensive Play	1994: Griffin Publishing Group (Glendale, CA), Kantar on Bridge, 278p., ISBN 978-1-882180-21-9	
	Bridge for Dummies	1997: IDG Books Worldwide (Foster City, CA), ISBN 978-0-7645-5015-7, 382p.; 2006: Second Edition: Wiley Publishing Inc., (Hoboken, NJ), 388p., ISBN 978-0-471-92426-5; 2008: Large Print Edition: Thorndike Press (Waterville, Me), 563p., ISBN 978-1-4104-0503-6; 2012: Third Edition: Wiley Publishing Inc., (Hoboken, NJ), 432p., ISBN 978-1-118-20574-7; 2016: Fourth Edition: Wiley Publishing Inc., (Hoboken, NJ), 432p., ISBN 978-1-119-24782-1	American Bridge Teachers Association (ABTA) Book of the Year 1997
	Eddie Kantar Teaches Modern Bridge Defense	1999: Master Point Press (Toronto), 240p., ISBN 978-1-894154-02-4	American Bridge Teachers Association (ABTA) Book of the Year 1999
	Eddie Kantar Teaches Advanced Bridge Defense	1999: Master Point Press (Toronto), 240p., ISBN 978-1-894154-03-1	American Bridge Teachers Association (ABTA) Book of the Year 1999
	Classic Kantar: A Collection of Bridge Humor	1999: Master Point Press (Toronto), 190p., ISBN 978-1-894154-14-7	
	Eddie Kantar Teaches Topics in Declarer Play at Bridge	2002: Master Point Press (Toronto), 220p., ISBN 978-1-894154-53-6	
	Kantar on Kontract	2004: Master Point Press (Toronto), 154p., ISBN 978-1-894154-68-0	
	Thinking Bridge: Kantar Lesson Hands 1-100	2005: Edwin Kantar, 100p.	
