= Audrey Grant =

Audrey Lindop Grant is a Canadian professional educator and a contract bridge teacher and writer known for her simple and humorous approach to the game. Grant is from Toronto, Ontario, Canada.

Grant and the world champion player Eric Rodwell co-wrote The Joy of Bridge and Bridge Maxims – full-length, primarily instructional books published in 1984 and 1987. Audrey Grant's Better Bridge was a series of instructional books published in 1995. She also wrote the ACBL Bridge series, or American Contract Bridge League introduction to bridge series, a set of five instructional books published by the ACBL:1994 Bidding, Play of the Hand, Defense, Commonly Used Conventions, and More Commonly Used Conventions. She has written several other bridge books too.

Grant also publishes the bi-monthly Better Bridge Magazine. Started in 2004, this magazine includes articles and hints related to bridge.

As well, Grant publishes an online bridge column every day. Started in 2012, this column includes bidding quizzes, declarer-play practice, and practice defending.

In 2012 the ACBL named Grant number 43 of the 52 most influential people during the 75-year lifetime of the organization. It cited her teaching and writing on bridge, as well as many years work as its educational consultant.

Grant was inducted into the ACBL Hall of Fame in 2015.

== Publications ==
- The Joy of Bridge (New York: Arco, 1984), ISBN 0668062711
- Bridge Maxims: secrets of better play (Prentice-Hall, 1987), ISBN 0130819360
- Grant, Audrey (1994). ACBL Bridge Series: Bidding. Memphis: American Contract Bridge League. ISBN 0-943855-00-4.
- 2 Over 1 Game Force (2009) with Eric Rodwell. ISBN 978-0-939460-84-7
