= Ron Klinger =

Australian bridge player and writer

- Born: 8 November 1941 (age 84); Shanghai, China
- Occupations: Contract bridge player, writer
- Years active: 1970s–present
- Known for: Author of over 70 bridge books
- Notable work: Guide to Better Card Play, Right Through the Pack Again
- Awards: American Bridge Teachers' Association Best Book of the Year (1991)

Ron Klinger (born 8 November 1941) is an Australian contract bridge player and a leading English-language bridge writer, the author of more than 70 books on the game. He is an Australian Grand Master and a World Bridge Federation International Master.

Klinger was born in Shanghai, China, one month before the December 1941 completion of the Japanese occupation, and has lived in Sydney, Australia, since 1946.

He was editor of Australian Bridge for thirteen years starting in 1972. He was also the bridge columnist for the Australian Women's Weekly and later, The Daily Telegraph and The Weekend Australian. He currently writes a weekly bridge column for the Sydney Morning Herald and a weekly column for The Sun-Herald. He is also a regular contributor to Australian Bridge magazine and Britain's Bridge Magazine, and is the author of over 70 books on bridge. His book Guide to Better Card Play won the American Bridge Teachers' Association (ABTA) Best Book of the Year Award in 1991.

Right Through the Pack Again won the 2010 International Bridge Press Association Book of the Year Award. Klinger has played for Australia in the World Teams Championships in 1976, 1978, 1980, 1984, 1988, 1989, 1993, 2000, and each year from 2003 to 2016. He won the Pacific-Asian Open Teams in 1970, the Pacific-Asia Seniors Teams in 2006 and has won the Pacific Asian Open Pairs twice. In the 1976 World Open Teams Olympiad, he won the Bols Brilliancy Prize for best play.

== Publications ==
- Bridge Basics (Standard American) (1972) sixth edition 2010
- Playing to Win at Bridge (1976)
- How to Play Contract Bridge (1981)
- Standard Bridge Flipper (1983)
- Acol Bridge Flipper (1983)
- Cue-Bidding to Slams (Standard American) (1983)
- Improve Your Bridge Memory (1984)
- The Bridge Player Who Laughed (1984)
- Bridge Made Easy (Standard American) (1985)
- Acol Bridge Made Easy (1986)
- The Modern Losing Trick Count (Standard American) (1986)
- 100 Winning Tips (1987)
- The Modern Losing Trick Count (Acol) (1987)
- Guide to Better Bridge (Standard American) (1987), 2nd edition 1990
- Guide to Better Acol Bridge (1988)
- Medium Club Relay (with Alex Fransz) (1988)
- Bridge for Children (1989)
- Guide To Better Card Play (Standard American) (1990) (winner, American Bridge Teachers' Association Book of the Year)
- Guide To Better Card Play (Acol)
- Teach Your Child Bridge (Acol) 1990
- Five-Card Majors (1992)
- Kosher Bridge (with David Bird) (1992)
- The Power System (1993)
- New Instant Guide to Bridge (with Hugh Kelsey) (1993)
- Bridge Conventions for You (with Andrew Kambites) (1994)
- Kosher Bridge 2 (with David Bird) (1994)
- Guide to Better Duplicate Bridge (Standard American) (1995)
- Guide to Better Duplicate Bridge (Acol) (1995)
- Basic Acol Bridge (1996)
- Cue-Bidding to Slams (Acol) (1996)
- The New Complete Book of Bridge (with Terence Reese and Albert Dormer) (1996)
- Practical Slam Bidding (Standard American) (1997)
- Card Play Made Easy 1: Safety Plays and Endplays (with Andrew Kambites) (1997)
- Card Play Made Easy 2: Know Your Suit Combinations (with Andrew Kambites) (1997)
- 5-Card Majors (1998)
- Better Bridge With a Better Memory (1998)
- Card Play Made Easy 3: Trump Management (with Andrew Kambites) (1998)
- Opening Leads (with Mike Lawrence) (1998)
- Opening Leads Flipper (with Mike Lawrence) (1998)
- Modern Losing Trick Count Flipper (1998)
- Practical Slam Bidding (Acol) (1998)
- The Rabbi's Magic Trick (More Kosher Bridge) (with David Bird) (1998)
- 100 Winning Duplicate Tips (1999)
- Bridge Conventions, Defences and Countermeasures (1999)
- Card Play Made Easy 4: Timing and Communications (with Andrew Kambites) (1999)
- Improve your Bidding and Play (with Derek Rimington) (1999)
- The Law of Total Tricks Flipper (1999)
- How Good is Your Bridge Hand? (with Andrew Kambites) (2000)
- Bid Better, Much Better (Standard American) (2000)
- Bid Better, Much Better After Opening 1 No-Trump (Acol) (2001)
- Understanding the Contested Auction (with Andrew Kambites) (2001)
- The Power of Shape (2002)
- Understanding Duplicate Pairs (with Andrew Kambites) (2002)
- Understanding the Uncontested Auction (with Andrew Kambites) (2002)
- When to Bid, When to Pass (2002)
- 20 Great Conventions Flipper (2002)
- Duplicate Bridge Flipper (2003)
- Understanding Slam Bidding (with Andrew Kambites) (2003)
- Bridge Is Fun (2004)
- Ron Klinger's Master Class (2004)
- 5-Card Major Stayman (Standard American) (2005)
- 5-Card Major Stayman (Acol) (2005)
- Memory-Aids and Useful Rules Flipper (2006)
- To Win at Bridge (2007)
- Right Through the Pack Again (2008) (winner, International Bridge Press Association Book of the Year)
- Improve Your Opening Leads (2009)
- Improve Your Declarer Play at No-Trumps (2009)
- Better Balanced Bidding (with David Jackson) (2010)
- Deadly Defence (with Wladyslaw Izdebski and Roman Krzemien) (2011)
- The Deadly Defence Quiz Book (with Wladyslaw Izdebski and Roman Krzemien) (2011)
- Improve Your Slam Bidding (2012)
- Improve Your Play at Trump Contracts (2012)
- A Good Game of Modern Bridge (2014)
- 50 Great Puzzles on Declarer Play (2019)
- 50 Great Puzzles on Defence (2019)
- The Power of Pass (Is Someone Holding a Gun to Your Head?) (2020)
