= Alan Truscott =

British bridge player and writer (1925–2005)

Alan Fraser Truscott (16 April 1925 – 4 September 2005) was a British-American bridge player, writer, and editor. He wrote the daily bridge column for The New York Times for 41 years, from 1964 to 2005, and served as Executive Editor for the first six editions of The Official Encyclopedia of Bridge from 1964 to 2002.

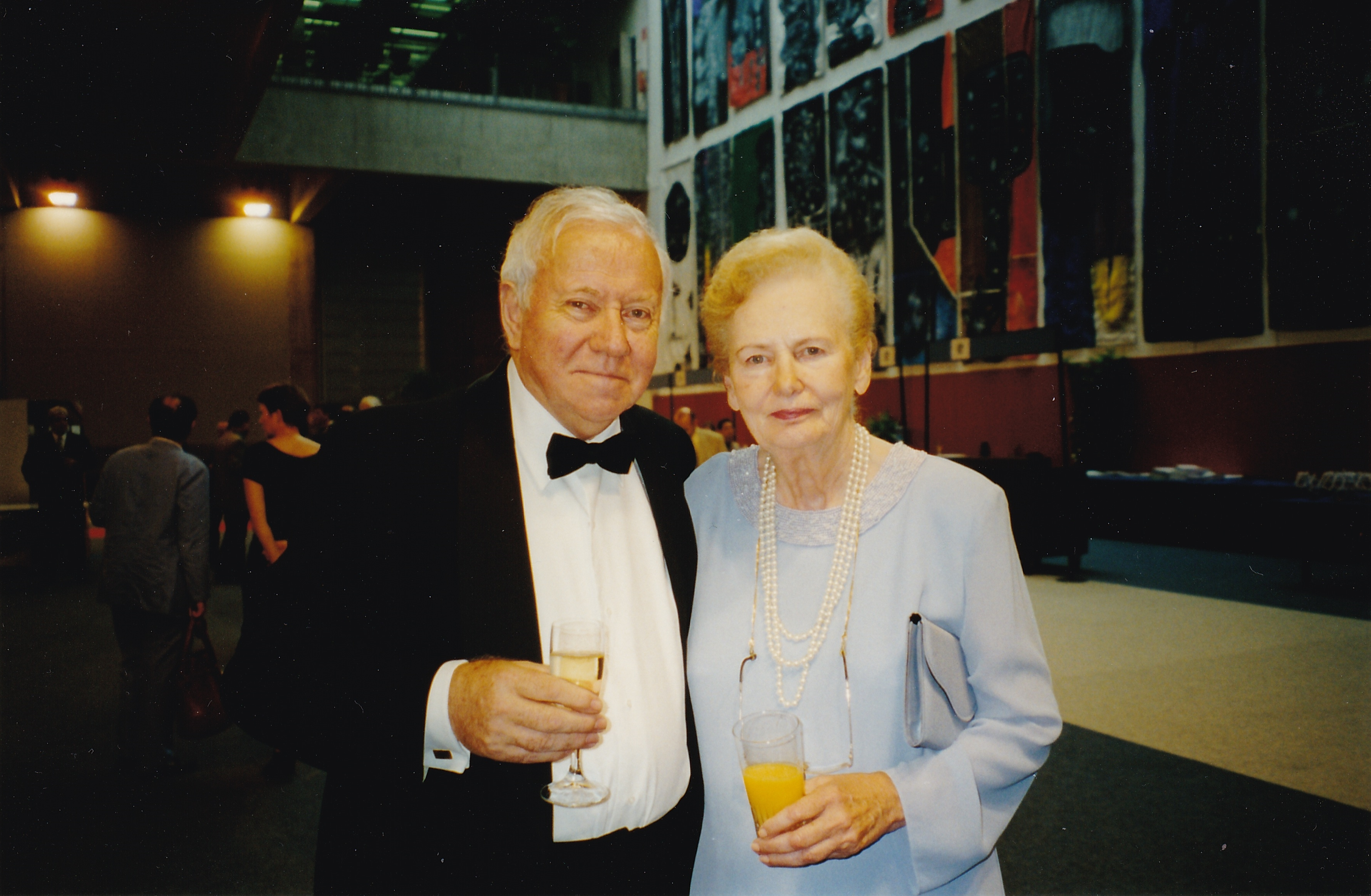
Alan and Dorothy Truscott (1998)

== Britain ==
Truscott was born in Brixton, south London, and showed early prowess at chess. He attended Whitgift School in Croydon and served in the Royal Navy for three years around the end of World War II. From 1947, Truscott studied at Oxford, which he represented at both chess and bridge. With Oxford partner Robert d'Unienville, he was on the British team (along with Terence Reese and Boris Schapiro) that won a bronze medal at the 1951 European Bridge League championships, age only 26. Truscott represented Britain in the same event twice more, finishing second with partner Maurice Harrison-Gray in 1958 (again along with Reese–Schapiro) and first with partner Tony Priday in 1961. He was in charge of organising the 1961 rendition hosted by Torquay in Devonshire, England. As European champions that British team finished third in the 1962 Bermuda Bowl held in New York City. The 1961 European Teams was Truscott's only international championship outside the British Isles.

== America ==
According to Maureen Hiron, bridge columnist for The Independent of London, in New York City "(Truscott) fell in love with one of the scorers, in particular, and America in general, and decided to cross the Atlantic."

Richard L. Frey, the American Contract Bridge League publications director, recruited Truscott to help edit the ACBL's membership magazine and its Official Encyclopedia of Bridge, whose first edition was underway. Truscott moved to New York City, then the ACBL headquarters, and succeeded Albert Morehead as bridge editor of The New York Times 1 January 1964. Truscott wrote a bridge column for The New York Times daily until March 1994, and then three times a week until April 2005, when he retired due to poor health, for a total of some 12,750 columns.

Frey, Truscott, and the editorial board led by Morehead completed the first edition of The Official Encyclopedia of Bridge in 1964. Truscott would be the executive editor of the encyclopedia until his death.

Alan Truscott had three children, Frances, Fraser and Philip, with his first wife, Gloria Gilling. That marriage was dissolved in 1971 and in 1972 he married the American bridge expert and internationalist Dorothy Hayden, née Johnson, a former math teacher and actuary, who had four children from two previous marriages.

Alan Truscott wrote thirteen bridge books, including two with his wife, Dorothy, and one with Phillip Alder. He died of cancer at their vacation home in New Russia, New York, near Lake Champlain. His widow died the following year.

== Buenos Aires affair ==
As New York Times correspondent, Truscott covered the 1965 contract bridge world championship Bermuda Bowl in Buenos Aires and became a chief witness in a cheating scandal where Terence Reese and Boris Schapiro, representing Europe, were accused of using their fingers to pass information about their cards. The initial accusers were the American partnership of B. Jay Becker and Dorothy Hayden; the two confided their suspicions to Truscott, a close friend of Hayden's (and later her husband), and to John Gerber, then captain of the USA team. After an investigation, Reese and Schapiro were judged guilty by the World Bridge Federation authorities at the tournament in Buenos Aires. The British Bridge League (BBL) convened its own inquiry, and next year judged them not guilty by the "reasonable doubt" standard.

Both Truscott and Reese published books on the affair, The Great Bridge Scandal and The Story of an Accusation.

== Bridge accomplishments ==
=== Honors ===
- ACBL Hall of Fame, Blackwood Award 2001

=== Winner ===
- North American Bridge Championships (3)
  - Mixed Pairs (1) 1989
  - Master Mixed Teams (1) 1985
  - North American Swiss Teams (1) 1987
- European Championships (1)
  - Open Teams (1) 1961
- British Championships (2)
  - Masters Individual (2) 1953, 1958

=== Runners-up ===
- North American Bridge Championships (2)
  - Master Mixed Teams (1) 1972
  - North American Swiss Teams (1) 1994
- European Championships (1)
  - Open Teams (1) 1958

== Publications ==
- The New York Times articles by Alan Truscott.
- Truscott, Alan (1987). Basic Bridge in Three Weeks. New York: Perigee. ISBN 9780399513770. 224 pp.
- Truscott, Alan (1996). The Bidding Dictionary. Oakland: Lawrence & Leong. 272 pp.
- Truscott, Alan (2004). Bridge in Three Weeks. Toronto: Master Point Press. 232 pp.
- Truscott, Alan (1968). Competitive Bidding. Bridge Tutor. New York: Roin. 32 pp.
- Truscott, Alan (1968). Defensive Bidding. Bridge Tutor. Roin. 32 pp.
- Truscott, Alan (1968). No Trump Bidding. Bridge Tutor. Roin. 32 pp.
- Truscott, Alan (1968). Slam Bidding. Bridge Tutor. Roin. 32 pp.
- Truscott, Alan (1968). Suit Bidding. Bridge Tutor. Roin. 32 pp.
- Truscott, Alan (1961). Bridge: Successful Play from First Principles. London: Oldbourne. 159 pp.
- Truscott, Alan (1959–2001). Contract Bridge. Various publishers. 99 to 133 pp.
- Truscott, Alan (1969). The Great Bridge Scandal. New York: Yarborough. 331 pp.
- Truscott, Alan (1970). Improve Your Bridge No. 3. New York: Doop Bridge Supplies. 26 pp.
- Truscott, Alan (1990). Intermediate Bridge in Three Weeks. New York: Perigee. ISBN 9780399516382. 224 pp.
- Truscott, Alan (1971–1979). Master Bridge by Question and Answer. Various publishers. 252 to 260 pp.
- Truscott, Alan (1987). The New York Times Bridge Series: Doubles and Redoubles. New York: Times Books. 152 pp.
- Truscott, Alan (1985). The New York Times Bridge Series: Grand Slams. Times Books. 133 pp.
- Truscott, Alan (1970). The New York Times Guide to Practical Bridge. New York: Golden Press. 220 pp.
- Truscott, Alan; Truscott, Dorothy (1976–77). Teach Yourself Basic Bidding. Arco Publishing Company. ISBN 9780668038362. (New York: Arco Pub. Co., 1996, ISBN 0668038365)
- Truscott, Alan; Truscott, Dorothy (2002). The New York Times Bridge Book: an anecdotal history of the development, personalities, and strategies of the world's most popular card game. New York: St. Martin's Press. ISBN 0-312-33107-X. ISBN 0-312-29090-X (paper).
- Rosenkranz, George; Truscott, Alan (1982). Modern Ideas in Bidding. Louisville, KY: Devyn Press. 236 pp.
- Rosenkranz, George; Truscott, Alan (1992). Bidding on Target. Devyn Press. 292 pp.
- Truscott, Alan; Morehead, Albert; Alder, Phillip (1990). On Bidding: Albert Morehead's Classic Work on the Principles of Bidding Judgement Revised and Updated. Simon & Schuster. ISBN 9780671664633. 399 pp.
