= World Junior Championships =

World Junior Championships (also Youth World Championship as opposed to Senior World Championship) may refer to:

- Artistic gymnastics: Artistic Gymnastics Junior World Championships
- Association football (soccer): FIFA World Youth Championship, now known as the FIFA U-20 World Cup (also U-17)
- Athletics: IAAF World Junior Championships in Athletics
- Badminton: BWF World Junior Championships, a tournament organized by the Badminton World Federation (BWF) to crown the best junior badminton players (under-19) in the world
- Bandy: Youth Bandy World Championship
  - Bandy World Championship Y-19
  - Bandy World Championship U-23
- Baseball: 18U Baseball World Cup (also 15U, 12U), the 18-and-under baseball world championship, International Baseball Federation, World Baseball Softball Confederation
- Basketball: FIBA Under-19 World Championship
- Boxing: AIBA Youth World Boxing Championships, a boxing championship event organised by the AIBA for "Youth" competitors who are between the age of 17–19 years old. It is biennially competition which began in 2008 in Guadalajara, Mexico
- Bridge: World Junior Teams Championship, a bridge competition for zonal teams of players up to about 25 years old
  - Pairs and individuals: World Junior Pairs Championship
- Chess: World Junior Chess Championship (U20), an under-20 chess tournament (players must have been under 20 years old on 1 January in the year of competition) organized by the World Chess Federation (FIDE)
  - World Youth Chess Championship (U18, U16, etc.), a chess competition for girls and boys under the age of 8, 10, 12, 14, 16 and 18. Twelve world champions are crowned every year
- IFSC Climbing World Youth Championships
- Curling: World Junior Curling Championships, an annual curling bonspiel featuring the world's best curlers who are 21 years old or younger
- Fencing: Junior World Fencing Championships (U20), an annual international fencing competition held by the International Fencing Federation for athletes up to 20 years old. They are organised at the same time and venue as the Cadet World Championships held for athletes up to 17 years old
- Figure skating: World Junior Figure Skating Championships
- Golf: Junior World Golf Championships, held in San Diego, California, United States each year, currently in July
- Hockey (field): Men's FIH Hockey Junior World Cup or Women's FIH Hockey Junior World Cup
- Hockey (ice): IIHF World Junior Championship; see also U18 men's and U18 women's
- Judo: World Judo Juniors Championships
- Lacrosse (box): World Junior Lacrosse Championship;
- Netball: World Youth Netball Championships, the world championships of netball for national U21 teams, with all players being aged 21 years or younger
- Orienteering: Junior World Orienteering Championships
  - Ski orienteering: Junior World Ski Orienteering Championships
- Rhythmic gymnastics: Rhythmic Gymnastics Junior World Championships
- Rowing: World Rowing Junior Championships, an international rowing regatta organized by FISA (the International Rowing Federation)
- Rugby (union): IRB Junior World Championship
- Skiing (alpine): World Junior Alpine Skiing Championships
- Skiing (Nordic): FIS Nordic Junior World Ski Championships
- Speed skating: World Junior Speed Skating Championships
  - Short track: World Junior Short Track Speed Skating Championships
- Squash: World Junior Squash Championships, the official junior tournament in the game of squash conducted by the World Squash Federation (WSF)
- Synchronized skating: ISU World Junior Synchronized Skating Championships
- Synchronized swimming: FINA World Junior Synchronised Swimming Championships
  - FINA Youth World Swimming Championships
- Table tennis: ITTF World Youth Championships
- Wrestling: World Junior Wrestling Championships, annual event in freestyle and Greco-Roman wrestling held by the United World Wrestling since 1968 for competitors 15–18 years old

== See also ==
- List of world cups and world championships for juniors and youth, sporting events which use one of these two names, or one with a similar meaning. Tournaments which are formally defunct or where a further event is not currently planned are marked with a gray background
