= List of world cups and world championships for juniors and youth =

The following is a list of world cups and world championships for juniors and youth, sporting events which use one of these two names, or a name with a similar meaning. Tournaments which are formally defunct or where a further event is not currently planned are marked with a gray background.

== Men ==
Sport	Competition name	Competing entities	Age groups	First held
Aikido	Aikido World Championships	Individuals		2017
Alpine skiing	World Junior Alpine Skiing Championships	Individuals		1982
Aquatics	World Aquatics Junior Swimming Championships	Individuals^{[R]}	17 or younger	2006
Aquatics	FINA World Junior Open Water Swimming Championships	Individuals	19 or younger	2012
Aquatics	World Aquatics Junior Diving Championships	Individuals^{[R]}		1977
Aquatics	World Aquatics U20 Water Polo Championships	Nations	20 or younger	1981
Aquatics	World Aquatics U18 Water Polo Championships	Nations	18 or younger	2012
Aquatics	World Aquatics U16 Water Polo Championships	Nations	16 or younger	2022
Archery	World Archery Youth Championships	Individuals and Nations		1991
Indoor archery	World Indoor Archery Championships	Individuals and Nations		2007
Athletics	IAAF World U20 Championships	Individuals^{[R]}	18–19	1986
Badminton	BWF World Junior Championships	Individuals^{[D]}	19 or younger	1992
Bandy	Bandy World Championship U-21	Nations	21 or younger	1990
Bandy	Bandy World Championship U-19	Nations	19 or younger	1968
Bandy	Bandy World Championship U-17	Nations	17 or younger	1975
Bandy	Bandy World Championship U-15	Nations	15 or younger	1994
Baseball	U-23 Baseball World Cup	Nations	23 or younger	2014
Baseball	U-18 Baseball World Cup	Nations	18 or younger	1981
Baseball	U-15 Baseball World Cup	Nations	15 or younger	1989
Baseball	U-12 Baseball World Cup	Nations	11–12	2011
Baseball	Senior League World Series	Communities	13–16	1961
Baseball	Junior League World Series	Communities	13–15	1981
Baseball	Intermediate League World Series	Communities	11–13	2013
Baseball	Little League World Series	Communities	11–13	1947
Baseball5	Youth Baseball5 World Cup	Nations		2023
Softball	U-23 Men's Softball World Cup	Nations	23 or younger	2023
Softball	U-18 Men's Softball World Cup	Nations	18 or younger	1981
Basketball	FIBA Under-19 Basketball World Cup	Nations	19 or younger	1979
Basketball	FIBA Under-17 Basketball World Cup	Nations	17 or younger	2010
Basketball	FIBA 3x3 U18 World Cup	Nations	18 or younger	2011
Basketball	FIBA 3x3 U23 World Cup	Nations	23 or younger	2018
Beach volleyball	FIVB Beach Volleyball U21 World Championships	Nations	21 or younger	2001
Beach volleyball	FIVB Beach Volleyball U19 World Championships	Nations	19 or younger	2002
Biathlon	Biathlon Junior World Championships	Individual and Nations		1967
Billiards	World Junior Nine-Ball Championships	Individual	19 or younger; 17 or younger	1991
Bobsleigh	World Junior Bobsleigh Championships	Individual		
Boxing	Youth and Junior World Boxing Championships	Individual		1979
Canoe polo	ICF Canoe Polo World Championships	Nations	21 or younger	2002
Canoeing	ICF World Junior and U23 Canoe Slalom Championships	Individual		1986
Canoeing	ICF World Junior and U23 Canoe Sprint Championships	Individual		
Cricket	U-19 Cricket World Cup	Nations	19 or younger	1988
Cross-country skiing	FIS Nordic Junior World Ski Championships	Individual		1977
Curling	World Junior Curling Championships	Nations		1975
Cycling	UCI Road World Championships	Individuals		1975
Cycling	UCI Cyclo-cross World Championships	Individuals		1979
Cycling	UCI Mountain Bike & Trials World Championships	Individuals		1990
Cycling	UCI Urban Cycling World Championships	Individuals		2017
Cycling	UCI Junior Track World Championships	Individuals		1975
Fencing	Junior World Fencing Championships	Individuals and Nations		1950
Field archery	World Field Archery Championships	Individuals		1986
Field hockey	Men's FIH Hockey Junior World Cup	Nations	21 or younger	1979
Inline hockey	FIRS Inline Hockey World Championships	Nations		2007
Roller Hockey	FIRS Roller Hockey World Cup U-20	Nations		1999
Figure skating	World Junior Figure Skating Championships	Individuals	13–19	1976
Finswimming	Finswimming World Championships	Individuals		1989
Fistball	World Under-18 Fistball Championships	Nations	18 or younger	2003
Football (soccer)	FIFA U-20 World Cup	Nations	20 or younger	1977
Football (soccer)	FIFA U-17 World Cup	Nations	17 or younger	1985
Floorball	Under-19 World Floorball Championships	Nations	19 or younger	2001
Freestyle skiing	FIS Freestyle Junior World Ski Championships	Individuals	15–18	2003
Miniature golf	World Youth Mini-Golf Championships	Individuals		2021
Golf	World Junior Golf Championship	Individuals	17 or younger	2015
Gymnastics	Junior World Gymnastics Championships	Individuals		1989
Artistic gymnastics	Artistic Gymnastics Junior World Championships	Individuals	17 or younger	2019
Handball	IHF Men's U21 Handball World Championship	Nations	21 or younger	1977
Handball	IHF Men's U19 Handball World Championship	Nations	19 or younger	2005
Beach handball	IHF Youth Beach Handball World Championship	Nations		2017
Ice Climbing	UIAA Ice Climbing World Youth Championships	Individuals	U16.U19.U22	2013
Ice hockey	IIHF World Junior Championship	Nations	20 or younger	1977
Ice hockey	IIHF World U18 Championship	Nations	18 or younger	1999
Indoor soccer	WMF U23 World Cup	Nations	U23	2018
Judo	World Judo Juniors Championships	Individuals		1974
Karate	World Cadet, Junior and U21 Karate Championships	Individuals		1996
Kickboxing	WAKO World Championships (Cadets and Juniors)	Individuals		1996
Lacrosse	Under-19 World Lacrosse Championships	Nations	19 or younger	1988
Luge	Junior World Luge Championships	Individuals		1985
Modern pentathlon	Modern Pentathlon Junior World Championships	Individuals		
Modern pentathlon	Modern Pentathlon Youth World Championships	Individuals		
Nine-pin bowling	World Youth Bowling Championships	Individuals		2014
Nine-pin bowling	World Senior Bowling Championships	Individuals		2013
Orienteering	Junior World Orienteering Championships	Individuals	20 and younger	1990
Racquetball	Junior Racquetball World Championships	Individuals		2006
Rowing	World Rowing Junior Championships	Nations	18 or younger	1967
Rowing	World Rowing U23 Championships	Individuals	23 or younger	2005
Rugby union	World Rugby Under 20 Championship	Nations	20 or younger	2008
Sambo	World Youth and Junior Sambo Championships	Individuals		
Short track speed skating	World Junior Short Track Speed Skating Championships	Individuals and Nations	19 or younger	1994
Skeleton	World Junior Skeleton Championships	Individual		
Ski jumping	FIS Nordic Junior World Ski Championships	Individual		1977
Snowboarding	FIS Snowboarding Junior World Championships	Individuals		1997
Speed skating	World Junior Speed Skating Championships	Individuals and Nations	19 or younger	1972
Speed skating	ISU Junior World Cup Speed Skating	Individuals and Nations	19 or younger	2008–09
Squash	World Junior Squash Championships	Individuals and Nations	19 or younger	1973
Sailing	ISAF Youth Sailing World Championships	Nations	Under 19's	1971
Sailing	420 World Championships	Individuals	U17 or younger	2015
Sailing	470 World Championships	Individuals		2016
Sailing	49er & 49er FX World Championships	Individuals		2011
Sailing	Laser 4.7 World Championships	Individuals	18 or younger	2002
Sailing	Laser Radial World Championships	Individuals	21 or younger	2009
Sport climbing	IFSC Climbing World Youth Championships	Individuals		1992
Shooting	ISSF Junior World Cup	Individual		2016
Ski orienteering	Junior World Ski Orienteering Championships	Individual		1994
Snooker	IBSF World Under-21 Snooker Championship	Individual	21 and younger	1987
Snooker	IBSF World Under-18 Snooker Championship	Individual	18 and younger	2015
Surfing	World Junior Surfing Championships	Individuals		
Table tennis	ITTF World Youth Championships	Individuals^{[D]} and Nations	19 or younger	2003
Taekwondo	World Taekwondo Junior Championships	Individuals	15–17	1996
Tennis	Junior Davis Cup and Junior Fed Cup	Nations		1985
Tug of war	TWIF Outdoor World Championships	Nations		1976
Volleyball	FIVB Volleyball Men's U21 World Championship	Nations	21 or younger	1977
Volleyball	FIVB Volleyball Boys' U19 World Championship	Nations	19 or younger	1989
Volleyball	FIVB Volleyball Boys' U17 World Championship	Nations	17 or younger	2024
Weightlifting	IWF Junior World Weightlifting Championships	Individuals		1975
Water skiing	IWWF World Junior Waterski Championships	Individuals		
Windsurfing	RS:X World Championships	Individuals		
Wrestling	Junior World Wrestling Championships	Individuals		1975
Wrestling	UWW U23 World Wrestling Championships	Individuals	Under 23	2021
Wushu	World Junior Wushu Championships	Individuals		2006
Gym wheel	Wheel Gymnastics World Championships	Individuals	18 or younger	1995

== Women ==
Sport	Competition name	Competing entities	Age groups	First held
Aikido	Aikido World Championships	Individuals		2017
Alpine skiing	World Junior Alpine Skiing Championships	Individuals		1982
Aquatics	FINA World Junior Swimming Championships	Individuals^{[R]}	17 or younger	2006
Aquatics	FINA World Junior Open Water Swimming Championships	Individuals	19 or younger	2012
Aquatics	World Aquatics Junior Diving Championships	Individuals^{[R]}		1977
Aquatics	FINA World Junior Synchronised Swimming Championships	Individuals and Nations		1989
Aquatics	World Aquatics U20 Water Polo Championships	Nations	20 or younger	1995
Aquatics	World Aquatics U18 Water Polo Championships	Nations	18 or younger	2012
Aquatics	World Aquatics U16 Water Polo Championships	Nations	16 or younger	2022
Athletics	IAAF World U20 Championships	Individuals^{[R]}	18–19	1986
Archery	World Archery Youth Championships	Individuals and Nations		1991
Indoor archery	World Indoor Archery Championships	Individuals and Nations		2007
Badminton	BWF World Junior Championships	Individuals^{[D]}	19 or younger	1992
Bandy	Bandy World Championship G-17	Nations	17 or younger	2009
Bandy	Under-17 Girl's World Cup	Nations	17 or younger	2020
Softball	WBSC U-18 Women's Softball World Cup	Nations	19 or younger	1981
Softball	WBSC U-15 Women's Softball World Cup	Nations	15 or younger	2021
Softball	Big League Softball World Series	Communities	14–18	1974
Softball	Senior League World Series	Communities	13–16	1976
Softball	Junior League World Series	Communities	12–14	1999
Softball	Little League Softball World Series	Communities	11–12	1974
Basketball	FIBA Under-19 Women's Basketball World Cup	Nations	19 or younger	1985
Basketball	FIBA Under-17 Women’s Basketball World Cup	Nations	17 or younger	2010
Basketball	FIBA 3x3 U18 World Cup	Nations	18 or younger	2011
Basketball	FIBA 3x3 U23 World Cup	Nations	23 or younger	2018
Beach volleyball	FIVB Beach Volleyball U21 World Championships	Nations	21 or younger	2001
Beach volleyball	FIVB Beach Volleyball U19 World Championships	Nations	19 or younger	2002
Biathlon	Biathlon Junior World Championships	Individual and Nations		1967
Billiards	World Junior Nine-Ball Championships	Individual		1991
Bobsleigh	World Junior Bobsleigh Championships	Individual		
Boxing	Youth and Junior World Boxing Championships	Individual		1979
Canoe polo	ICF Canoe Polo World Championships	Nations	21 or younger	2002
Canoeing	ICF World Junior and U23 Canoe Slalom Championships	Individual		1986
Canoeing	ICF World Junior and U23 Canoe Sprint Championships	Individual		
Cricket	Under-19 Women's T20 World Cup	Nations	19 or younger	2023
Cross-country skiing	FIS Nordic Junior World Ski Championships	Individual		1977
Curling	World Junior Curling Championships	Nations		1988
Cycling	UCI Road World Championships	Individuals		1975
Cycling	UCI Cyclo-cross World Championships	Individuals		1979
Cycling	UCI Mountain Bike & Trials World Championships	Individuals		1990
Cycling	UCI Urban Cycling World Championships	Individuals		2017
Cycling	UCI Junior Track World Championships	Individuals		1975
Fencing	Junior World Fencing Championships	Individuals and Nations		1950
Field archery	World Field Archery Championships	Individuals		1986
Field hockey	Women's FIH Hockey Junior World Cup	Nations	21 or younger	1989
Inline hockey	FIRS Inline Hockey World Championships	Nations		2007
Figure skating	World Junior Figure Skating Championships	Individuals	13–19	1976
Finswimming	Finswimming World Championships	Individuals		1989
Fistball	World Under-18 Fistball Championships	Nations	18 or younger	2006
Football (soccer)	FIFA U-20 Women's World Cup	Nations	20 or younger	2002
Football (soccer)	FIFA U-17 Women's World Cup	Nations	17 or younger	2008
Floorball	Under-19 World Floorball Championships	Nations	19 or younger	2004
Freestyle skiing	FIS Freestyle Junior World Ski Championships	Individuals	15–18	2003
Miniature golf	World Youth Mini-Golf Championships	Individuals		2021
Golf	World Junior Golf Championship	Individuals	17 or younger	2015
Gymnastics	Junior World Gymnastics Championships	Individuals		1999
Artistic gymnastics	Artistic Gymnastics Junior World Championships	Individuals	15 or younger	2019
Rhythmic gymnastics	Rhythmic Gymnastics Junior World Championships	Individuals	15 or younger	2019
Handball	IHF Women's U20 Handball World Championship	Nations	20 or younger	1977
Handball	IHF Women's U18 Handball World Championship	Nations	18 or younger	2006
Beach handball	IHF Youth Beach Handball World Championship	Nations		2017
Ice Climbing	UIAA Ice Climbing World Youth Championships	Individuals	U16.U19.U22	2013
Ice hockey	IIHF World Women's U18 Championships	Nations	18 or younger	2008
Judo	World Judo Juniors Championships	Individuals		1974
Karate	World Cadet, Junior and U21 Karate Championships	Individuals		1996
Kickboxing	WAKO World Championships (Cadets and Juniors)	Individuals		1996
Lacrosse	Under-19 World Lacrosse Championships	Nations	19 or younger	1995
Luge	Junior World Luge Championships	Individuals		1985
Modern pentathlon	Modern Pentathlon Junior World Championships	Individuals		
Modern pentathlon	Modern Pentathlon Youth World Championships	Individuals		
Netball	Netball World Youth Cup	Nations	21 or younger	1988
Nine-pin bowling	World Youth Bowling Championships	Individuals		2014
Nine-pin bowling	World Senior Bowling Championships	Individuals		2013
Orienteering	Junior World Orienteering Championships	Individuals	20 and younger	1990
Racquetball	Junior Racquetball World Championships	Individuals		2006
Rowing	World Rowing Junior Championships	Nations	18 or younger	1978
Rowing	World Rowing U23 Championships	Individuals	23 or younger	2005
Sailing	ISAF Youth Sailing World Championships	Nations	Under 19's	1971
Sailing	470 World Championships	Individuals		2016
Sailing	49er & 49er FX World Championships	Individuals		2014
Sailing	Laser 4.7 World Championships	Individuals	18 or younger	2002
Sailing	Laser Radial World Championships	Individuals	21 or younger	2009
Sambo	World Youth and Junior Sambo Championships	Individuals		
Sport climbing	IFSC Climbing World Youth Championships	Individuals		1992
Shooting	ISSF Junior World Cup	Individual		2016
Short track speed skating	World Junior Short Track Speed Skating Championships	Individuals and Nations	19 or younger	1994
Skeleton	World Junior Skeleton Championships	Individual		
Ski jumping	FIS Nordic Junior World Ski Championships	Individual		1977
Ski orienteering	Junior World Ski Orienteering Championships	Individual		1994
Snooker	IBSF World Under-21 Snooker Championship	Individual	21 and younger	1987
Snooker	IBSF World Under-18 Snooker Championship	Individual	18 and younger	2015
Snowboarding	FIS Snowboarding Junior World Championships	Individuals		1997
Speed skating	World Junior Speed Skating Championships	Individuals and Nations	19 or younger	1973
Speed skating	ISU Junior World Cup Speed Skating	Individuals and Nations	19 or younger	2008–09
Squash	World Junior Squash Championships	Individuals and Nations	19 or younger	1973
Surfing	World Junior Surfing Championships	Individuals		
Table tennis	ITTF World Youth Championships	Individuals^{[D]} and Nations	19 or younger	2003
Taekwondo	World Taekwondo Junior Championships	Individuals	15–17	1996
Tennis	Junior Davis Cup and Junior Fed Cup	Nations		1985
Tug of war	TWIF Outdoor World Championships	Nations		1976
Volleyball	FIVB Volleyball Women's U21 World Championship	Nations	21 or younger	1977
Volleyball	FIVB Volleyball Girls' U19 World Championship	Nations	19 or younger	1989
Volleyball	FIVB Volleyball Girls' U17 World Championship	Nations	17 or younger	2024
Water skiing	IWWF World Junior Waterski Championships	Individuals		
Windsurfing	RS:X World Championships	Individuals		
Weightlifting	IWF Junior World Weightlifting Championships	Individuals		1975
Wrestling	Junior World Wrestling Championships	Individuals		1975
Wrestling	UWW U23 World Wrestling Championships	Individuals	Under 23	2021
Wushu	World Junior Wushu Championships	Individuals		2006
Gym wheel	Wheel Gymnastics World Championships	Individuals	18 or younger	1995

== Open ==
Sport	Competition name	Competing entities	Age groups	First held
Gliding	Junior World Gliding Championships	Individuals	25 or younger	1999
Sailing	ISAF Youth Sailing World Championships	Nations	Under 19's	1971
Sailing	Classes World Championship	Held in the 420, Optimist, Topper, Laser 4.7 etc.	Various	
Rallying	Junior WRC			2001

== Mixed ==
Sport	Competition name	Competing entities	Age groups	First held
Archery	World Youth Archery Championships	Individuals and Nations		1991
Badminton	BWF World Junior Championships	Nations	19 or younger	1992
Figure skating	World Junior Figure Skating Championships	Two mixed team events (pairs and ice dancing)	13–19 (women); 13–21 (men)	1976
Petanque	Pétanque World Championships			1987
Softball	WBSC U-12 Softball World Cup	Nations	12 or younger	2019
Synchronized skating	ISU World Junior Synchronized Skating Championships			2013
Tug of war	TWIF Outdoor World Championships	Nations		1976

== See also ==
- World championship
- List of world sports championships
- List of world championships in mind sports
- World cup competition
- List of multi-sport events
- FISU World University Championships
- Bridge: World Junior Teams Championship
- Bridge: World Junior Pairs Championship
- Chess: World Junior Chess Championship

== Notes ==
R. ^R – One or more relay events, in which three or four competitors compete for their nation, are included for each sex.
D. ^D – Includes three Doubles events, one for men, one for women, and one for mixed doubles.
