= Joel Wooldridge =

American bridge player

Joel Powhatan Wooldridge (born July 19, 1979) is an American multi-national champion and world junior champion in contract bridge, as well as an expert foosball player. In 1990, Wooldridge surpassed Sam Hirschman's previous record for the youngest individual to achieve Life Master status with the American Contract Bridge League. He achieved this milestone at the age of 11 years, 4 months, and 13 days, breaking the previous record of 11 years, 9 months, and 5 days. Four years later, Joel's record was surpassed by Sam's brother, Dan. Wooldridge currently resides in New York City.

== Bridge accomplishments ==
=== Awards ===
- ACBL King of Bridge 1997
- WBF Youth Award 2003
- ACBL Player of the Year 2011

=== Wins ===
- World Junior Teams Championship (3) 2001, 2002, 2005
- North American Bridge Championships (16)
  - Keohane North American Swiss Teams (1) 2025
  - Nail Life Master Pairs (1) 2025
  - Baldwin NAP Flight A (1) 2022
  - Lebhar IMP Pairs (2) 1997, 2013
  - Fast Open Pairs (1) 2003
  - Chicago Mixed Board-a-Match (1) 2009
  - Grand National Teams Championship Flight (2) 2025
  - NABC+ Mixed Swiss Teams (1) 2022
  - Roth Open Swiss Teams (2) 2009, 2014
  - Silodor Open Pairs (1) 2011
  - Norman Kay Platinum Pairs (2) 2011, 2024
  - Von Zedtwitz Life Master Pairs (1) 2017
  - Wernher Open Pairs (1) 2017

=== Runners-up ===
- World Junior Teams Championship 1999
- World University Team Cup 2006
- North American Bridge Championships (11)
  - Spingold (1) 2005
  - Blue Ribbon Pairs (1) 2009
  - NABC+ Mixed Swiss Teams (1) 2024
  - North American Pairs Flight A (3) 2011, 2018, 2025
  - Bermuda Bowl (1) 2011
  - Chicago Mixed Board-a-Match (1) 2012
  - Grand National Teams Championship Flight (2) 2012, 2019
  - Norman Kay Platinum Pairs (1) 2016
