= Anshul Bhatt =

Indian bridge player (born 2008)

Anshul Bhatt (born October 2008) is a bridge player from Mumbai, India. He won three gold medals — in Pairs, Teams, and Overall Performance — at the 7th World Youth Transnational Bridge Championships held in Salsomaggiore Terme, Italy, in 2022.

== Early life and education ==
Bhatt was born in October 2008 in Mumbai, India. He studied at Bombay Scottish School and later joined Dhirubhai Ambani International School, Mumbai.

Bhatt was introduced to card games by his grandparents at the age of four. He later trained with Indian player Keyzad Anklesaria and Canadian coach Eric Kokish.

== Bridge career ==
Bhatt played his first tournament at the Indian Gymkhana in Mumbai in 2016.

At the 5th World Youth Bridge Championships in Lyon, France (2017), he was the youngest participant, carried the flag at the opening ceremony, and won the Joan Gerard Award for fair play and sportsmanship.

He competed in Opatija, Croatia (2019), and returned at the 7th World Youth Transnational Championships in Salsomaggiore Terme, Italy (2022). There, he won gold medals in the U-16 Pairs (with Canadian partner Darwin Li), in the Teams event as captain of Team Blitz (with Li, Albert Pedmanson, and Jasper Vahk), and also secured the Overall gold medal for best performance. Furthermore, Bhatt participated in the 9th World Youth Transnational Champions in Hefei, China (2026), winning the bronze medal in the U-31 Teams as a member of Team India, partnering with Sushari Sayantan and teaming with Shubham Acharya, Surajit Bar, Vidhya Patel, and Sagnik Roy.

In December 2022, Bhatt was named joint Personality of the Year by the International Bridge Press Association.

Bhatt has also competed in the HCL International Bridge Championship, one of the richest bridge tournaments globally.

In March 2023, Bill Gates, also a bridge enthusiast, met Bhatt in Mumbai and publicly praised him.

== Awards and honours ==
Bhatt received the Joan Gerard Award at the World Youth Bridge Championships in Lyon in 2017. He went on to win three gold medals at the World Youth Transnational Championships in Salsomaggiore in 2022. In the same year, he was named Personality of the Year by the International Bridge Press Association.
