= Ida Grönkvist =

Swedish bridge player

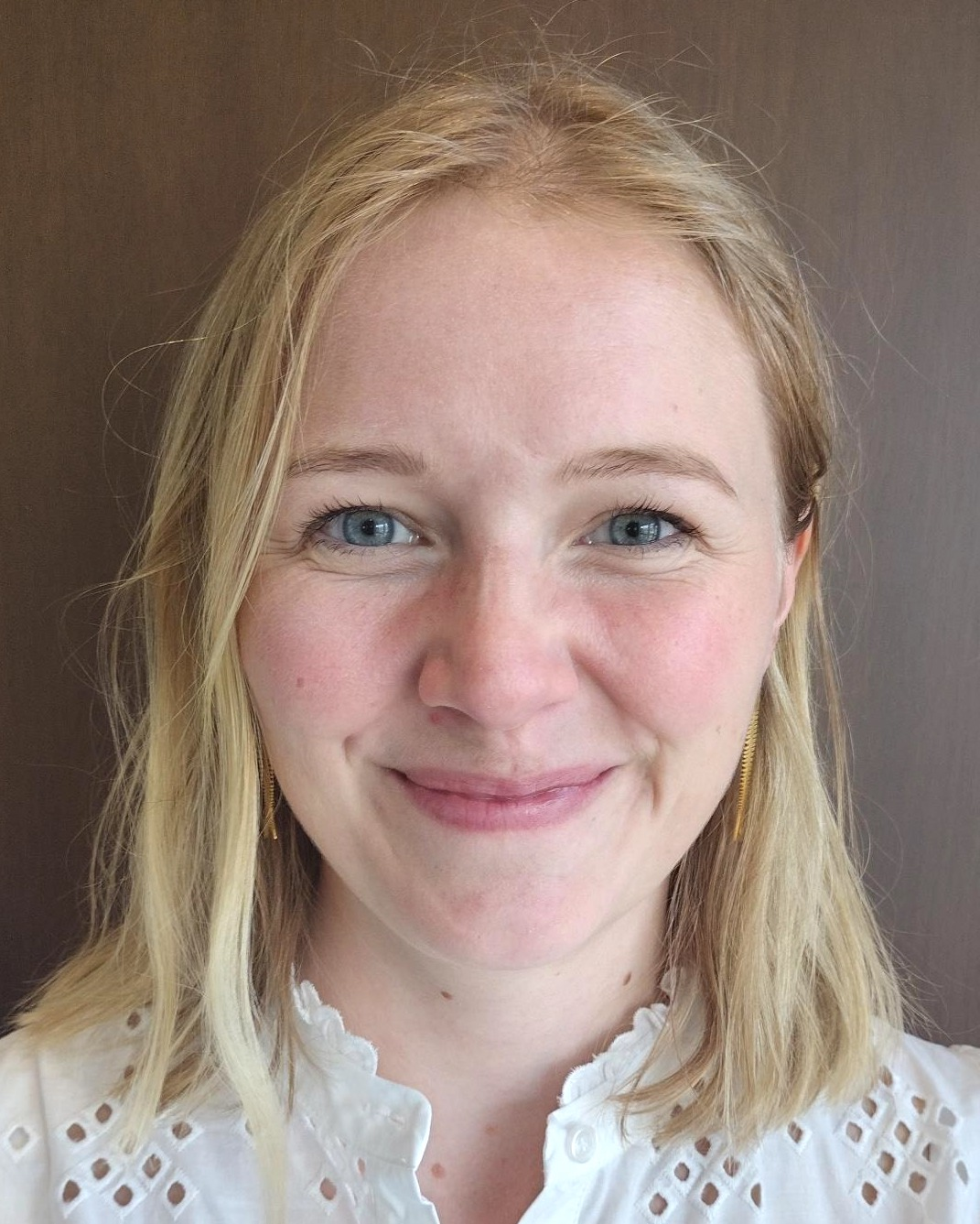
- Born: 1995 (age 30–31)

Ida Grönkvist is a Swedish world champion bridge player. Her brother Mikael is also a bridge player. Ida is a lawyer and lives in Stockholm.

== Bridge accomplishments ==
=== Wins ===
- Venice Cup (1) 2019
- World Junior Teams Championship Under 21 (1) 2014
- World Junior Teams Championship Under 26 (1) 2018
- North American Bridge Championships (2)
  - Machlin Women's Swiss Teams (1) 2016
  - NABC+ Mixed Swiss Teams (1) 2018

=== Runners-up ===
- Venice Cup (1) 2017
- North American Bridge Championships (2)
  - Machlin Women's Swiss Teams (1) 2017
  - Roth Open Swiss Teams (1) 2019
