= Barbara Ferm =

American bridge player

Barbara Ferm is an American World Champion bridge player. She won the Mixed Teams event in Wrocław in 2022.

== Bridge accomplishments ==
=== Wins ===
- World Bridge Series Mixed Teams (1) 2022

=== Runners-up ===
- North American Bridge Championships (1)
  - Machlin Women's Swiss Teams (1) 2015
