= Berry Westra =

Dutch bridge professional (born 1961)

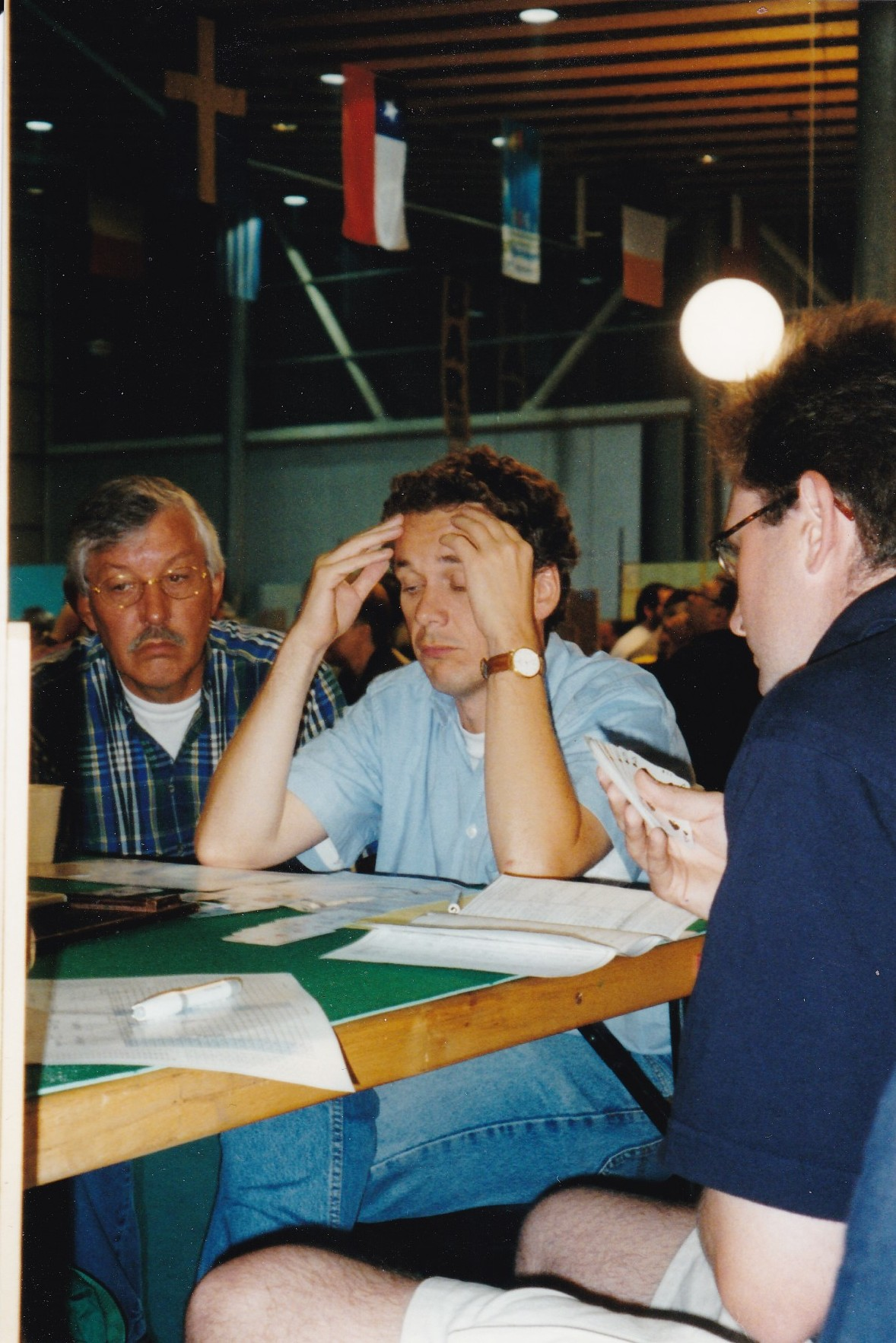
Berry Westra

Berry Westra (born February 28, 1961) is a Dutch bridge professional. At age 18 he made his debut with former bridge world champion Hans Kreijns in the meesterklasse (the highest competitive level in the Dutch bridge league). In 1986 Westra became European champion youth bridge. The world championship in the same category followed a year later. As member of the Dutch national team, he ended third at the World Team Olympiad in 1992 as well as in the European Teams Championship of 1995. In 1993 he won the Bermuda Bowl, the World Championship Open Teams. In 2007 Westra won a bronze medal at the European Team Championships in Antalya.

Apart from playing bridge at national and international levels, Westra also wrote many bridge books.

Westra was born in Amstelveen, North Holland, and he lives in Krimpen aan den IJssel.
