= Judy Bramley =

American bridge player

Judy Bramley (died 2022) was an American bridge player. She won three National titles playing as Judy Wadas. Judy was married to Bart Bramley.

== Bridge accomplishments ==
=== Wins ===
- North American Bridge Championships (3)
  - Machlin Women's Swiss Teams (2) 1997, 2000
  - Wagar Women's Knockout Teams (1) 1996

=== Runners-up ===
- North American Bridge Championships (3)
  - Machlin Women's Swiss Teams (1) 1988
  - Sternberg Women's Board-a-Match Teams (1) 2000
  - Rockwell Mixed Pairs (1) 1981
