= Machlin Women's Swiss Teams =

North American bridge championship

The Machlin Women's Swiss Teams North American bridge championship is held at the spring American Contract Bridge League (ACBL) North American Bridge Championship (NABC).

The Machlin Women's Swiss Teams is a four-session Swiss Teams event with two qualifying and two final sessions. The event typically starts on the second Saturday of the NABC. The event is only open to female players.

The event was dropped from the ACBL calendar effective 2018 and replaced with a two-day pairs event.

== History ==
The Machlin Women's Swiss Teams competition is a two-day event with two qualifying sessions, followed by two final sessions. Scoring is by International Match Points (IMPs) converted to Victory Points (VPs). The event began in 1982 and was originally named the North American Women's Swiss Teams.

The winners are awarded the Machlin Trophy, donated by the Machlin family in memory of Sadie Machlin, longtime ACBL employee. She was the sister of ACBL chief tournament director Al Sobel and the mother of Jerry Machlin, national tournament director.

== Winners ==
No Women's Swiss champion team has defended its title successfully and it has not been common for pairs or single players to win consecutively.

[North American] Women's Swiss Teams, 1982 to present
Year	Winners	Runners-up
1982	Dorothy Truscott, Stasha Cohen, Edith Kemp Freilich, Nancy Gruver, Mary Jane Farell, Randi Montin; Mike Smolen (npc)	JoAnn Manfield, Nadine Wood, Marilyn Eber, Bonnie Smith; Jan Janitschke (npc)
1983	Kathie Wei, Judi Radin, Gail Moss, Jacqui Mitchell, Betty Ann Kennedy, Carol Sanders	Dianna Gordon, Brenda Keller, Mary Albert, Sandra Fraser, Linda Peterson, Kerri Shuman
1984	June Deutsch, Tobi Deutsch, Cheri Bjerkan, Margie Gwozdzinsky, Dorothy Truscott, Sue Halperin	Karen McCallum, Ellee Lewis, Vivian Whalen, Kitty Bethe
1985	Sue Farino, Dianna Gordon, June Deutsch, Tobi Deutsch, Rhoda Walsh	2-3. Kathie Wei, Jacqui Mitchell, Judi Radin, Gail Greenberg, Carol Sanders, Betty Ann Kennedy; 2-3. Jo Morse, Cindy Bernstein, Joyce Lilie, Evelyn Levitt, Sally Wheeler, Florine Kuehl
1986	Jan Martel, Rozanne Pollack, Lynne Pollenz, Lynne Feldman, Roberta Epstein, Sue Picus	Sally Woolsey, Linda Peterson, Carol Pincus, Ann Jacobson, Nell Cahn, Kitty Podolsky
1987	Cheri Bjerkan, Juanita Chambers, Lynn Deas, Beth Palmer	Helen Utegaard, Helene Gingiss, Rhoda Walsh, Jill Meyers, Beverly Rosenberg
1988	Helen Utegaard, Rhoda Walsh, Carol Pincus, Beverly Rosenberg	2-3. Judy Wadas, Sandra Fraser, Janice Seamon, Renee Mancuso; 2-3. Tobi Deutsch, Betsey Wolff, Nancy Alpaugh, Kay Schulle
1989	Kerri Shuman, Kitty Bethe, Margie Gwozdzinsky, Karen McCallum	Jean Michell, Patti Hartley, Shirley Blum, Janet Robertson
After 1989 "North American" was dropped from the official name of the competition.
1990	Kerri Shuman, Karen McCallum, Edith Rosenkranz, Sabine Zenkel, Daniela von Arnim	Nell Cahn, Sharon Osberg, Sue Picus, Nancy Passell
1991	1–2. Jacqui Mitchell, Joyce Lilie, Amalya Kearse, Jo Morse; 1-2. Cheri Bjerkan, Juanita Chambers, Jill Meyers, Randi Montin, Kay Schulle, Pam Wittes, Ron Andersen (npc)	
1992	Gail Greenberg, Judy Tucker, Dorothy Truscott, Lisa Berkowitz, Sandra Landy, Michele Handley	Renee Mancuso, Brenda Keller, Joan Jackson, Petra Hamman, Judi Cody, Ellasue Chaitt
1993	Kay Schulle, Jill Meyers, Kerri Shuman, Karen McCallum	Jean Anderson, Janet Daling, Sharon Colson, Broma Lou Reed
1994	Juanita Chambers, Rhoda Kratenstein, Shawn Womack, Jan Cohen, Hjördis Eythorsdottir	Karen McCallum, Kitty Munson, Carol Simon, Sue Picus
1995	Kathie Wei-Sender, Carol Sanders, Betty Ann Kennedy, Sue Sachs, Lynn Deas, Beth Palmer	Marinesa Letizia, Kay Schulle, Jill Meyers, Randi Montin, Dorothy Truscott, Tobi Deutsch
1996	Kathie Wei-Sender, Sue Sachs, Beth Palmer, Lynn Deas, Juanita Chambers	Sally Woolsey, JoAnne Casen, Jan Martel, Georgiana Gates
1997	Pam Wittes, Shawn Quinn, Cheri Bjerkan, Sue Weinstein, Stasha Cohen, Judy Wadas	Judi Radin, Sylvia Moss, Valerie Westheimer, Connie Goldberg
1998	Jo Morse, Karen McCallum, Rose Johnson-Meltzer, Hjördis Eythorsdottir, Lynn Baker	Susan Miller, Barbara Sion, Joyce Lilie, Suzy Burger
1999	Robin Klar, Joan Jackson, Petra Hamman, Peggy Sutherlin, Shawn Quinn, Mildred Breed	Lynn Baker, Tobi Sokolow, Janice Seamon-Molson, Jill Meyers, Randi Montin, Karen McCallum
2000	Hjördis Eythorsdottir, Valerie Westheimer, Judy Wadas, Linda Lewis, Karen Barrett	Kathie Wei-Sender, Juanita Chambers, Betty Ann Kennedy, Jill Levin, Janice Seamon-Molson, Tobi Sokolow
2001	Lynn Baker, Irina Levitina, Karen McCallum, Jill Meyers, Randi Montin, Kerri Sanborn; John Mohan (npc)	Lynne Tarnopol, Laurie Vogel, Gail Greenberg, Amalya Kearse, Jacqui Mitchell
2002	Kathie Wei-Sender, Betty Ann Kennedy, Janice Seamon-Molson, Tobi Sokolow, Jill Levin, Sue Picus	Sally Wheeler, Georgiana Gates, Peggy Sutherlin, Karen Allison
2003	Valerie Westheimer, Judi Radin, Mildred Breed, Shawn Quinn	Carlyn Steiner, Marinesa Letizia, Tobi Sokolow, Janice Seamon-Molson, Jill Meyers, Randi Montin
2004	JoAnn Sprung, Kathleen Sulgrove, Peggy Sutherlin, Karen Allison	Valerie Westheimer, Judi Radin, Mildred Breed, Shawn Quinn, Cheri Bjerkan, Stasha Cohen
2005	Hansa Narasimhan, JoAnna Stansby, Debbie Rosenberg, Irina Levitina, Sue Picus, Jill Levin	JoAnn Sprung, Renee Mancuso, Pam Wittes, Kathleen Sulgrove, Peggy Sutherlin, Karen Allison
2006	Mildred Breed, Pamela Granovetter, Sylvia Moss, Judi Radin, Shawn Quinn, Migry Zur Campanile	Laurie Kranyak, Linda McGarry, Linda Perlman, Kathleen Sulgrove
2007	Lynn Deas, Beth Palmer, Lynn Baker, Karen McCallum, Irina Levitina, Kerri Sanborn	Cynthia Balderson, Carole Miner, Peggy Kaplan, Melody Bi
2008	Cheri Bjerkan, Joann Glasson, Lisa Berkowitz, Sue Weinstein	Lynn Baker, Karen McCallum, Beth Palmer, Lynn Deas, Irina Levitina, Kerri Sanborn
2009	Phyllis Fireman, Shannon Cappelletti, Janice Seamon-Molson, Jill Meyers, Jill Levin, Tobi Sokolow	Ru Yan, Yong Ling Dong, Ming Sun, Wang Wenfei, Yi Qian Liu, Wang Hongli
2010	Shannon Cappelletti, Phyllis Fireman, Shawn Quinn, Wietske Van Zwol, Martine Verbeek, Migry Zur Campanile	Catherine D'Ovidio, Disa Eythorsdottir, Daniele Gaviard, Victoria Gromova, Stacy Jacobs, Tatiana Ponomareva
2011	Geeske Joel, Jill Levin, Jill Meyers, Debbie Rosenberg, Janice Seamon-Molson, Tobi Sokolow	Sabine Auken, Bénédicte Cronier, Joyce Hampton, Daniela von Arnim, Sylvie Willard, Jenny Wolpert
2012	Lynn Deas, Irina Levitina, Beth Palmer, Judi Radin, Kerri Sanborn, Barbara Sonsini	Mildred Breed, Disa Eythorsdottir, Shawn Quinn, Valerie Westheimer
2013	Laura Dekkers, Joann Glasson, Marion Michielsen, Sylvia Moss, Cecilia Rimstedt, Meike Wortel	Lynn Deas, Irina Levitina, Beth Palmer, Judi Radin, Kerri Sanborn, Barbara Sonsini
2014	Ling Gan, Wen Hu, Yan Huang, Li Lisuan, Yiting Ling, Wang Yanhong	Wang Hongli, Ran Jingrong, Qi Shen, Wang Wenfei, Lihua Zhou
2015	Lynn Baker, Karen McCallum, Pamela Granovetter, JoAnna Stansby, Irina Levitina, Kerri Sanborn	Wenfei Wang, Shen Qi, Ran Jingrong, Gan Ling, Jian Wang
2016	Sally Meckstroth, Cecilia Rimstedt, Ida Grönkvist, Marion Michielsen, Meike Wortel	Barbara Ferm, Juanita Chambers, Jill Meyers, Judi Radin, Jill Levin, Migry Zur Campanile
2017	Li Yiting, Wei Wang, Shuoyan Liu, Mei Xia	Loretta Rivers, Nina Taselaar, Cecilia Rimstedt, Ida Grönkvist, Sandra Rimstedt
2018	Dropped from ACBL calendar.	

== Sources ==
- List of previous winners, Page 5. Daily Bulletin (PDF), vol. 52–9, March 21, 2009, archived from the original (PDF) on November 17, 2010
- 2009 winners, Page 1. Daily Bulletin (PDF), vol. 52–11, March 23, 2009
- "Search Results: Machlin Women's Swiss Teams". 1982 to present. ACBL. Visit "NABC Winners"; select a Spring NABC. Retrieved 2014-06-04.
