= 2011 Aikido World Championships =

- Venue: Brunel University
- Location: London, United Kingdom
- Start date: 11 August
- End date: 14 August
- Competitors: 270 from 12 nations

The 2011 Aikido World Championships was held at the Brunel University in London, United Kingdom from 11 to 14 August.

== Medal summary ==
=== Mixed events ===
Event	Gold	Silver	Bronze
Kyu Grade; Junanahon Kata	Daniel White (GBR) ^{Tori} Charlotte Jenner (GBR) ^{Uke}	Vasiliy Titov (RUS) ^{Tori} Andrei Vendin (RUS) ^{Uke}	Elena Moreira (ESP) ^{Tori} Jorge Rodriguez (ESP) ^{Uke}
Dan Grade; Tanto Junanahon Kata	Kentaro Sugano (JPN) ^{Tori} Kojiro Tomikura (JPN) ^{Uke}	Miki Kawamura (JPN) ^{Tori} Yuki Takaya (JPN) ^{Uke}	James Bird (GRB) ^{Tori} Daniel Ramsden (GBR) ^{Uke}
Dan Grade; Koryu Goshin no Kata	Mick Pratt (GBR) ^{Tori} Paul Carr (GBR) ^{Uke}	Frederic Gomez (SUI) ^{Tori} Sebastien Peretti (SUI) ^{Uke}	Ayaka Nakashima (JPN) ^{Tori} Mao Matsumura (JPN) ^{Uke}
Dan Grade; Open / Freestyle Kata	Mick Pratt (GBR) ^{Tori} Paul Carr (GBR) ^{Uke}	Danielle Jones (GBR) ^{Tori} Simon Jones (GBR) ^{Uke}	Ryuta Kudo (JPN) ^{Tori} Mayumi Kainami (JPN) ^{Uke}
Dan Grade; Kongodantaisen	United Kingdom; Martin Hall-May; Gareth Bottomley; Mick Pratt; Paul Carr; Laura Beardsmore; Jermaine Liburd; James Bird	Japan; Keiko Konaka; Yuka Kimura; Ryuta Kudo; Mayumi Kainami; Rimi Adachi; Yuki Motosaka; Mikihisa Hirai	Russia; Ilya Solonitsyn; Elena Tkacheva; Aleksey Karashevskiy; Vadim Tikhonov; Irina Krivopushkova; Andrey Brezhnev; Yury Glushchenko

=== Men's events ===
Event	Gold	Silver	Bronze
Men's Individual Tanto Randori (Openweight)	Josh Ramey (USA)	Jermaine Liburd (GBR)	Daniel Ramsden (GBR)
Men's Team Tanto Randori (Openweight)	United Kingdom; James Bird; Daniel Ramsden; Jermaine Liburd; Paul Carr; Lee Mazacs	Japan; Satoshi Yasuda; Yuki Motosaka; Keisuke Mogi; Shunsuke Nakamura; Mikihisa Hirai	Japan; Kentaro Sugano; Kojiri Tomikura; Yuma Araki; Takayuki Gemba; Saotshi Izuhira

=== Women's events ===
Event	Gold	Silver	Bronze
Women's Team Tanto Randori (Openweight)	Laura Beardsmore (GBR)	Gitte Wolput (BEL)	Keiko Konaka (JPN)
Women's Team Tanto Randori (Openweight)	Japan; Yuka Kimura; Mayumi Kainami; Keiko Konaka	Japan; Mizuki Ogawa; Ayaka Nakashima; Rimi Adachi	United Kingdom; Danielle Jones; Laura Beardsmore; Sarah Fletcher

=== Medal table ===
Rank	Nation	Gold	Silver	Bronze	Total
1	Great Britain	6	2	3	11
2	Japan	2	4	4	10
3	United States	1	0	0	1
4	Russia	0	1	1	2
5	Belgium	0	1	0	1
5	Switzerland	0	1	0	1
7	Spain	0	0	1	1
Totals (7 entries)		9	9	9	27

== Participating nations ==
270 competitors from 12 nations compete.

- Australia (1)
- Belgium (7)
- Brazil (1)
- Canada (1)
- France (3)
- Japan (31)
- Netherlands (3)
- Russia (26)
- Spain (15)
- Switzerland (13)
- United Kingdom (159)
- United States (10)
