= ACBL Youngest Life Master =

Contract bridge title

The ACBL Youngest Life Master is a record set by the youngest person to achieve the American Contract Bridge League (ACBL) rank of Life Master. The requirements of this rank have been raised several times.

== Records ==
ACBL Youngest Life Master
Year	Record Setter	Age
1939	John Crawford	23 years
1952	Richard Freeman	18 years 10 months 7 days
1961	Dianne Barton-Paine	18 years 12 days
1965	Kyle Larsen	15 years 11 months
1968	Joseph Livezey	15 years 5 months
1973	Bobby Levin	15 years 4 months
1975	Michael Freed	15 years 20 days
1976	Regina Barnes	14 years 11 months
1977	Steve Cochran	14 years 5 months 20 days
1980	Billy Hsieh	13 years 7 months 15 days
1981 (June)	Andrew Kaufman	13 years 4 months 15 days
1981 (September)	Doug Hsieh	11 years 10 months 4 days
1988	Sam Hirschman	11 years 9 months 5 days
1990	Joel Wooldridge	11 years 4 months 13 days
1994	Dan Hirschman	10 years 2 months 20 days
2006	Adam Kaplan	10 years 43 days
2009	Richard Jeng	9 years 6 months 12 days
2012	Zach Garrison	9 years 2 months 7 days
2020	Andrew Chen	8 years 3 days

ACBL Female Youngest Life Master
Year	Record Setter	Age
1961	Dianne Barton-Paine	18 years 12 days
1973	Connie McGinley	17 years 5 months
1976	Regina Barnes	14 years 11 months
1982	Adair Gellman	14 years 6 months 4 days
1982 (12 days later)	Tricia Thomas	14 years 26 days
1999	Meredith Beck	13 years 6 months 11 days
