= Aikido World Championships =

Japanese martial art tournament

The Aikido World Championships is a tournament organized by the style of Tomiki Aikido or Shodokan Aikido following the wishes of its founder Tomiki Kenji. Although, the competition itself is open for all practitioners regardless of style, competitors are predominantly Tomiki Aikido or Shodokan members. Events are split into Embu (Kata) and Randori, as well as team events, with some events being specific to Kyu or Dan grades. The competition is held in a different location every two years. The most recent events include Tokyo in 2005; Ohio in 2007; Kyoto in 2009; London in 2011, and Osaka for SAF members and Kawasaki City for (JAA) members in 2013.

== Locations ==
No	Year	Host city, Country
1	1989	Tenri, Japan
	1991	Cardiff, United Kingdom
2	1993	Katsuura, Japan
	1995	Vandalia, United States
3	1997	Imabari, Japan
	1999	Brisbane, Australia
4	2001	Osaka, Japan
5	2003	Leeds, United Kingdom
6	2005	Katsuura, Japan
7	2007	Vandalia, United States
8	2009	Kyoto, Japan
9	2011	London, United Kingdom
	2013	Kawasaki City, Japan and Osaka, Japan
	2015	Fiesch, Switzerland and Gold Coast, Australia
	2017	Akita, Japan and London, United Kingdom
	2019	Málaga, Spain and (United States) San Diego
	2023	Tenri, Japan

== Current Events ==
For the 2013 Aikido World Championships, there are 8 different events. These include Embu, Randori and Team Events: SFA and JAA

Type	Grade	Event	Additional Info
Embu	Kyu	Basic Randori No Kata	Performed open hand, without tanto
Embu	Dan	Basic Randori No Kata	Performed with tanto
Embu	Dan	Koryu Goshin no Kata	Suwari waza and Tachi waza, 16 techniques
Embu	Dan	Freestyle/Open Kata	Must be performed without weapons, and with a 2-minute time limit
Randori	Open	Men's Individual Randori	
Randori	Open	Women's Individual Randori	
Randori	Open	Men's Team Randori	Teams consist of three male competitors
Randori	Open	Women's Team Randori	Teams consist of three female competitors

=== Previous Events ===
In tournaments prior to and including the 2013 Aikido World Championships, a mixed event called the Kongodanteisen took place. This consisted of 5 events: Koryu Goshin no kata suwari waza; Koryu Goshin no kata tachi waza; Women's Tanto Taisabaki; Men's Toshu Randori; Men's Tanto Randori. This was introduced at the 2001 Maishima Tournament.
