= WBF Youth Award =

Bridge youth awards

The Joan Gerard Youth Awards were established in 1989 by the World Bridge Federation to celebrate the sportsmanship of competitive youth contract bridge players. They were originally called the WBF Youth Award and were awarded biennially to four competitive bridge players under the age of 26. From 1995 to 2006, this coincided with the World Junior Camp. They were discontinued in 2007 at the same time as the discontinuation of the camps but reinstated in 2013 in a new form, being awarded annually at the Youth Bridge Teams Championships to a Junior, a Youngster, a Girl, and starting in 2015, a Kid. After the death of Joan Gerard, they were renamed in her memory.
