= World Junior Pairs Championship =

Bridge competition organized by the World Bridge Federation

The World Junior Pairs Championship is a bridge competition organized by the World Bridge Federation. It was inaugurated 1995 in Ghent, Belgium, when it incorporated the European Junior Pairs Championship inaugurated 1991. Officially the Juniors and Youngsters Pairs Championships (jointly, Youth Pairs) are biennial in odd years, although there are parallel contests in some even years.

Junior Pairs is open to players who are "under 26" years old at the end of the calendar year (u-26, U26). So they may celebrate their 25th birthdays during the year; Junior competition during calendar 2011 is restricted to players born 1986 and later. The parallel Youngsters Pairs is for players under 21 (u-21, U21). (Note: Most world championship tournaments are played during summer and fall seasons. Thus more than half but not all players are eligible to compete as Juniors once after their 25th birthdays, as Youngsters once after their 20th birthdays. The European Bridge League demarcations are u-26 (Junior) and u-21 (Youngster, formerly Schools), and u-26 for women (Young Ladies). It appears that the WBF plans to use the same restrictions universally after the first World Bridge Games (2008), where the age limit was 28.)

The next rendition in Opatija, Croatia, concludes 30 August 2011.

The 2011 Junior Pairs is a three-day matchpoints tournament with 61 entries. Only five are transnational.

Although the Junior Pairs is the long-running event at the Youth Congress, it takes second place to teams tournament, with a big step back from 2009 to 2011. The first rendition scheduled five-day teams followed by four-day pairs, Saturday to Sunday in all. The second scheduled five-day main event for teams, followed by one day to conclude the consolation event for teams (all that Monday to Saturday), and three-day pairs, Sunday to Tuesday.

== Scope ==
The Junior Pairs event (or tournament in a narrow sense) became part of the plural "World Youth Pairs Championships" in 2003 when a tournament for under-21 Youngster Pairs was initiated, pending sufficient entries by eligible players. Officially, that meet was discontinued and its two main events became part of the "World Youth Congress" in 2009, when teams events were added to the youth program for odd-number years, contested immediately prior to the older events for pairs.

Odd-year teams events are distinct from the older series of teams championships (now biennial in even years) and even-year pairs events are distinct from the older series of pairs championships (now biennial in odd years). Some conditions differ.

This article covers all "world championships" for youth pairs or individuals while World Junior Teams Championship covers all "world championships" for youth teams.

== Results ==
List "to date"

The World Bridge Federation calls the World Youth Congress—biennial in odd years, getting underway in 2009 and 2011— "the generalization of the World Youth Pairs Championships, inaugurated in Ghent, Belgium in 1995"—referring to the 'Juniors Pairs' which expanded to plural 'Youth' championships with Juniors and Youngsters flights in 2006.

The Youngsters event is sometimes called "Schools", as it was called in Europe. In fact a Schools championship was officially part of the 2003 Junior Pairs: the Schools medalists were the first three eligible pairs in the unified field.

Current definitions of u-26 and u-21 players may have evolved during the history of the WBF youth program but such details are not covered here. (The previous reference calls the Schools "up to 20" which suggests a difference.)

=== Juniors ===
The first official world champions, Geir Helgemo and Boye Brogeland of Norway, were the most successful in Open play through 2011. Helgemo had already played on Norway's second-place open team in 1993, and both would play in the Bermuda Bowls 1997 to 2007, as Norway placed third, fourth, second, fourth, out of the money, and finally first.

For the first rendition as a WBF event, European pairs held the first 44 places, except only one France—Guadeloupe pair in 25th place.

Year, Site, Entries		Medalists	
1995 Ghent, Belgium 154 pairs	1.	(Norway) Boye Brogeland	(Norway) Geir Helgemo
1995 Ghent, Belgium 154 pairs	2.	(Norway) Thomas Charlsen	(Norway) Espen Erichsen
1995 Ghent, Belgium 154 pairs	3.	(Denmark) Mik Kristensen	(Denmark) Morten Lund Madsen
1997 Santa Sofia, Italy 156 pairs	1.	(Sweden) Stefan Solbrand	(Sweden) Olle Wademark
1997 Santa Sofia, Italy 156 pairs	2.	(Denmark) Mette Drøgemüller	(Germany) Sebastian Reim
1997 Santa Sofia, Italy 156 pairs	3.	(Norway) Boye Brogeland	(Norway) Trond Hantveit
1999 Nymburk, Czech Republic 186 pairs	1.	(Austria) Andreas Gloyer	(Austria) Bernd Saurer
1999 Nymburk, Czech Republic 186 pairs	2.	(France) Félicien Daux	(France) Julien Geitner
1999 Nymburk, Czech Republic 186 pairs	3.	(Italy) Bernardo Biondo	(Italy) Francesco Mazzadi
2001 Stargard, Poland 220 pairs	1.	(Austria) Andreas Gloyer	(Austria) Martin Schifko
2001 Stargard, Poland 220 pairs	2.	(Netherlands) Sjoert Brink	(Netherlands) Bas Drijver
2001 Stargard, Poland 220 pairs	3.	(Italy) Fabio Lo Presti	(Italy) Francesco Mazzadi
2003 Tata, Hungary 189 pairs*	1.	(Israel) Adi Azizi	(Israel) Yuval Yener
2003 Tata, Hungary 189 pairs*	2.	(France) Guillaume Grenthe	(France) Jérôme Grenthe
2003 Tata, Hungary 189 pairs*	3.	(Netherlands) Bas Drijver	(Netherlands) Bob Drijver
2006 Piešťany, Slovakia 142 pairs	1.	(Sweden) Cecilia Rimstedt	(Sweden) Sara Sivelind
2006 Piešťany, Slovakia 142 pairs	2.	(Poland) Jacek Kalita	(Poland) Krzysztof Kotorowicz
2006 Piešťany, Slovakia 142 pairs	3.	(Netherlands) Marion Michielsen	(Netherlands) Vincent de Pagter
After 2006 the European Youth Pairs resumed as a distinct meet conducted in even years.
Beginning 2009 the World Youth Pairs became part of a "Youth Congress" including teams events.
2009 Istanbul, Turkey 94 pairs	1.	(Netherlands) Marion Michielsen	(Netherlands) Tim Verbeek
2009 Istanbul, Turkey 94 pairs	2.	(Poland) Adam Krysa	(Poland) Justyna Zmuda
2009 Istanbul, Turkey 94 pairs	3.	(France) Aymeric Lebatteux	(France) Nicolas Lhuissier
2011 Opatija, Croatia 61 pairs	1.	(Netherlands) Berend van den Bos	(Netherlands) Joris van Lankveld
2011 Opatija, Croatia 61 pairs	2.	(France) Aymeric Lebatteux	(France) Simon Poulat
2011 Opatija, Croatia 61 pairs	3.	(United States) Marius Agica	(Romania) Radu Nistor
2013 Atlanta, USA 32 pairs	1.	(Italy) Massimiliano Di Franco	(Italy) Gabriele Zanasi
2013 Atlanta, USA 32 pairs	2.	(Turkey) Erkmen Aydogdu	(Turkey) Akin Koclar
2013 Atlanta, USA 32 pairs	3.	(United States) Alex Prairie	(United States) Sylvia Shi

*The 2003 field of 189 pairs included the under-21 stratum covered below.

After 2006 the European Youth Pairs Championships were rejuvenated as a separate event, contested in even-number years, now restricted to European national pairs (two players from the same EBL member). European pairs had won all of the medals in six renditions of the world event, with only one transnational pair among the 18 medalists (1997 silver), and they have continued to win at the world level.

The "World" event is now contested in odd years at the World Youth Bridge Congress.

Officially the 2006 and 2009 events are now the 6th and 7th in the Junior MP Pairs series. The 2009 events were reported as part of the "1st World Youth Congress", much as the 2008 and 2010 events were reported as part of the 1st World Mind Sports Games and the World Bridge Series.

[quote] The 1st World Youth Bridge Congress was held in Istanbul, Turkey, from 15 to 23 August 2009, hosted at the Yeditepe University. Young players from all member countries of the World Bridge Federation were invited to participate in this new competition, designed to be a massive event. Accordingly, transnational combinations were allowed in all events, and there were no restrictions on the number of players who could participate from any single country.

The new congress included various teams and pairs competitions. Teams were played according to the Swiss format, as well as Board-A-match. There were Match Point and IMP pairs. The championships were open to players born in 1984 or later (Under-26), while it was intended that players born in 1989 or later would form a separate category (Under-21) in all events, if the entry was sufficient.

The World Youth Pairs Championships have been discontinued, as they are now included in the World Youth Congress.

=== Youngsters ===
The 2003 "Schools" medalists were the highest ranking eligible pairs in the unified field. They ranked 5, 21, and 37 among the 189 Juniors pairs from 27 countries. About one quarter of the field was eligible for the Schools medals.

In 2006 there were 210 Juniors pairs from 34 countries in 5 of 8 world zones. The Schools pairs competed separately for the first time, which the WBF calls the first championship in its Youngsters category. Six of the top twelve pairs were from Poland including the gold and silver medalists.

Year, Site, Entries		Medalists	
2003 Tata, Hungary	1.	(Netherlands) Jacco Hop	(Netherlands) Vincent de Pagter
2003 Tata, Hungary	2.	(Argentina) Agustin Madala	(England) Shivam Shah
2003 Tata, Hungary	3.	(France) Jean-Francois Grias	(France) Romain Tembouret
2006 Piešťany, Slovakia; 68 pairs	1.	(Poland) Bartlomiej Igla	(Poland) Artur Machno
2006 Piešťany, Slovakia; 68 pairs	2.	(Poland) Andrzej Bernatowicz	(Poland) Jan Betley
2006 Piešťany, Slovakia; 68 pairs	3.	(France) Pierre Franceschetti	(France) Andrea Landry
2009, Istanbul (evidently there were too few under-21 entries)
2011, Opatija (evidently there were too few under-21 entries)
2013 Atlanta, USA 40 pairs	1.	(United States) Allison Hunt	(United States) Asya Ladyzhensky
2013 Atlanta, USA 40 pairs	2.	(United States) Andrew Jeng	(United States) Richard Jeng
2013 Atlanta, USA 40 pairs	3.	(China) Tianyi Jin	(China) Kai Jin
2013 12 girls pairs	1.	(Italy) Giorgia Botta	(Italy) Margherita Chavarria
2013 12 girls pairs	2.	(Venezuela) Karla De Jesus	(Venezuela) Adriana Suarez
2013 12 girls pairs	3.	(United States) Julie Arbit	(United States) Isha Thapa

Contemporary reporting calls the Schools stratum in 2003 and Schools flight in 2006 successful, with 40-odd and 68 participants. Yet WBF lists only the single official rendition in 2006. The 2009 Congress homepage implies that entries by Youngsters must have been too few.

With merely 61 entries, the 2011 Junior Pairs is smaller than the separate event for Youngsters in 2006, when the two flights saw 142 and 68 pairs.

== European Junior Pairs ==
The European event was held 1991 in Fiesch, Switzerland and 1993 in Oberreifenberg, Germany, then incorporated in the new World event. (The field counts finalists only.)

For six cycles 1995 to 2006, the European championships were incorporated in the World championships. The European champion was the highest ranking pair with both players from Europe, (Note: That is, both partners registered in national organizations that belong to the EBL, which range geographically from Iceland to Israel.) second place in Europe was the second-ranking such pair, and so on. In fact, all eighteen of the World medalists were European pairs.

European predecessor to World Juniors Pairs, before 1995
Year, Site, Entries		Medalists	
1991 Europe Fiesch, Switzerland 104 pairs	1.	(Austria) Tilmann Seidel	(Austria) Alexander Wodniansky
1991 Europe Fiesch, Switzerland 104 pairs	2.	(Germany) Julia Korus	(Germany) Michael Tomski
1991 Europe Fiesch, Switzerland 104 pairs	3.	(Denmark) Mathias Bruun	(Denmark) Henrik Iversen
1993 Europe Oberreifenberg, Germany 100 pairs	1.	(Denmark) Jesper Dall	(Denmark) Jesper Thomsen
1993 Europe Oberreifenberg, Germany 100 pairs	2.	(Poland) Mariusz Puczynski	(Poland) Tomasz Puczynski
1993 Europe Oberreifenberg, Germany 100 pairs	3.	(Norway) Tore Skoglund	(Norway) Ole Torhaug

European Youth again, 2008 9th European Youth Pairs Championship, 2008. EBL. and 2010 10th European Youth Pairs Championship, 2010. EBL.

European complement to World Youth Pairs, after 2006
Year, Site, Entries		Juniors	Youngsters	Girls
2008 Wrocław, Poland 162 pairs	1.	(France) France; Thomas Bessis, Frederic Volcker	Poland	Poland
2008 Wrocław, Poland 162 pairs	2.	(Poland) Poland; Michal Nowosadzki, Piotr Wiankowski	Poland	Poland
2008 Wrocław, Poland 162 pairs	3.	(Italy) Italy; Arrigo Franchi, Matteo Montanari	Belarus–Poland	Czech Republic
		70 Juniors	59 Youngsters	33 Girls
2010 Opatija, Croatia; 73 Juniors; 44 Youngsters; 22 Girls; 139 pairs	1.	(Greece) Greece; Konstantinos Doxiadis, Vassilis Vroustis	Sweden	Poland
2010 Opatija, Croatia; 73 Juniors; 44 Youngsters; 22 Girls; 139 pairs	2.	(Latvia) Latvia; Janis Bethers, Martins Lorencs	Poland	Czech Republic
2010 Opatija, Croatia; 73 Juniors; 44 Youngsters; 22 Girls; 139 pairs	3.	(Poland) Poland; Joanna Krawczyk, Artur Wasiak	Poland	France

The predecessor European event was held 1991 in Fiesch, Switzerland and 1993 in Oberreifenberg, Schmitten, Germany. ("Oberreifenberg", German Wikipedia)

== Even years ==
Youth pairs tournaments contested in even-number years are officially separate from the "World Youth Pairs" series. At the official world championship level, the recent instances have been under-28 pairs and individuals tournaments at the first "World Bridge Games" in 2008. There were no major events for youth pairs or individuals at the renamed "World Bridge Series" in 2010.

Under-28 Pairs
Year, Site, Entries		Medalists	matchpoints
2008 Beijing, China; World Mind Sports Games 198 pairs	1.	Turkey; Mehmet Remzi Şakirler, Melih Osman Şen	59.81%
2008 Beijing, China; World Mind Sports Games 198 pairs	2.	Israel; Lotan Fisher, Ron Schwartz	59.65%
2008 Beijing, China; World Mind Sports Games 198 pairs	3.	Poland; Joanna Krawczyk, Piotr Tuczyński	58.82%

Youth events at the first "World Bridge Games" concluded with a two-day tournament for Individuals under age 28. The medal flight was restricted to 52 players who qualified in the preceding Pairs tournament.

Under-28 Individuals
Year, Site, Entries		Medalists	matchpoints
2008 Beijing, China; World Mind Sports Games 220 entries 52 in medal flight	1.	(Turkey) Salih Murat Anter	58.22%
2008 Beijing, China; World Mind Sports Games 220 entries 52 in medal flight	2.	(Romania) Radu Nistor	55.54%
2008 Beijing, China; World Mind Sports Games 220 entries 52 in medal flight	3.	(Norway) Lars Arthur Johansen	54.59%

== See also ==
- Bridge at the 1st World Mind Sports Games
- World Junior Teams Championship
