= Bandy World Championship Y-19 =

International bandy competition

- Status: Active
- Genre: Sports event
- Frequency: Biannual
- Location: Various
- Inaugurated: 1968; 58 years ago
- Organizer: FIB

Bandy World Championship Y-19 is a Youth Bandy World Championship up to the age of 19 years. Usually, only the core bandy playing nations are taking part.

== History ==
The first Bandy World Championship Y-19 was held in 1968 and it has been held every two years since then. In 1994 and 1996 it was Y20 teams instead.

The designation is sometimes given as U-19 instead of Y-19, but the meaning is the same. Only players under the age of 19 take part.

In 2014, the World Championship Y19 was played in Oslo. Russia beat Finland in the final and Sweden won the bronze medals.

== Results ==
Year	Host	Final			Third place match		
Year	Host	Champion	Score	Runner-up	Third place	Score	Fourth place
1968	Finland	Sweden		Soviet Union	Finland		
1970	Soviet Union	Soviet Union		Sweden	Finland		
1972	Norway	Sweden		Soviet Union	Norway		
1974	Sweden	Soviet Union		Sweden	Norway		
1976	Sweden	Soviet Union		Norway	Sweden		
1978	Soviet Union	Sweden		Soviet Union	Finland		
1980	Finland	Soviet Union		Sweden	Finland		
1982	Norway	Sweden		Finland	Soviet Union		
1984	Sweden	Sweden		Soviet Union	Norway		
1986	Soviet Union	Soviet Union		Sweden	Finland		
1988	Finland	Sweden		Soviet Union	Finland		
1990	Norway	Sweden		Soviet Union	Finland		
1992	Sweden	Sweden		Russia	Norway		
1994	Russia	Russia		Sweden	Finland		
1996	Finland	Sweden		Finland	Russia		
1998	Norway	Russia		Sweden	Finland		
2000	Sweden	Sweden		Russia	Finland		
2002	Russia	Sweden		Finland	Russia		
2004	Finland	Russia		Sweden	Finland		
2006	(Norway) Drammen	Sweden	6–4	Russia	Finland	8–2	Norway
2008	(Sweden) Söderhamn	Russia	9–1	Finland	Sweden	14–2	Norway
2010	(Russia) Ulyanovsk	Sweden	4–2	Finland	Russia	4–0	Norway
2012	(Finland) Pori	Russia	4–1	Sweden	Norway	7–3	Finland
2014	(Norway) Oslo	Russia	11–7	Finland	Sweden	6–3	Norway
2016	(Sweden) Trollhättan	Sweden	5–4	Russia	Finland	5–1	Norway
2017	(Russia) Syktyvkar	Russia	1–0 (OT)	Sweden	Finland	3–0	Norway
2018	(Norway) Drammen	Russia	6–3	Sweden	Norway	3–2 (OT)	Finland
2019	(Russia) Krasnoyarsk	Russia	2–1	Sweden	Finland	4–1	Norway
2020	(Finland) Helsinki	Russia	3–2 (OT)	Sweden	Finland	1–0	Norway
2022	(Sweden) Katrineholm	Sweden	10–2	Norway	Finland		
2023	(Sweden) Gothenburg	Sweden	5–4	Finland	Norway	–	Hungary
2024	(Norway) Oslo	Sweden	11–6	Norway	Finland		
2025	(Sweden) Sandviken	Sweden	6–2	Finland	Norway	24–4	Hungary
2026	(Sweden) Uppsala	Sweden	12–2	Norway	Finland		

== Medal table ==
Rank	Nation	Gold	Silver	Bronze	Total
1	Sweden (SWE)	19	12	3	34
2	Russia (RUS)	10	4	3	17
3	Soviet Union (URS)	5	6	1	12
4	Finland (FIN)	0	8	19	27
5	Norway (NOR)	0	4	8	12
Totals (5 entries)		34	34	34	102
