= World Junior Teams Championship =

Bridge competition

The World Junior Teams Championship is a bridge competition for zonal teams of players up to about 25 years old. (Note: Now "under-26" (u-26, U26) means that players must be under 26 at the end of the calendar year. So they may celebrate their 25th birthdays during the year; Junior competition during calendar 2011 is restricted to players born 1986 and later. Most world championship tournaments are played during summer and fall seasons; more than half but not all players are eligible to compete once after their 25th birthdays. The European Bridge League demarcations are u-26 (junior) and u-21 (youngster). It appears that the WBF plans to use the same restrictions universally after the first World Bridge Games (2008).) (Note: For three years WBF has called the under-28 bridge tournaments at the first Games exceptional, and said that the quadrennial Games would henceforth feature the u-26 and u-21 categories that are now standard in bridge. According to a July 2011 announcement, however, the World Youth Teams will not be part of the 2nd Games (August 2012). Rather, the Mind Sports Games will again feature u-28 teams and the now-three flights of World Youth Teams will be held July/August in Cuba. Youth Bridge Schedule Changes. Central America & Caribbean Bridge Federation. Quoting the ACBL Daily Bulletin, Summer 2012 NABC. Confirmed 2011-10-04.) (Note: This article covers all of the Teams events in the World Bridge Federation youth program, including experimental or obsolete events for age-limited teams, which are not now part of WBF Youth Bridge. See World Junior Pairs Championship for Pairs and Individuals events)

Zonal signifies both organization by the World Bridge Federation (WBF) and qualification in eight WBF zones; for example (2006, 2008), six teams qualify from 'Europe' defined by European Bridge League membership. Zones may require national representation; for example, the six European teams must represent six member nations of the EBL.

The oldest event, sometimes called the Junior Teams without qualification, dates from 1987 with some changes in definition. Today that is the "open" u-26 tournament (Juniors) in contrast to the u-26 for women (Girls), the open u-21 (Youngsters) and the open u-16 (Kids). It has been held every two years, odd-number years to 2005, even years from 2006-2018, and odd years from 2023 onwards. Competitors vie for the Ortiz-Patiño Trophy, formerly presented by WBF President Emeritus Jaime Ortiz-Patiño (1930–2013) who conceived the idea while serving as WBF President in 1985. The even-year tournaments officially constitute the World Youth Teams Championships for so-called juniors, girls, and youngsters. The entries are national teams, representing countries affiliated with the WBF via membership in the eight geographical "zonal organizations". Moreover, they must qualify within their zones, usually by high standing in a zonal championship tournament that is limited to one team per member nation.

The 2008 junior teams championships were part of the inaugural World Mind Sports Games in Beijing, China. Denmark won its second gold medal, beating Poland in the final, while Norway won the bronze. The 1st Games also included under-28 and under-21 team championships won by Norway and France. Under-21 and u-26 are part of the WBF youth program (namely, two of the three World Youth Teams Championships) but u-28 is not.

In 2010 Israel defeated France in the Juniors final while China won the bronze medal. The event was part of the newly christened World Bridge Series that also included World Young Ladies Teams and under-21 World Youngsters Teams, both won by Poland.

In 2011, at the 2nd World Youth Congress, "Ned Juniors" comprising four players from the Netherlands won the main teams event, a six-day tournament with 27 entries. Ned Juniors won the full-day 56-deal final by 131 to 60 IMPs against "Arg Uru" from Argentina and Uruguay. Meanwhile, "Ned Rum", with one Dutch pair and one transnational pair from Romania and the United States, won third place against "France". (Note: (Board 1, Session 3) Here is the information online for every single deal, available by linking down via the "Results (linked schedule)". Bidding and play are not available for this match or event.)

Arg Uru led the preliminary round-robin from which eight teams advanced to full-day knockout matches, and its second-place finish matched that by Argentina in 1989, the best finish for any youth players from outside Europe and North America.

The World Youth Congress, rebranded to the World Youth Transnational Championships in 2022, occurs in years between World Junior Team Championships. This tournament is transnational: pairs and teams comprising players from different bridge nations are eligible to enter. Prior to 2026, medal ceremonies raise the national flag and play the national anthem of the gold medal winner if the team national in composition. In the 2026 World Youth Transnational Championships, the World Bridge Federation instead chose to play the anthem of the World Bridge Federation.

== Scope ==
The Junior Teams event (or tournament in a narrow sense) officially became part of the plural "World Youth Teams Championships" when a tournament for under-21 players was initiated. Beginning 2009, teams events were added to the WBF youth program for odd-number years, contested immediately prior to the older events for pairs in the newly christened "World Youth Congress".

Odd-year teams events are distinct from the older series of teams championships (now biennial in even years) and even-year pairs events are distinct from the older series of pairs championships (now biennial in odd years). Some conditions differ.

This article covers all "world championships" for youth teams while World Junior Pairs Championship covers all "world championships" for youth pairs or individuals.

== Results ==
The World Youth Teams Championships now comprise four concurrent events or flights: the original Juniors, the Youngsters from 2004, the Girls from 2010, and the Kids from 2015.

Since the first iteration of the World Youth Team Championships, the format has been that of a round-robin, out of which a certain number of teams qualify to the knockout stage. However, this number has changed depending on the total number of teams. The1987 iteration qualified only 2 teams into the knockout, while the 2025 iteration qualified 8 teams into the knockout in each category.

=== Juniors ===
The Netherlands won the inaugural world championship for junior teams in 1987 and won the Bermuda Bowl in 1993 with three of the recent junior players: De Boer, Leufkens, and Westra. No other junior teams champions have so quickly won the Bermuda Bowl.

Year, Site, Entries		Juniors Medalists
1987 Amsterdam, Netherlands 5 teams	1.	Netherlands; Wubbo de Boer, Jan Jansma, Enri Leufkens, Marcel Nooijen, Rob van Wel, Berry Westra
1987 Amsterdam, Netherlands 5 teams	2.	France; Bénédicte Cronier, Alexis Damamme, Christian Desrousseaux, Franck Multon, Jean-Christophe Quantin, (François Crozet)*
1987 Amsterdam, Netherlands 5 teams	3.	(United States) USA; Guy Doherty, Jon Heller, Billy Hsieh, Asya Kamsky, Aaron Silverstein
1989 Nottingham, England 8 teams	1.	(United Kingdom) Great Britain; John Hobson, Derek Patterson, John Pottage, Andrew Robson, Gerald Tredinnick, Stuart Tredinnick
1989 Nottingham, England 8 teams	2.	Argentina; Alejandro Bianchedi, Marcelo Cloppet, Juan Quitegui, Claudio Varela, (Alexis Pejacsevich, Leonardo Rizzo)*
1989 Nottingham, England 8 teams	3.	France; Alexis Damamme, Christian Desrousseaux, Pierre-Jean Louchart, Franck Multon, Jean-Christophe Quantin
1991 Ann Arbor, Michigan, USA 12 teams	1.	(United States) USA 2 (Note: 'USA 1' and 'USA 2' were the first and second qualifying teams from the US. Except in the World Mind Sports Games (2008), the United States has been represented by two national teams in the Juniors flight from 1991 and in all renditions of the Youngsters flight. They have been designated '1' and '2' except 'red' and 'blue' in the first two Youngsters. See World Youth Team Championships and its subpages.); Martha Benson, John Diamond, Jeff Ferro, Brian Platnick, Wayne Stuart, Debbie Zuckerberg
1991 Ann Arbor, Michigan, USA 12 teams	2.	Canada; Mark Caplan, Fred Gitelman, Bronia Gmach, Geoff Hampson, Michael Roberts, Eric Sutherland
1991 Ann Arbor, Michigan, USA 12 teams	3.	Australia; Robert Fruewirth, Matthew Mullamphy, Peter Newman, John Spooner, Ben Thompson, Jim Wallis
1993 Aarhus, Denmark 15 teams	1.	Germany; Guido Hopfenheit, Marcus Joest, Klaus Reps, Roland Rohowsky, (Rolf Kühn, Frank Pioch)**
1993 Aarhus, Denmark 15 teams	2.	Norway; Lasse Aaseng, Geir Helgemo, Svein Gunnar Karlberg, Espen Kvam, Jørgen Molberg, Kurt-Ove Thomassen
1993 Aarhus, Denmark 15 teams	3.	(United States) USA 1 Jeff Ferro, Eric Greco, Leni Holtz, Rich Pavlicek Jr., Kevin Wilson, Debbie Zuckerberg
1995 Bali, Indonesia 12 teams	1.	(United Kingdom) Great Britain; Jeffrey Allerton, Danny Davies, Jason Hackett, Justin Hackett, Phil Souter, Tom Townsend
1995 Bali, Indonesia 12 teams	2.	New Zealand; David Ackerley, Ashley Bach, Ishmael Del'Monte, Nigel Kearney, Charles Ker, Scott Smith
1995 Bali, Indonesia 12 teams	3.	Denmark; Freddy Brøndum, Mathias Bruun, Nicolai Kampmann, Lars Lund Madsen, Morten Lund Madsen, Jacob Røn
1997 Hamilton, Ontario, Canada 18 teams	1.	Denmark; Freddy Brøndum, Mik Kristensen, Lars Lund Madsen, Morten Lund Madsen, Mikkel Bensby Nøhr, Jacob Røn
1997 Hamilton, Ontario, Canada 18 teams	2.	Norway; Boye Brogeland, Thomas Charlsen, Espen Erichsen, Christer Kristoffersen, Bjørn Morten Mathisen, Øyvind Saur
1997 Hamilton, Ontario, Canada 18 teams	3.	Russia; Arseni Chour, Youri Khiouppenen, Jouri Khokhlov, Dmitri Lobov, Alexander Petrunin, Boris Sazonov
1999 Fort Lauderdale, Florida, USA 16 teams	1.	Italy; Bernardo Biondo, Mario D'Avossa, Riccardo Intonti, Matteo Mallardi, (Furio Di Bello, Stelio Di Bello)**
1999 Fort Lauderdale, Florida, USA 16 teams	2.	(United States) USA 2 Tom Carmichael, Eric Greco, Chris Willenken, Joel Wooldridge, (Chris Carmichael, David Wiegand)*
1999 Fort Lauderdale, Florida, USA 16 teams	3.	Denmark; Gregers Bjarnarson, Anders Hagen, Kasper Konow, Mik Kristensen, Morten Lund Madsen, Mikkel Bensby Nøhr
2001 Mangaratiba, Brazil 17 teams	1.	(United States) USA 1 Brad Campbell, Joe Grue, John Hurd, John Kranyak, Kent Mignocchi, Joel Wooldridge
2001 Mangaratiba, Brazil 17 teams	2.	Israel; Asaf Amit, Inon Liran, Yossi Roll, Ranny Schneider, Yaniv Vax, Aran Warzawsky
2001 Mangaratiba, Brazil 17 teams	3.	Denmark; Michael Askgaard, Gregers Bjarnarson, Kåre Gjaldbæk, Jonas Houmøller, Andreas Marquardsen, Martin Schaltz
2003 Saint-Cloud, Paris, France 16 teams	1.	Italy; Furio Di Bello, Stelio Di Bello, Ruggiero Guariglia, Fabio Lo Presti, Francesco Mazzadi, Stefano Uccello
2003 Saint-Cloud, Paris, France 16 teams	2.	Denmark; Kåre Gjaldbæk, Boje Henriksen, Bjørg Houmøller, Jonas Houmøller, Andreas Marquardsen, Martin Schaltz
2003 Saint-Cloud, Paris, France 16 teams	3.	(United States) USA 2 Kevin Bathurst, Joe Grue, John Hurd, John Kranyak, Kent Mignocchi, Joel Wooldridge
2005 Sydney, Australia (Juniors only) 18 teams	1.	(United States) USA 1 Ari Greenberg, Joe Grue, John Hurd, John Kranyak, Justin Lall, Joel Wooldridge
2005 Sydney, Australia (Juniors only) 18 teams	2.	Poland; Konrad Araszkiewicz, Krzysztof Buras, Jacek Kalita, Krzysztof Kotorowicz, Piotr Mądry, Wojciech Strzemecki
2005 Sydney, Australia (Juniors only) 18 teams	3.	Canada; Tim Capes, Vincent Demuy, David Grainger, Charles Halasi, Daniel Lavee, Gavin Wolpert
2006 Bangkok, Thailand 18 teams	1.	(United States) USA 1 Joshua Donn, Jason Feldman, Ari Greenberg, Joe Grue, John Kranyak, Justin Lall
2006 Bangkok, Thailand 18 teams	2.	Italy; Andrea Boldrini, Stelio Di Bello, Francesco Ferrari, Fabio Lo Presti, Alberto Sangiorgio, Matteo Sbarigia
2006 Bangkok, Thailand 18 teams	3.	Singapore; Alex Loh, Choon Chou Loo, Kelvin Ng, Hua Poon, Fabian Tan, Li Yu Tan
2008 Beijing, China 18 teams	1.	Denmark; Dennis Bilde, Anne-Sofie Houlberg, Jonas Houmoller, Emil Jepsen, Lars Kirkegaard Nielsen, Martin Schaltz
2008 Beijing, China 18 teams	2.	Poland; Piotr Nawrocki, Michal Nowosadzki, Przemyslaw Piotrowski, Jan Sikora, Artur Wasiak, Piotr Wiankowski
2008 Beijing, China 18 teams	3.	Norway; Erik Berg, Ivar Berg, Petter Eide, Espen Lindqvist, Allan Livgard, Tor Ove Reistad
2010 Philadelphia, USA 17 teams	1.	Israel; Eliran Argelazi, Alon Birman, Lotan Fisher, Ron Schwartz, Bar Tarnovski
2010 Philadelphia, USA 17 teams	2.	France; Thomas Bessis, Christophe Grosset, Nicolas Lhuissier, Cedric Lorenzini, Quentin Robert, Frederic Volcker
2010 Philadelphia, USA 17 teams	3.	China; Yichao Chen, Junjie Hu, Zisu Lin, Yinghao Liu, Yinpei Shao, Di Zhuo
2012 Taicang, China 20 teams	1.	Netherlands; Berend van den Bos, Aarnout Helmich, Gerbrand Hop, Joris van Lankveld, Ernst Wackwitz, Chris Westerbeek
2012 Taicang, China 20 teams	2.	Israel; Eyal Erez, Lotan Fisher, Gal Gerstner, Moshe Meyuchas, Dror Padon, Lee Rosenthal
2012 Taicang, China 20 teams	3.	Australia; Adam Edgtton, Nabil Edgtton, Peter Hollands, Justin Howard, Andy Pei-en Hung, Liam Milne
2014 Koç University, Istanbul, Turkey 22 teams	1.	Norway; Harald Eide, Mats Eide, Kristian Ellingsen, Tor Eivind Grude, Kristoffer Hegge
2014 Koç University, Istanbul, Turkey 22 teams	2.	Netherlands; Joris van Lankveld, Tobias Polak, Tom van Overbeeke, Ernst Wackwitz, Chris Westerbeek, Ricardo Westerbeek
2014 Koç University, Istanbul, Turkey 22 teams	3.	Poland; Maciej Bielawski, Pawel Jassem, Michal Klukowski, Slawomir Niajko, Piotr Tuczynski, Jakub Wojcieszek
2016 Salsomaggiore, Italy 22 teams	1.	Poland; Marcin Bojarski, Maksymilian Chodacki, Wojciech Kazmierczak, Michal Klukowski, Kamil Nowak, Justyna Zmuda, Marek Markowski (npc)
2016 Salsomaggiore, Italy 22 teams	2.	China; Yanfeng Chen, Sili Liu, Shiyu Sun, Zhi Tang, Yong Tao, Hongji Wei, Jun Ji (npc), Jun Ji (coach)
2016 Salsomaggiore, Italy 22 teams	3.	Sweden; Simon Ekenberg, Mikael Gronkvist, Daniel Gullberg, Simon Hult, Mikael Rimstedt, Ola Rimstedt, Martin Loefgren (npc), Tom Gards (coach)
2018 Wujiang District, Suzhou, China 22 teams	1.	Sweden; Ida Grönkvist, Mikael Gronkvist, Simon Hult, Mikael Rimstedt, Ola Rimstedt, Adam Stokka, Martin Loefgren (npc), Tom Gards (coach)
2018 Wujiang District, Suzhou, China 22 teams	2.	Singapore; Ryan Chan, Peter Haw, Yu Chen Liu, Jazlene Ong, Ming Yang Zhou, Xin Chen Zhu, Yisheng Kelvin Ong (npc), Choon Chou Loo (coach)
2018 Wujiang District, Suzhou, China 22 teams	3.	Netherlands; Veri Kiljan, Guy Mendes De Leon, Michel Schols, Thibo Sprinkhuizen, Luc Tijssen, Ricardo Westerbeek, Agnes Snellers (npc), Wubbo De Boer (coach)
2023 Veldhoven, the Netherlands 20 teams	1.	Netherlands; Youp Caris, Pim Dupont, Oscar Nijssen, Stefan Thorpe, Tim van de Pevard, Sibrand van Oosten, Agnes Snellers (npc), Wubbo de Boer (coach)
2023 Veldhoven, the Netherlands 20 teams	2.	Singapore; Heng Gao, Linus Lee, Xue Heng Teo, Timothy Jian Zhong Wu, Nuoyi Xu, Bryan Yang, Jiening Xu (npc), Shen Ting Ang (coach)
2023 Veldhoven, the Netherlands 20 teams	3.	Poland; Jakub Bazyluk, Krzystof Cichy, Maciej Kedzierski, Tomasz Kielbasa, Kacper Kopka, Blazej Krawczyk, Marek Markowski (captain)
2025 Salsomaggiore, Italy 20 teams	1.	Sweden; Andreas Abragi, Sanna Clementsson, Erik Hansson, Ivar Lichtenstein, Castor Mann, Alexander Sandin, Erik Fryklund (npc), Mikael Rimstedt (coach)
2025 Salsomaggiore, Italy 20 teams	2.	(United States) USA2; Cornelius Duffie, Jacob Freeman, Richard Jeng, Olivia Schireson, Brent Xiao, Rory Xiao, Christian Jolly (npc)
2025 Salsomaggiore, Italy 20 teams	3.	Italy; Cristina Brusotti, Alessandro Carletti, Luca Draghi, Vincenzo Beniamino Fresa, Matteo Lombardi, Federico Porta, Dario Attanasio (npc), Valerio Giubilo (coach)

* Crozet in 1987, Pejacsevich–Rizzo in 1989, and C. Carmichael–Wiegand in 1999 did not play enough boards in order to qualify for second place
** Kühn–Pioch in 1993 and F. Di Bello–S. Di Bello in 1999 did not play enough boards in order to qualify for the title of World Champion

=== Youngsters ===
Year, Site, Entries		Youngsters Medalists
2004 New York City, USA (Youngsters only) 6 teams	1.	Poland; Marcin Malesa, Piotr Nawrocki, Filip Niziol, Michal Nowosadzki, Przemyslaw Piotrowski, Jan Sikora
2004 New York City, USA (Youngsters only) 6 teams	2.	Israel; Eliran Argelazi, Eran Assaraf, Alon Birman, Gilad Ofir
2004 New York City, USA (Youngsters only) 6 teams	3.	Norway; Petter Eide, Espen Lindqvist, Allan Livgard, Steffen Fredrik Simonsen
2006 Bangkok, Thailand 16 teams	1.	(Israel) Israel; Eliran Argelazi, Alon Birman, Dror Padon, Ron Segev, Dana Tal, Bar Tarnovski
2006 Bangkok, Thailand 16 teams	2.	(Latvia) Latvia; Jurijs Balasovs, Janis Bethers, Peteris Bethers, Adrians Imsa, Martins Lorencs
2006 Bangkok, Thailand 16 teams	3.	(Poland) Poland; Piotr Butryn, Bartlomiej Igla, Artur Machno, Maciej Sikora, Joanna Krawczyk, Artur Wasiak
2008 Beijing, China 18 teams	1.	(Netherlands) France; Marion Canonne, Pierre Franceschetti, Alexandre Kilani, Aymeric Lebatteux, Nicolas Lhuissier, Cedric Lorenzini
2008 Beijing, China 18 teams	2.	England; Adam Hickman, Edward Jones, Daniel McIntosh, Robert Myers, Benjamin Paske, Thomas Paske
2008 Beijing, China 18 teams	3.	China; Simin Chen, Yichao Chen, Chunhui Dong, Junjie Hu, Yujie Jiang, Qi Song
2010 Philadelphia, USA 16 teams	1.	Poland; Pawel Jassem, Tomasz Jochymski, Wojciech Kazmierczak, Mateusz Mroczkowski, Adam Smieszkol, Piotr Tuczynski
2010 Philadelphia, USA 16 teams	2.	England; Daniel McIntosh, Thomas Paske, James Paul, Thomas Rainforth, Graeme Robertson, Shivam Shah
2010 Philadelphia, USA 16 teams	3.	Netherlands; Lotte Leufkens, Vincent Nab, Rens Philipsen, Rik van Leeuwen, Thijs Verbeek, Ernst Wackwitz
2012 Taicang, China 20 teams	1.	Poland; Michal Gulczynski, Wojciech Kazmierczak, Michal Klukowski, Igor Losiewicz, Andrzej Terszak, Lukasz Witkowski
2012 Taicang, China 20 teams	2.	(United States) USA 1 Zachary Brescoll, Adam Grossack, Zachary Grossack, Andrew Jeng, Richard Jeng, Adam Kaplan
2012 Taicang, China 20 teams	3.	France; Julien Bernard, Ivan Caillau, Fabrice Charignon, Baptiste Combescure, Clement Laboureyre, Grégoire Lafont
2014 Koç University, Istanbul, Turkey 16 teams	1.	Sweden; Ida Grönkvist, Mikael Rimstedt, Ola Rimstedt, Johan Säfsten
2014 Koç University, Istanbul, Turkey 16 teams	2.	(United States) USA1; Nolan Chang, Christopher Huber, Oren Kriegel, Benjamin Kristensen, Kevin Rosenberg, Cole Spencer
2014 Koç University, Istanbul, Turkey 16 teams	3.	Norway; Christian Bakke, Espen Flaatt, Joakim Saether, Marcus Scheie
2016 Salsomaggiore, Italy 18 teams	1.	Italy; Francesco Chiarandini, Alvaro Gaiotti, Gianmarco Giubilo, Andrea Manganella, Federico Porta, Sebastiano Scata
2016 Salsomaggiore, Italy 18 teams	2.	Netherlands; Youp Caris, Pim Dupont, Oscar Nijssen, Sven Overvelde, Leen Stougie, Marc Stougie
2016 Salsomaggiore, Italy 18 teams	3.	China Hong Kong; Chris T H Chan, Alfred Lam, Niko Man, Jackson Tsang, Sam Tseng, Michael Wu
2018 Wujiang District, Suzhou, China 22 teams	1.	Sweden; Teo Bodin, Sanna Clementsson, Erik Hansson, Castor Mann, Alexander Sandin
2018 Wujiang District, Suzhou, China 22 teams	2.	Israel; Ilai Ilan Baniri, Nir Khutorsky, Tomer Loonstein, Gal Matatyahou, Yonatan Sliwowicz, Aviv Zeitak
2018 Wujiang District, Suzhou, China 22 teams	3.	France; Raphael Basler, Luc Bellicaud, Arthur Boulin, Melic Dufrene, Maxence Fragola, Theo Guillemin

=== Girls ===
Year, Site, Entries		Girls Medalists
2010 Philadelphia, USA 4 teams	1.	Poland; Ewa Grabowska, Magdalena Holeksa, Danuta Kazmucha, Natalia Sakowska, Joanna Krawczyk, Justyna Zmuda
2010 Philadelphia, USA 4 teams	2.	France; Marion Canonne, Claire Chaugny, Jessie Carbonneaux, Carole Puillet, Aurely Thizy
2010 Philadelphia, USA 4 teams	3.	China; Xiufen Chang, Xing Li, Yanjiao Liu, Wei Meng, Lulu Peng
2012 Taicang, China 20 teams	1.	Poland; Katarzyna Dufrat, Magdalena Holeksa, Danuta Kazmucha, Natalia Sakowska, Kamila Wesolowska, Justyna Zmuda
2012 Taicang, China 20 teams	2.	Netherlands; Natalia Banaś, Judith Nab, Jamilla Spangenberg, Sigrid Spangenberg, Magdaléna Tichá, Janneke Wackwitz
2012 Taicang, China 20 teams	3.	Italy; Giorgia Botta, Federica Butto, Margherita Chavarria, Margherita Costa, Flavia Lanzuisi, Michela Salvato
2014 Koç University, Istanbul, Turkey 13 teams	1.	France; Jessie de Tessières-Carbonneaux, Anne-Laure Huberschwiller-Tatarin, Anaïs Leleu, Jennifer Murgues, Aurélie Thizy, Mathilde Thuillez
2014 Koç University, Istanbul, Turkey 13 teams	2.	China; Li Chen, Bo Fu, Hanxiao Li, Xinyi Li, Qihao Wu, Bing Zhao
2014 Koç University, Istanbul, Turkey 13 teams	3.	Italy; Giorgia Botta, Caterina Burgio, Federica Butto, Margherita Chavarria, Margherita Costa, Michela Salvato
2016 Salsomaggiore, Italy 13 teams	1.	Netherlands; Merel Bruijnsteen, Natalia Gawel, Magdalena Ticha, Maaike Van Ommen, Esther Visser, Janneke Wackwitz
2016 Salsomaggiore, Italy 13 teams	2.	Australia; Jessica Brake, Renee Cooper, Kirstyn Fuller, Francesca McGrath, Ella Pattison
2016 Salsomaggiore, Italy 13 teams	3.	Norway; Katarina Ekren, Thea Hove Hauge, Thea Lucia Indrebo, Agnethe Hansen Kjensli, Sofie Grasholt Sjodal
2018 Wujiang District, Suzhou, China 15 teams	1.	China; Yijing Cai, Bo Fu, Chengke Hu, Xinyi Li, Xinyi Ni, Yang Yang
2018 Wujiang District, Suzhou, China 15 teams	2.	Poland; Zofia Baldysz, Hanna Ciunczyk, Joanna Kokot, Dominika Ocylok, Joanna Zalewska, Anna Zareba
2018 Wujiang District, Suzhou, China 15 teams	3.	France; Sarah Combescure, Marie-Valentine Coupel, Beryl Dufrene, Emeline Jounin, Anais Leleu, Mathilde Thuillez

=== Kids ===
Koç University, host of the 2014 championships, sponsored an invitational tournament for "National Kids Teams" of players born 1999 and later (age 15 and under, roughly). Seven invitations were accepted: five from Europe including host Turkey, India from Asia & the Middle East, and China from Asia Pacific.

The Kids played round-robin in three days with a four-team knockout, semifinals and finals, completed during the 5- and 6-day round-robin stages of the official events. France and Poland virtually tied the round robin (a margin less than 1/2 VP) and won the semifinals before Poland won the trophy over 42 deals. China beat Sweden in the third-place match. Meanwhile, India won a two-day, three-team contest for fifth place.

Poland, France, India, China and the host were represented in all four tournaments.

Year, Site, Entries		Kids Medalists
2014 Koç University, Istanbul, Turkey 7 teams	1.	Poland; Michael Kaleta, Kacper, Kopka, Michal Maszenda, Jakub Patreuha, Patryk Patreuha, Tomasz Pawelczyk
2014 Koç University, Istanbul, Turkey 7 teams	2.	France; Luc Bellicaud, Theo Guillemin, Romaric Guth, Victor Le Lez
2014 Koç University, Istanbul, Turkey 7 teams	3.	China; Zhiyu Cheng, Dongke Fang, Baozhuo Jiang, Randy Pan, Jiahe Shen, Zihan Wang
2016 Salsomaggiore, Italy 14 teams	1.	Israel; Shahar Dank, Nir Khutorsky, Gilad Lifshitz, Tomer Loonstein, Gal Matatyahou, Aviv Zeitak
2016 Salsomaggiore, Italy 14 teams	2.	China 2 Yunpeng Chen, Cheng Deng, Yizhou Liu, Xinyao Ruan, Penghao Wang, Ruizhe Wang
2016 Salsomaggiore, Italy 14 teams	3.	France; Maxence Fragola, Romaric Guth, Hugo Rabourdin, Clement Teil, Benoit Deveze
2018 Wujiang District, Suzhou, China 18 teams	1.	China 3 Tie Chen, Zanchao Cui, Xihong Dai, Sicheng Liu, Yiping Lu, Zichen Wang
2018 Wujiang District, Suzhou, China 18 teams	2.	France; Romain Bloch, Aurele Gallard, Leo Rombaut, Thibaut Zobel
2018 Wujiang District, Suzhou, China 18 teams	3.	(United States) USA; Michael Hu, Harrison Anders Luba, Rory Xiao, Michael Xu, Jonathan Yue, Arthur Zhou

== World Youth Transnational Championships ==
The World Youth Transnational Championships, the continuation of the World Youth Open Championships, which is the continuation of the World Youth Congress, is a distinct tournament in-between years of the World Youth Team Championships, with transnational entries permitted in all teams and pairs events.

40 teams entered the main event at the 1st World Youth Congress in 2009. At least two-thirds of the team names, and more among the strong performers, suggest a single nationality. "Japan Czech" won the final against "Italy Red" while "USA 1" won third place against "Netherlands Red". Evidently 8 teams advanced from preliminary play to knockout matches and there were no playoffs to distinguish any of the quarterfinal losers, 5th to 8th places.

(Some of the main events for teams at WBF meets are scheduled so that preliminary and quarterfinal losers are eligible to enter a secondary event that begins during the main event semifinals. For others only preliminary losers are available to enter the first stage of another event. For example, the 2nd World Youth Congress in 2011, the secondary BAM teams event was a consolation tournament initially among preliminary losers, the 9th to 27th place teams in the main prelim. Quarterfinal losers in the main event joined the consolation on its second day.)

27 teams entered at the 2nd Congress in 2011, all but four having team names that suggest a single nationality.

Year, Site, Entries		Medalists
2009 1st Youth Congress; Istanbul, Turkey 40 teams	1.	(Czech Republic) Japan Czech; Noriaki KOIKE (Jap), Michal KOPECKY (Cze), Milan MACURA (Cze), Hiroaki MIURA (Jap)
2009 1st Youth Congress; Istanbul, Turkey 40 teams	2.	Italy Red; Massimiliano DI FRANCO, Arrigo FRANCHI, Andrea MANNO, Aldo PAPARO
2009 1st Youth Congress; Istanbul, Turkey 40 teams	3.	(United States) USA 1 Jason CHIU, Kevin DWYER, Kevin FAY, Jeremy FOURNIER, Justin LALL, Matthew MECKSTROTH
2009 1st Youth Congress; Istanbul, Turkey 40 teams	4.	Netherlands Red; Bob DRIJVER, Marion MICHIELSEN, Danny MOLENAAR, Tim VERBEEK
2011 2nd Youth Congress; Opatija, Croatia 27 teams	1.	(Netherlands) NED Juniors; Berend van den BOS, Aarnout HELMICH, Gerbrand HOP, Joris van LANKVELD
2011 2nd Youth Congress; Opatija, Croatia 27 teams	2.	(Argentina) (Uruguay) ARG URU; Maximo CRUSIZIO (Arg), Felipe Jose FERRO (Arg), Rodrigo GARCIA DA ROSA (Uru), Alejandro SCANAVINO (Arg)
2011 2nd Youth Congress; Opatija, Croatia 27 teams	3.	(Netherlands) (Romania) (United States) NED RUM; Marius AGICA (USA), Bob DRIJVER (Ned), Radu NISTOR (Rom), Ernst WACKWITZ (Ned)
2011 2nd Youth Congress; Opatija, Croatia 27 teams	4.	France; Edouard DU CORAIL, Nicolas GAYDIER, Aymeric LEBATTEUX, Simon POULAT
From 2013-2019, the World Youth Congress was rebranded to the World Youth Open Championships
2013 3rd Youth Open; Atlanta, USA 12 Juniors teams	1.	(United States) War of Roses; Marius AGICA, Kevin DWYER, Adam GROSSACK, Zachary GROSSACK, Adam KAPLAN, Owen LIEN (all USA)
2013 3rd Youth Open; Atlanta, USA 12 Juniors teams	2.	Australia; Maxim HENBEST, Peter HOLLANDS, Justin HOWARD, Nathan HOWARD, Ellena MOSKOVSKY, Lauren TRAVIS
2013 3rd Youth Open; Atlanta, USA 12 Juniors teams	3.	Turkey; Erkmen AYDOGDU, Altug GOBEKLI, Berk GOKCE, Akin KOCLAR, Muhammet OZGUR, Sarper USLUPEHLIVAN
2013 3rd Youth Open; Atlanta, USA 12 Juniors teams	4.	Japan; Yuki HARADA, Koichiro HASHIMOTO, Kosuke ITO, Tadahiro KIKUCHI, Ryoko OYAMA, Takumi SESHIMO
2013 3rd Youth Open Atlanta, USA; 15 Youngsters teams	1.	(United States) USA Jeng; Andrew JENG, Richard JENG, Oren KRIEGEL, Burke SNOWDEN (all USA)
2013 3rd Youth Open Atlanta, USA; 15 Youngsters teams	2.	(United States) Kristensen; Brandon HARPER, Gregory HERMAN, Ben KRISTENSEN, Ryan MILLER (all USA)
2013 3rd Youth Open Atlanta, USA; 15 Youngsters teams	3.	China XNWY; Brandon Kai JIN, Tianyi JIN, Zhizhou SHA, Yiling SHEN, Kaiwen WU, Felica Xinying YU, Weichang QIU (NPC), Bing ZHAO (coach)
2013 3rd Youth Open Atlanta, USA; 15 Youngsters teams	4.	(United States) Berk; Samuel AMER, Hakan BERK, Nolan CHANG, Jake OLSEN, David SOUKUP (all USA)
2015 4th Youth Open Opatija, Croatia; 17 Juniors teams	1.	Zlatan; Giuseppe Delle Cave (Italy), Simon Ekenberg (Sweden), Rodrigo Garcia da Rosa (Argentina), Daniel Gullberg (Sweden), Simon Hult (Sweden), Johan Karlsson (Sweden), Marshall LEWIS (Croatia) (npc), Rodrigo GARCIA DA ROSA (Argentina) (coach)
2015 4th Youth Open Opatija, Croatia; 17 Juniors teams	2.	(Norway) Norway; Christian Bakke, Harald Eide, Tor Eivind Grude, Kristoffer Hegge
2015 4th Youth Open Opatija, Croatia; 17 Juniors teams	3.	(United States) Greswe Axon; Adam Kaplan (USA), Ioannis Oikonomopoulos (Greece) (playing captain), Mikael Rimstedt (Sweden), Ola Rimstedt (Sweden), Giorgos Oikonomopoulos (Greece) (coach)
2015 4th Youth Open Opatija, Croatia; 17 Juniors teams	4.	(Australia) Australia; Renee Cooper, Shane Harrsion, Maxim Henbest, Ella Pattison, Jamie Thompson, Stephen Williams, Justin Williams (npc)
2015 4th Youth Open Opatija, Croatia; 8 Youngsters teams	1.	(China) China; Dongke Fang, Zhengyang Fang, Shiyu Sun, Zihan Wang, Hongji Wei, Yichen Yin, Jichao Hu (npc), Tong Jiang (coach)
2015 4th Youth Open Opatija, Croatia; 8 Youngsters teams	2.	(Poland) AZS UW VYCESKA; Krystian Baczek, Piotr Jasinski, Stanislaw Maczka, Lukasz Trendak
2015 4th Youth Open Opatija, Croatia; 8 Youngsters teams	3.	(Germany) Germany; Florian Alter, Stig Jesse, Philipp Pabst, Sibrand van Oosten, Leonard Vornkhal, Hartmut Kondoch (npc)
2015 4th Youth Open Opatija, Croatia; 8 Youngsters teams	4.	(Italy) Italia; Francesco Chiarandini, Alvaro Gaiotti, Gabriele Giubilo, Gianmarco Giubilo, Andrea Manganella, Sebastiano Scata, Dario Attanasio (npc, coach)
2015 4th Youth Open Opatija, Croatia; 7 Girls teams	1.	(Italy) Italia; Susanna Broccolino, Caterina de Lutio, Agnese di Mauro, Michela Salvato, Giulia Scriattoli, Flaminia Tanini, Emanuela Capriata (npc, coach)
2015 4th Youth Open Opatija, Croatia; 7 Girls teams	2.	(China) SX XHLD; Yunpeng Chen, Chenyun Ge, Huiyuan Jin, Xinyao Ruan, Yue Yu, Aijia Yuan, Weichang Qiu (npc)
2015 4th Youth Open Opatija, Croatia; 7 Girls teams	3.	China RDFZ Girls; Mengqi Hao, Ling Hu, Guangli Wendy Liu, Xinyi Luo, Lingyi Ma, Qi Xia, Jichao Hu (npc), Tong Jiang (coach)
2015 4th Youth Open Opatija, Croatia; 7 Girls teams	4.	(China) SX XNMF; Wenying Huang, Xinying Lu, Liwen Shao, Yingying Sun, Min Wu, Yuqian Zhang, Yifan Cui (npc)
2015 4th Youth Open Opatija, Croatia; 13 Kids teams	1.	(China) SX HYSW; Renyu LIi, Siyuan Liu, Yijun Shang, Yiqin Shao, Yingqi Wang, Tianle Yao, Wen Cao (npc), Lin Lin (coach)
2015 4th Youth Open Opatija, Croatia; 13 Kids teams	2.	China RDFZ1; Zixi Cai, Yuanzhe Ding, Baozhuo Jiang, Randy Pan, Shi Qiu, Haoqing Yu, Jichao Hu (npc), Tong Jiang (coach)
2015 4th Youth Open Opatija, Croatia; 13 Kids teams	3.	(China) SX XNWY; Hanyang Dai, Yihong Liu, Jiaxin Tong, Ruizhe Wang, Wenjie Xue, Tiancheng Zhang, Qiwei Li (npc), Hui Fu (coach)
2015 4th Youth Open Opatija, Croatia; 13 Kids teams	4.	(China) SX XHEST; Licong Cheng, Ruicheng Mao, Penghao Wang, Zhe Wu, Zhijie Yuan, Yu Yun, Hongqin Xue (npc), Jiacheng He (coach)
2017 5th Youth Open Lyon, France; 17 Juniors teams	1.	(United States) USA; Adam Grossack, Zachary Grossack, Christian Jolly, Adam Kaplan, Kevin Rosenberg (playing captain), Anam Tebha
2017 5th Youth Open Lyon, France; 17 Juniors teams	2.	(Japan) Japan; Takayuki Hino, Eishi Imakiire, Kokoi Kobayashi, Derek Neo, Sanekata Sonoike, Ryoichi Yamada, Hiroark Miura (npc)
2017 5th Youth Open Lyon, France; 17 Juniors teams	3.	Villa Fabbriche; Christian Bakke (Norway), Maximo Crusizio (Argentina), Guillermo Minutti (Uruguay), Shivam Shah (England)
2017 5th Youth Open Lyon, France; 17 Juniors teams	4.	(United States) China RDFZ Synrey; Nian Si (China), Shiyu Sun (China), Hongji Wei (China), Boyuan Xiong (China), Yichen Yin (USA), Yi Zhou (China), Jichao Hu (China) (npc), Tong Jiang (China) (coach)
2017 5th Youth Open Lyon, France; 12 Youngsters teams	1.	(France) France; Raphael Basler, Luc Bellicaud, Arthur Boulin, Melic Dufrene, Maxence Fragola, Theo Guillemin, Christophe Oursel (npc)
2017 5th Youth Open Lyon, France; 12 Youngsters teams	2.	(China) Shengxing Team; Cheng Deng, Yihong Liu, Jiaxin Tong, Zhijie Yuan, Yu Yun, Tiancheng Zhang, Qi Zeng (npc)
2017 5th Youth Open Lyon, France; 12 Youngsters teams	3.	(China) China; Zhiyu Cheng, Baozhuo Jiang, Randy Pan, Shi Qiu, Xihao Wang, Haoqing Yu, Jichao Hu (npc), Bing Du (coach)
2017 5th Youth Open Lyon, France; 12 Youngsters teams	4.	Sweden; Teo Bodin (Sweden), Sanna Clementsson (Sweden), Christian Lahrmann (Denmark), Alexander Sandin (Sweden)
2017 5th Youth Open Lyon, France; 15 Girls teams	1.	(China) Shengxing Team 1 Yunpeng Chen, Chenyun Ge, Yajie Lu, Yijia Lu, Xinyao Ruan, Jiaming Xu, Xiaochen Kong (npc)
2017 5th Youth Open Lyon, France; 15 Girls teams	2.	France 1 Girls; Helene Besancon, Helene Chelin, Sarah Combescure, Marie-Valentine Coupel, Emelin Jounin, Mathilde Thuillez, Wilfried Libbrecht (npc)
2017 5th Youth Open Lyon, France; 15 Girls teams	3.	(China) SH Xin Jiangnan Team; Yueling Gu, Shiyi Li, Shiyun Mao, Yanting Mao, Yici Wang, Xiaotong Wu, Yi Xing Lü (npc)
2017 5th Youth Open Lyon, France; 15 Girls teams	4.	(Chile) Chile; Sofia Gerstmann, Diana Molina, Francisca Nacrur, Valentina Roman, Camila Yanez, Alexandra Cova (npc), Hanoi Rondon (coach)
2017 5th Youth Open Lyon, France; 26 Kids teams	1.	China RDFZ Galaxy; Zhenhao Cai, Jingfan Chen, Yuanzhe Niu, Zhaofeng Wang, Boxin Zhang, Fangchen Zhao, Jichao Hu (npc), Jie Li (coach)
2017 5th Youth Open Lyon, France; 26 Kids teams	2.	(China) Shengxing Venus; Haochen Liu, Yizhou Liu, Mingyu Lu, Ruicheng Mao, Tianle Yao, Zhaochen Yu, Gongjun Liu (npc)
2017 5th Youth Open Lyon, France; 26 Kids teams	3.	(China) Shengxing Saturn; Licong Cheng, Penghao Wang, Ruizhe Wang, Yingwi Wang, Hao Xu, Jiahao Yang, Qin Liu (npc)
2017 5th Youth Open Lyon, France; 26 Kids teams	4.	France Kids; Romain Bloch, Arthur Libbrecht, Leo Rombaut, Clement Teil, Benoit Deveze (npc)
Note that from this point onwards, "Juniors" has become U26, "Youngsters" has become U21, "Girls" has become U26 Women, and "Kids" has become U16
2019 6th Youth Open Opatija, Croatia; 20 U26 teams	1.	(United States) SiVY B Cornelius Duffie, Ben Kristensen, Kevin Rosenberg, Sarah Youngquist
2019 6th Youth Open Opatija, Croatia; 20 U26 teams	2.	(Netherlands) Netherlands; Pim Coppens, Guy Mendes de Leon, Thibo Sprinkhuizen, Niels van Bijsterveldt
2019 6th Youth Open Opatija, Croatia; 20 U26 teams	3.	(England) Natt; Stephen Kennedy, Shahzaad Natt, Ben Norton, Junyuan Ye
2019 6th Youth Open Opatija, Croatia; 20 U26 teams	4.	(Australia) Australia; Renee Cooper, John McMahon, Nicholas Ranson, Matthew Smith, Andrew Spooner, Jamie Thompson, Michael Doecke (npc)
2019 6th Youth Open Opatija, Croatia; 20 U21 teams	1.	(Poland) Poland; Jakub Bazyluk, Krzysztof Cichy, Tomasz Kielbasa, Kacper Kopka, Marek Markowski (npc)
2019 6th Youth Open Opatija, Croatia; 20 U21 teams	2.	Badoell; Erik Hansson (Sweden), Castor Mann (Sweden), Oscar Nijssen (Netherlands), Tim van de Paverd (Netherlands)
2019 6th Youth Open Opatija, Croatia; 20 U21 teams	3.	(United States) The Canadians; Hao Zhen (John) Dong (Canada), Finn Kolesnik (USA), Harrison Anders Luba (USA), Bo Han Zhu (Canada)
2019 6th Youth Open Opatija, Croatia; 20 U21 teams	4.	Meister's Disciple; Ilai Ilan Baniri (Israel), Soren Bune (Denmark), Sanna Clementsson (Sweden), Christian Lahrmann (Denmark), Alexander Sandin (Sweden)
2019 6th Youth Open Opatija, Croatia; 10 U26 Women teams	1.	(China) SXPEONY; Yunpeng Chen, Chenyun Ge, Yijia Lu, Xinyao Ruan, Jiaming Xu, Wenfei Yu, Ling Wang (npc)
2019 6th Youth Open Opatija, Croatia; 10 U26 Women teams	2.	(Netherlands) (England) Screwdriver; Malene Holm Christensen, Laura Covill, Esther Visser, Janneke Wackwitz, Bas van Engelen (npc)
2019 6th Youth Open Opatija, Croatia; 10 U26 Women teams	3.	(Norway) Sofie's World; Thea Lucia Indrebo, Agnethe Hansen Kjensli, Ida Marie Oeberg, Sofie Grasholt Sjodal
2019 6th Youth Open Opatija, Croatia; 10 U26 Women teams	4.	Poland Girls; Sophia Baldysz, Joanna Kokot, Dominika Ocylok, Joanna Zalewska
2019 6th Youth Open Opatija, Croatia; 15 U16 teams	1.	(China) SXMARS; Yanzhuo Fu, Zhuxiongjie Gao, Ningyu Lang, Haotian Shen, Zicheng Wang, Fanfei Yu, Wei Yang (npc), Yihong Liu (coach)
2019 6th Youth Open Opatija, Croatia; 15 U16 teams	2.	(Poland) Poland; Lucja Ciborowska, Konrad Ciborowski, Lukasz Kasperczyk, Kacper Kuflowski, Franciszek Kurlit, Michal Stasik, Marcin Kuflowski (npc)
2019 6th Youth Open Opatija, Croatia; 15 U16 teams	3.	(China) SXSATURN; Suhang Li, Zhenyue Lu, Tengbo Tang, Zhixian Tian, Yijin Wu, Xuyang Zhang, Hongfeng Zhu (npc), Zhijie Yuan (coach)
2019 6th Youth Open Opatija, Croatia; 15 U16 teams	4.	(China) SXVENUS; Haoxuan Jiang, Fengming Lin, Shuoming Ma, Jiarui Wang, Zimo Xie, Junyi Yang, Lin Lin (npc), Cheng Deng (coach)
From 2022 onwards, the World Youth Open Championships was rebranded to the World Youth Transnational Championships
2022 7th Youth Transnationals Salsamaggiore, Italy; 17 U26 teams	1.	(United States) USA U26; Zachary Grossack, Finn Kolesnik, Harrison Anders Luba, Kevin Rosenberg, Michael Xu, Bo Han Zhu
2022 7th Youth Transnationals Salsamaggiore, Italy; 17 U26 teams	2.	(Canada) (Israel) (Netherlands) (United States) Bridgenoobs; Jacob Freeman, Nir Khutorsky, Sibrand van Oosten, Aviv Zeitak, Alex Kolesnik (npc)
2022 7th Youth Transnationals Salsamaggiore, Italy; 17 U26 teams	3.	Italy U26 Green; Giovanni Donati, Alvaro Gaiotti, Gabriele Giubilo, Sebastiano Scata, Valerio Giubilo (npc), Dario Attanasio (coach)
2022 7th Youth Transnationals Salsamaggiore, Italy; 17 U26 teams	4.	(Sweden) Bridgestars; Sanna Clementsson, Erik Hansson (playing captain), Castor Mann, Alexander Sandin
2022 7th Youth Transnationals Salsamaggiore, Italy; 21 U21 teams	1.	Daddy Lahrmann; Andreas Abragi (Sweden), Nicolai Heiberg-Evenstad (Norway), Christian Lahrmann (Denmark) (playing captain), Leo Rombaut (France), Jerome Rombaut (France) (coach)
2022 7th Youth Transnationals Salsamaggiore, Italy; 21 U21 teams	2.	(Poland) CKIS Skawina U18; Wojciech Bak, Kacper Kuflowski, Franciszek Kurlit, Michal Stasik, Marcin Kuflowski (npc)
2022 7th Youth Transnationals Salsamaggiore, Italy; 21 U21 teams	3.	(Poland) Dabrowka WZBS Poznan; Wiktor Chalupniczak, Szymon Gras, Jakub Nawrocki, Jakub Pilat
2022 7th Youth Transnationals Salsamaggiore, Italy; 21 U21 teams	4.	Chinese Taipei U21; Cian-Han Chen, Ya Hsuan Huang, Xuan-da Lin, Liang Yu Syu, Pin Yao Syu, Ruo xin Wu, Hong-Ren Wu (npc, coach)
2022 7th Youth Transnationals Salsamaggiore, Italy; 6 U26 Women teams	1.	Norway Girls; Kaja Brekke, Thea Lucia Indrebo, Agnethe Hansen Kjensli, Mia Eline Statle
2022 7th Youth Transnationals Salsamaggiore, Italy; 6 U26 Women teams	2.	Italy U26W Green; Sophia Capobianco, Eleonora Dalpozzo, Federica Dalpozzo, Valentina Dalpozzo, Dario Attanasio (npc), Valerio Giubilo (coach)
2022 7th Youth Transnationals Salsamaggiore, Italy; 6 U26 Women teams	3.	Italy U26W White; Cristina Brusotti, Zaira Davide, Annachiara Pelaggi, Maddalena Pelaggi, Dario Attanasio (npc), Valerio Giubilo (coach)
2022 7th Youth Transnationals Salsamaggiore, Italy; 6 U26 Women teams	4.	India U26G; Kalpana Baliram Gurjar, Subhashree Basu, Rekha Bhimanaik, Vidhya Patel, Bindiya Naidoo (npc), Vinay Desai (coach) (India)
2022 7th Youth Transnationals Salsamaggiore, Italy; 11 U16 teams	1.	Blitz; Albert Pedmanson (Estonia), Jasper Vahk (Estonia), Darwin Li (Canada), Anshul Bhatt (India) (playing captain)
2022 7th Youth Transnationals Salsamaggiore, Italy; 11 U16 teams	2.	(United States) USS Unsinkable; Andrew Chen, Brian Zhang (playing captain), Charlie Chen, Eric Xiao, Jeff Xiao, Kayden Ge, Qiang Zhang (coach)
2022 7th Youth Transnationals Salsamaggiore, Italy; 11 U16 teams	3.	(Poland) CKIS Skawina U15; Aleks Bukat, Kacper Kisielewski, Milena Klimiuk, Jan Trojak, Marcin Kuflowski (npc)
2022 7th Youth Transnationals Salsamaggiore, Italy; 11 U16 teams	4.	(Poland) CKIS Skawina U12; Ignacy Kotewicz, Jakub Michalski, Franciszek Stezala, Antoni Wojtowicz, Marcin Kuflowski (npc)
2022 7th Youth Transnationals Salsamaggiore, Italy; 6 U31 teams	1.	(Sweden) Sweece; Dimitrios Konstantinos Balokas (Greece), Alessandra Calmanovici (Switzerland), Ioannis Oikonomopoulos (Greece) (playing captain), Jeremie Stoeckli (Switzerland)
2022 7th Youth Transnationals Salsamaggiore, Italy; 6 U31 teams	2.	(Finland) Finland; Hermanni Huhtamaki, Oskari Koivu, Maria Myllaeri, Ilona Vanni
2022 7th Youth Transnationals Salsamaggiore, Italy; 6 U31 teams	3.	(Poland) Agnieszkas Angels; Jakub Bazyluk, Krzystof Cichy, Tomasz Kielbasa, Kacper Kopka, Patryk Patreuha
2022 7th Youth Transnationals Salsamaggiore, Italy; 6 U31 teams	4.	India U31; Surajit Bar, Arya Chakraborty, Shouvik Das, Soumadeep Ghosh, Sayantan Kushari, Sagnik Roy, Anand Keshav Sakharam Samant (npc, coach)
Note: from 2024 onwards, the format of the Transnational Teams changed the format of the final from a knockout to a round robin.
2024 8th Youth Transnationals Wroclaw, Poland; 19 U26 teams	1.	(Greece) Hellas U26; Dimitrios Kapiris, Iasonas-iraklis Papaspyrou, Panagiotis Skordas, Michail Soumplis, Marilena Bompolaki (npc)
2024 8th Youth Transnationals Wroclaw, Poland; 19 U26 teams	2.	(Netherlands) Skaffatar; Xavier Friesen, Ronald Goor, Oscar Nijssen (playing captain), Tim van de Paverd
2024 8th Youth Transnationals Wroclaw, Poland; 19 U26 teams	3.	France U26; Luc Bellicaud, Maxence Fragola, Romaric Guth, Nao Tabata
2024 8th Youth Transnationals Wroclaw, Poland; 19 U26 teams	4.	(United States) Team Funbridge Blue; Andreas Abragi (Sweden), Nicolai Heiberg-Evenstad (Norway), Finn Kolesnik (USA), Christian Lahrmann (Denmark) (playing captain), Jakub Patreuha (Poland), Leo Rombaut (France), Jerome Rombaut (France) (coach)
2024 8th Youth Transnationals Wroclaw, Poland; 29 U21 teams	1.	(Israel) Bridgechamp; Ido Moskovitz, Daniel Msika, Lia Petelko (playing captain), Koren Retter
2024 8th Youth Transnationals Wroclaw, Poland; 29 U21 teams	2.	Poland U21; Wojciech Bak, Jakub Bereza, Kacper Kuflowski, Bernard Kula, Franciszek Kurlit, Wojciech Okrzesik, Michael Wrobel (npc)
2024 8th Youth Transnationals Wroclaw, Poland; 29 U21 teams	3.	(United States) RDFZ B Hanxi Ma (China), Ziao Wang (China), Bruce Wu (China), Yuekai Yang (China), Brian Zhang (USA), Feng Zhu (China), Yinghao Liu (China) (npc), Jichao Hu (China) (coach)
2024 8th Youth Transnationals Wroclaw, Poland; 29 U21 teams	4.	(Poland) Blue Wratislavia; Maciej Betlinski, Alex Cimr, Lukasz Kasperczyk, Krzysztof Swiatkowski
2024 8th Youth Transnationals Wroclaw, Poland; 10 U26 Women teams	1.	Poland 1 Ewa Bagrowska, Matylda Brzyzka, Dominika Lucka, Ewa Morawska, Maria Niklaus, Natalia Suszanowicz, Rafal Marks (npc)
2024 8th Youth Transnationals Wroclaw, Poland; 10 U26 Women teams	2.	France U26W; Constance Belloy, Margaux Kurek Beaulieu, Elise Nugues, Wilhelmine Schlumberger, Wilfried Libbrecht (npc)
2024 8th Youth Transnationals Wroclaw, Poland; 10 U26 Women teams	3.	Poland 2 Wiktoria Forys, Natalia Frechowicz, Milena Gryzlo, Magdalena Kapala, Kaja Pustulka, Maja Trojanska, Rafal Marks (npc)
2024 8th Youth Transnationals Wroclaw, Poland; 10 U26 Women teams	4.	(Australia) Australia; Zara Chowdhury, Anne Davey, Kate MacDonald, Lauren Morgan, Diya Shah, Jasmine Skeate, Lauren Travis (npc), Rajiv Shah (coach)
2024 8th Youth Transnationals Wroclaw, Poland; 30 U16 teams	1.	(United States) Jack; Jeff Xiao, Andrew Chen, Charlie Chen (playing captain), Kyo Chen, Steve Chen (coach)
2024 8th Youth Transnationals Wroclaw, Poland; 30 U16 teams	2.	The Vikings; Filip Asplund Sivelind (Sweden), Sebastian Lillejord (Norway), Markus Hansen Moe (Norway), Matteo Nordqvist (Sweden)
2024 8th Youth Transnationals Wroclaw, Poland; 30 U16 teams	3.	(Chinese Taipei) CT U16; Yino Chang, Hsin-Wei Chiu, Ying-Hsuan Huang, Zi-Ming Lai, Chun-Po Lu, Yu-Chen Peng
2024 8th Youth Transnationals Wroclaw, Poland; 30 U16 teams	4.	(Chinese Taipei) CT 360; Keng-Jui Chang, Tzu-Wei Chen, Chin-Yu Wu, Lung-Hsuan Wu, Hsiang-Yun Chen (npc)
2024 8th Youth Transnationals Wroclaw, Poland; 16 U31 teams	1.	France U31; Raphael Basler, Pierre Bedouet, Louis Bonin, Colin Deheeger, Thomas Guichet, Estaban Vallet
2024 8th Youth Transnationals Wroclaw, Poland; 16 U31 teams	2.	ZG HC; Matko Ferenca (Croatia) (playing captain), Filip Katusic (Croatia), Selena Pepic (Serbia), Jovana Zoranovic (Serbia)
2024 8th Youth Transnationals Wroclaw, Poland; 16 U31 teams	3.	(Poland) Polish Dodos; Jakub Andruszkiewicz (playing captain), Karol Konopko, Konrad Majewski, Konrad Paluszek, Lukasz Trendak
2024 8th Youth Transnationals Wroclaw, Poland; 16 U31 teams	4.	(Poland) Ania; Bartosz Bejenka, Roman Madej, Adam Pigulski (playing captain), Anna Zareba
2026 9th Youth Transnationals Hefei, China; 22 U26 teams	1.	(United States) Yucai Inter Bridge; Nikolaj Hammelev (Denmark), Christian Lahrmann (Denmark), Ofek Sabbah (Israel), Yonatan Sliwowicz (Israel), Yuxiang Liu (Netherlands), Jackson Zhou (USA)
2026 9th Youth Transnationals Hefei, China; 22 U26 teams	2.	(United States) Reignwood Juniors; Baozhuo Jiang (China), Brian Zhang (USA), Ziao Wang (China), Hanxi Ma (China), Ligang Zhang (npc), Qiang Zhang (coach)
2026 9th Youth Transnationals Hefei, China; 22 U26 teams	3.	(Greece) Hellas U26; Alexandros Panormitis Gryllis, Dimitrios Kapiris, Iasonas-iraklis Papaspyrou, Michail Soumplis
2026 9th Youth Transnationals Hefei, China; 22 U26 teams	4.	(China) Beijing U26; Jingfan Chen, Yuanzhe Niu, Zhongtian Wang, Haoqing Yu, Jianze Li (npc), Jing Liu (coach)
2026 9th Youth Transnationals Hefei, China; 34 U21 teams	1.	(England) The Deuces; Nicolai Heinberg-Evenstad (Norway), Wojciech Bak (Poland), Makysmilian Blicharz (Poland), Jakub Michalski (Poland), Grzegorz Blicharz (npc)
2026 9th Youth Transnationals Hefei, China; 34 U21 teams	2.	China RDFZ BAXI; Yizheng Ge, Che Han, Xincheng Lyu, Hanting Wang, Yuekai Yang, Zixuan Yuan, Jichao Hu (npc), Bing Du (coach)
2026 9th Youth Transnationals Hefei, China; 34 U21 teams	3.	(Hong Kong) HKG Youngsters; Ka Yan Chan, Ka Yau Chan, Spencer Chan, Jeffrey Chiang, Dave Ko, Arian Shek, Sam Tseng (npc, coach)
2026 9th Youth Transnationals Hefei, China; 34 U21 teams	4.	(China) NT TTAOQI; Yincheng Chen, Ruiqi Hong, Fengming Lin, Jiachen Wang, Yijun Wu, Wei Chen Yin, Jiong Chen (npc), Xiaoping Liu (coach)
2026 9th Youth Transnationals Hefei, China; 24 U26 Women teams	1.	(Japan) Japan; Iroha Heffernan, Marin Hirono, Yuka Inamura, Saki Mizobe, Miharu Wada, Nana Yamazaki, Takayuki Hino (coach)
2026 9th Youth Transnationals Hefei, China; 24 U26 Women teams	2.	(Poland) Poland; Milena Gryzlo, Magdalena Kapala, Dominika Lucka (playing captain), Natalia Suszanowicz, Rafal Marks (coach)
2026 9th Youth Transnationals Hefei, China; 24 U26 Women teams	3.	(China) Shandong Yantai; Tianxin Chi, Can Ge, Ruohan Liu, Yixuan Liu, Ruo Fei Ma (playing captain), Xi Han Zhang, Jian Min Zhang (coach)
2026 9th Youth Transnationals Hefei, China; 24 U26 Women teams	4.	(China) Changning Shanghai; Xi Chen, Yixuan Jiang, Lingyun Teng, Aijia Wang, Tong Xu, Lingyi Yang, Yi Xing Lü (npc), Zhenhuan Gu (coach)
2026 9th Youth Transnationals Hefei, China; 98 U16 teams	1.	NT TTAOQI; Ruiqing (Rachel) Cai (Australia), Yanhua Hu (China), Yanjia Hu (China), Yichen Luo (China), Xinhao Wu (China), Xuze Xu (China), Xiaoping Liu (China) (npc, coach)
2026 9th Youth Transnationals Hefei, China; 98 U16 teams	2.	(Poland) Wizards from Warsaw; Michal Adamczak, Artur Kochanowski, Blazej Mroz. Krzysztof Turant, Wojciech Mroz (npc), Piotr Dybixz (coach)
2026 9th Youth Transnationals Hefei, China; 98 U16 teams	3.	(China) Shanghai NTBC Tank; Zimo Chen, Cheng Lin, Di Wang, Chenyang Xiong, Yuchen Ye, Yuran Zhang, Bin Shi (npc, coach)
2026 9th Youth Transnationals Hefei, China; 98 U16 teams	4.	(China) Shanghai Weiyu; Haoze Chen, Yezhen Ji, Yuchen Song, Jinhe Xu, Xize Yu, Mingyang Zheng, Wei Han (npc), Jianzhong Yang (coach)
2026 9th Youth Transnationals Hefei, China; 98 U16 teams	1.	(China) Agoofans; Xuanting He, Ziyu Li (playing captain), Yufan Liao, Pengqiao Qu, Wei Wang, Enzong Wu, Xingsi Ren (coach)
2026 9th Youth Transnationals Hefei, China; 98 U16 teams	2.	China U31; Jiawen Gu, Jixiao Han, Haochen Liu, Zian Wang, Tianyao Yan, Tianyu Zhang, Ligang Zhang (npc), Xiangdong Bao (coach)
2026 9th Youth Transnationals Hefei, China; 98 U16 teams	3.	(India) India; Shubham Acharya, Surajit Bar, Anshul Bhatt, Sayantan Kushari, Vidhya Patel, Sagnik Roy, Kaustubh Bendre (npc, coach)
2026 9th Youth Transnationals Hefei, China; 98 U16 teams	4.	(China) SHQY; Wenyi Cheng, Chentian Gu, Sijia Gu, Ningyu Lang, Yining Shen, Zuosheng Shi, Xueming Fu (npc), Bing Zhao (coach)

World Championships & Events (double overview). World Bridge Federation.
World Youth Congress. World Bridge Federation.

The World Youth Congress (to conclude 29 August 2011) will include "world championships" for teams, pairs, and individuals, each with Juniors and Youngsters flights if the number of u-21 entries is sufficient. There will also be secondary contests with alternative forms of scoring, board-a-match teams and IMP pairs(*).

Some of these events may officially continue "world championships" for junior players contested before 2009: miscellaneous ones, not those now held in even-number years: biennial (zonal) World Youth Teams Championships and quadrennial World Bridge Games.

For the World Bridge Games, among 96 junior pairs in the final and 30 in the consolation, the WBF lists 124 co-national pairs, one England–Wales (because the Olympic movement recognizes Great Britain teams?), and one Argentina–Chile (why?).

The 2011 events for teams and pairs will be transnational in that entries may comprise players from different countries and open in that there is no preliminary qualification at zonal level.

Here is a list of pertinent past championships.

Teams

2009 only(*), World Juniors Teams Championship to Date (Board-a-match), World Youth Congress. WBF.
2009 only, World Juniors Teams Championship to Date (Swiss), World Youth Congress. WBF.
2002 only, junior flight of the IOC Grand Prix

Pairs

2009 only(*), World Juniors IMP Pairs Championships to Date (IMPs), World Youth Congress. WBF.
2006 only, youngsters pairs World Youngsters Pairs Championship to Date, World Youth Congress. WBF.
1995-2009, every two/three years World Juniors MP Pairs Championships to Date (matchpoints), World Youth Congress. WBF.

Individuals

2000 only, junior flight of the World Masters Individual Championships, World Masters Individual. WBF.
2004 only, World Juniors Individual Championship to Date, World Youth Congress. WBF.

== University students ==
"under the auspices of the FISU".World University Team Cup. WBF.

Teams comprise university student players from one nation, not one university.(2010 conditions)

Europe 1993 to 2001 (worldwide in 2000 and 2001)

1992 Antwerp World University Chess Championship, Lode Lambeets attended and initiated the same for bridge (2002)
1993 Antwerp, EBL President Paul Magerman
1994 DEN (2002)
1995
1996 NED (2008)
1997 NED
1998 DEN
1999 NED
Hagen of Denmark 2002 "He began in Palermo in 1997 and missed only the 1999 edition when he preferred to take part in the Junior World Championships being held in Florida at the same time." (2002)
2000
2001 NED

2005 NOR

2000 0826-0902 Maastricht, Netherlands

Bridge Olympiades (11th Olympiad)
1st World University Teams Bridge Cup (conditions): "Players must be students of a recognized University, between 17 and 28 years of age. Each country may enter one representative team."

24 entries; Austria, Italy, Denmark
Europe (16): 123456789 579 0234
21! rounds, first 7 of 14 days
Romania and Turkey listed 23/24 at WBFdatabase did not participate

2002 08 04/13 Bruges, Belgium

EBL from 199x, worldwide 2000, FISU 2002

13 entries: Denmark [1994, 1998], Italy, Netherlands [four recent]
Denmark, Italy, Netherlands, Poland
Europe (11): 12345689 11 12 13

2004 1031/1106 Istanbul, Turkey

alongside 12th Olympiad

15 entries; Poland, Belgium, USA
VP 284 276 247
Europe (12): 124689 012345
17 to 27 at beginning of year (may turn 28)
Anti-Doping, Open and Women only

2006 10-21/26 Tianjin, China

27 entries; China A, USA, Poland B;
Europe (16): 2345678 123578 026
champion, Tianjin Normal University
contenders CHN 25:5 USA, USA 17:13 POL, POL 22:8 CHN
VP 508 492 472

2008 09 03/08 Łódź, Poland

21 entries; Netherlands A, Poland A, Norway A

first European (EUC) 1993 Antwerp, initiator Paul Magerman, son Geert M is now technical delegate FISU

Netherlands EUC champion 1996,97,99,01
Netherlands runaway Marion Michielsen–Meike Wortel, Bob Drijver–Merijn Groenenboom, Danny Molenaar–Tim Verbeek.
three Bulletins only, evidently days 1 to 3

Europe:

2010 08-02/09 Kaohsiung, Taiwan

organized by FISU and the Chinese Taipei University Sports Federation (CTUSF); supervised and assisted by other Chinese Taipei bodies; conducted under WBF technical rules
round-robin teams-of-four; as many as two teams per nation, six players per team
citizens born 1982—1992 (up to 28 during calendar 2010)
current student registered in degree program or completed degree program preceding year
"For the purpose of opening and closing ceremonies, the participating delegations are requested to bring with them 2 national/regional flags (96 x 144cm) as duly registered with FISU."
14 entries; Poland, France, Israel

Poland in a runaway (11-1-1, average 21.3+ VP!); by IMPs the three Poland pairs ranked 1-2, 3-4 and 15-16 among all 73 participating players
USA B fourth but slaughtered by Poland, France, Israel (18 total; average 21 in other matches; 8-4-1)

Poland winner +31 VP before final round!

POL 276 FRA 238 ISR 232
Europe (6): 12359 14

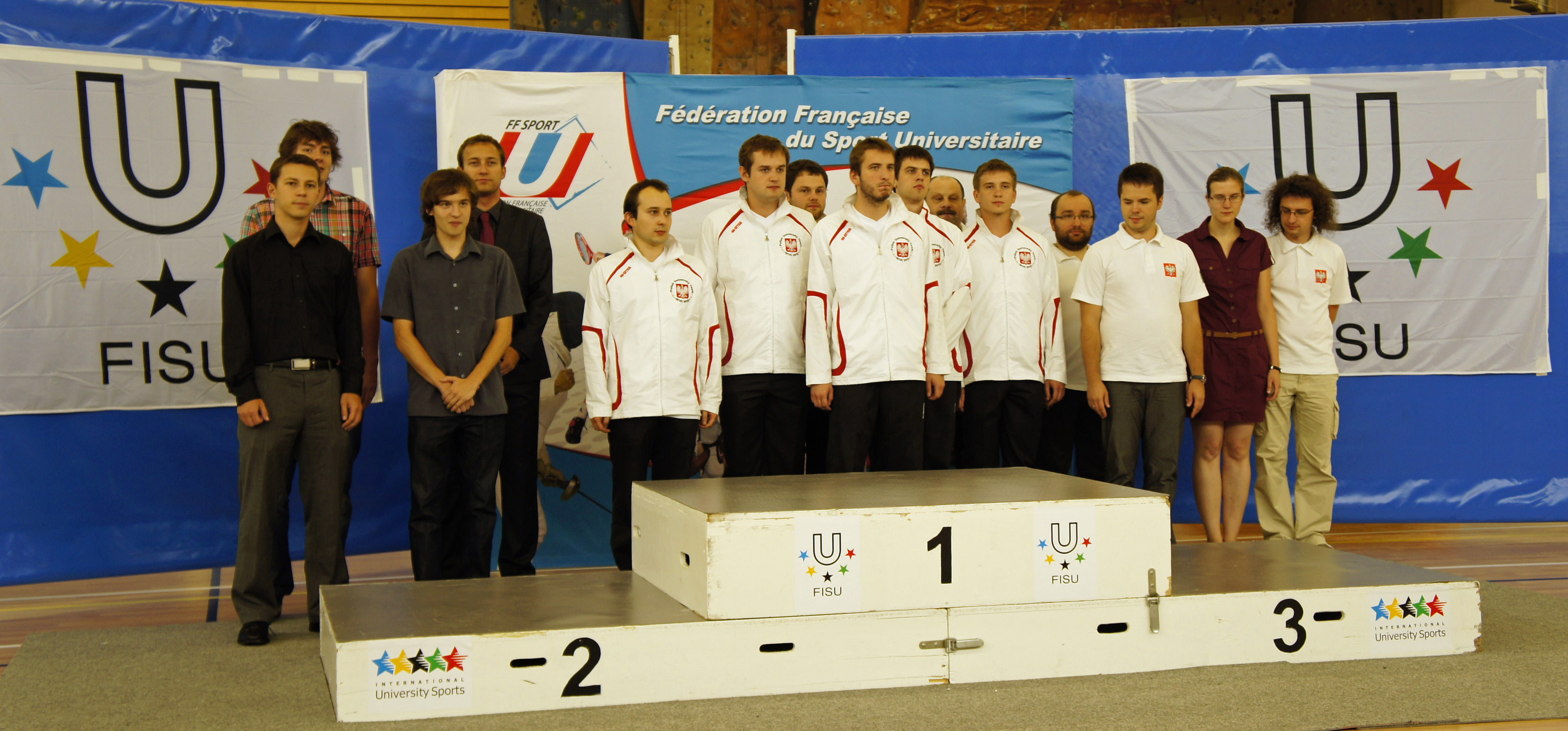
1 Poland, 2 Tcheck, 3 Poland

2012 07-10/15 Reims, France

Year	n	Champion	Runners up
2000 Maastricht	24 teams	Austria; Andreas Gloyer, Arno Lindermann, Bernd Saurer, Martin Schifko	ITA; DEN NED
2002 Bruges	13	Denmark; Michael Askgaard, Gregers Bjanarson, Anders Hagen, Kasper Konow,	ITA; NED POL
2004 Istanbul	15	Poland; Krzysztof BURAS, Jacek KALITA, Krzysztof KOTOROWICZ, Piotr MADRY, Grzegorz NARKIEWICZ, Wojciech STRZEMECKI	BEL; USA TUR
2006 Tianjin	27	China A Jing Jin, Xin Li, Jing Liu, Shu Liu, Yan Liu, Yan Wwang	USA; POLb SWE
2008 Łódź	21	Netherlands A Marion Michielsen–Meike Wortel, Bob Drijver–Merijn Groenenboom, Danny Molenaar–Tim Verbeek	POLa; NORa POLb
2010 Kaohsiung	14	Poland; Wojciech GAWEL, Jacek KALITA, Michal NOWOSADZKI, Jan SIKORA, Piotr WIANKOWSKI, Piotr ZATORSKI	FRA; ISR USA
2012 July 10–15, Reims, France	18	Poland	

== See also ==
- Bridge at the 1st World Mind Sports Games
- World Junior Pairs Championship
