= 2017–18 EBU Player of the Year Championship =

Tournament information
- Sport: Bridge
- Dates: October 2017–September 2018
- Administrator: English Bridge Union

Final positions
- Champion: Mike Bell

The 2017–18 EBU Player of the Year Championship was the competition's fourth season. Points were accumulated over the EBU's ten most prestigious events from 1 October 2017 to 30 September 2018. Mike Bell won his first title, becoming the fourth player to win the championship.

== List of competitions ==
Event	Format	Dates	Points							
Event	Format	Dates	1st	2nd	3rd	4th	5th	6th	7th	8th
Gold Cup	Single-Elimination Teams	—	16	8	4		1			
Spring Fours	Double-Elimination Teams	4 May – 8 May 2018	14	8	4		1			–
Premier League (Division 1)	Triple Round-Robin Teams	15 September – 4 November 2017	16	8	4	2	–			
Crockfords Cup	Single-Elimination Teams with Finals	—	12	6	4	2	1	1	1	1
Four Star Teams	Swiss Teams with Finals	17 August – 19 August 2018	8	4	2	1	–			
National Point-a-Board Teams	PaB Teams – Qualifier and Finals	20 January – 21 January 2018	6	3	2	1	–			
Summer Festival Swiss Pairs	Swiss Pairs	3 August – 5 August 2018	12	6	3	2	1	–		
National Pairs	Regional and National Matchpoint Pairs	18 March & 14 – 15 April 2018	8	4	2	1	–			
Guardian Trophy	Matchpoint Pairs	30 – 31 March 2018	6	3	2	1	–			
Two Star Pairs	Swiss Pairs with Matchpoint Finals	19 – 20 October 2017	6	3	2	1	–			

== Results ==
Place	Name	Event										Total
Place	Name	GC	SF	PL	CC	FST	PaB	SMSP	NP	GT	TSP	Total
1st place, gold medalist(s)	Mike Bell	4	**14**	**16**			3					**37**
2	Alexander Allfrey	4	**14**	**16**								**34**
2	Tony Forrester	4	**14**	**16**								**34**
2	David Gold	4	**14**	**16**								**34**
2	Andrew Robson	4	**14**	**16**								**34**
6	Graham Osborne		**14**	**16**						3		**33**
7	Chris Jagger		1	8	**12**			4.5		2		**27.5**
8	Tom Townsend			4	6	**8**	**6**					**24**
9	Gunnar Hallberg	**16**		2	1	3						**22**
9	Phil King	**16**		2	1	3						**22**
9	Andrew McIntosh	**16**		2	1	3						**22**
9	Derek Patterson	**16**		2	1	3						**22**

This list displays the top ten players (including ties); 130 players received points. Winners of each event are highlighted in bold.
