= 2019–20 EBU Player of the Year Championship =

Tournament information
- Sport: Bridge
- Dates: October 2019–September 2020
- Administrator: English Bridge Union

The 2019–20 EBU Player of the Year Championship was the competition's sixth season. As per previous years, points were set to be accumulated over the EBU's ten most prestigious events from 1 October 2019 to 30 September 2020; However, COVID-19 led to the delay or cancellation of several events (as detailed below), leading to the season being declared incomplete.

== List of competitions ==
Event	Format	Dates	Points							
Event	Format	Dates	1st	2nd	3rd	4th	5th	6th	7th	8th
Gold Cup	Single-Elimination Teams	—N/a	16	8	4		1			
Spring Fours	Double-Elimination Teams	Cancelled due to COVID-19	14	8	4		1			–
Premier League (Division 1)	Triple Round-Robin Teams	5 October – 10 November 2019	16	8	4	2	–			
Crockfords Cup	Single-Elimination Teams with Finals	Finals delayed due to COVID-19	12	6	4	2	1	1	1	1
Four Star Teams	Swiss Teams with Finals	Cancelled due to COVID-19	8	4	2	1	–			
National Point-a-Board Teams	Round-Robin PaB Teams	25–26 January 2020	6	3	2	1	–			
Summer Meeting Swiss Pairs	Swiss Pairs	Cancelled due to COVID-19	12	6	3	2	1	–		
National Pairs	Regional and National Matchpoint Pairs	Final cancelled due to COVID-19	8	4	2	1	–			
Guardian Trophy	Matchpoint Pairs	Cancelled due to COVID-19	6	3	2	1	–			
Two Star Pairs	Swiss Pairs with Matchpoint Finals	18–19 October 2019	6	3	2	1	–			

== Results ==
Standings after four events are shown below. Due to COVID-19, the season was declared incomplete with no winner. It is unknown as to whether the Crockfords Cup finals, set to take place in September 2021, will contribute to these unofficial results.

Place	Name	Event										Total
Place	Name	GC	SF	PL	CC	FST	PaB	SMSP	NP	GT	TSP	Total
1	David Gold	**16**	NH	8	NH	NH	1	NH	NH	NH		**25**
2	Espen Erichsen	8	NH	**16**	NH	NH		NH	NH	NH		**24**
2	Glynn Liggins	8	NH	**16**	NH	NH		NH	NH	NH		**24**
4	Graham Osborne	**16**	NH	2	NH	NH		NH	NH	NH	3	**21**
5	Mike Bell	**16**	NH		NH	NH		NH	NH	NH	2	**18**
6	Alexander Allfrey	**16**	NH		NH	NH		NH	NH	NH		**16**
6	Tony Forrester	**16**	NH		NH	NH		NH	NH	NH		**16**
6	Andrew Robson	**16**	NH		NH	NH		NH	NH	NH		**16**
6	David Bakhshi		NH	**16**	NH	NH		NH	NH	NH		**16**
6	Janet de Botton		NH	**16**	NH	NH		NH	NH	NH		**16**
6	Artur Malinowski		NH	**16**	NH	NH		NH	NH	NH		**16**
6	Tom Townsend		NH	**16**	NH	NH		NH	NH	NH		**16**

This list displays the top ten players (including ties); 74 players received points. Winners of each event are highlighted in bold. NH indicates Not Held.
