= 2016–17 EBU Player of the Year Championship =

Tournament information
- Sport: Bridge
- Dates: October 2016–September 2017
- Administrator: English Bridge Union

Final positions
- Champions: Alexander Allfrey; Andrew Robson

The 2016–17 EBU Player of the Year Championship was the competition's third season. Points were accumulated over the EBU's ten most prestigious events from 1 October 2016 to 30 September 2017. Alexander Allfrey and Andrew Robson won for the second successive year, becoming the first players to win the title more than once.

== List of competitions ==
Event	Format	Dates	Points							
Event	Format	Dates	1st	2nd	3rd	4th	5th	6th	7th	8th
Gold Cup	Single-Elimination Teams	—	16	8	4		1			
Spring Fours	Double-Elimination Teams	28 April – 2 May 2017	14	8	4		1			–
Premier League (Division 1)	Triple Round-Robin Teams	22 October – 6 November 2016	16	8	4	2	–			
Crockfords Cup	Single-Elimination Teams with Finals	—	12	6	4	2	1	1	1	1
Four Star Teams	Swiss Teams with Finals	11 August – 13 August 2017	8	4	2	1	–			
National Point-a-Board Teams	PaB Teams – Qualifier and Finals	21 January – 22 January 2017	6	3	2	1	–			
Summer Meeting Swiss Pairs	Swiss Pairs	4 August – 6 August 2017	12	6	3	2	1	–		
National Pairs	Regional and National Matchpoint Pairs	12 March & 8 – 9 April 2017	8	4	2	1	–			
Guardian Trophy	Matchpoint Pairs	14 – 15 April 2017	6	3	2	1	–			
Two Star Pairs	Swiss Pairs with Matchpoint Finals	14 – 15 October 2016	6	3	2	1	–			

== Results ==
Place	Name	Event										Total
Place	Name	GC	SF	PL	CC	FST	PaB	SMSP	NP	GT	TSP	Total
1st place, gold medalist(s)	Alexander Allfrey	4	**14**	**16**				**12**				**46**
1st place, gold medalist(s)	Andrew Robson	4	**14**	**16**				**12**				**46**
3	Mike Bell	4	**14**	**16**		**8**						**42**
4	David Bakhshi	4	**14**	**16**		1				**6**		**41**
5	Tony Forrester	4	**14**	**16**								**34**
5	David Gold	4	**14**	**16**								**34**
7	Zia Mahmood	**16**	4		**12**							**32**
8	Tom Hanlon	**16**	8		6							**30**
9	Boye Brogeland	**16**	8									**24**
10	Espen Erichsen	**16**		1								**17**
10	Chris Jagger			8	3		**6**					**17**

This list displays the top ten players (including ties); 126 players received points. Winners of each event are highlighted in bold.
