= 2014–15 EBU Player of the Year Championship =

Tournament information
- Sport: Bridge
- Dates: October 2014–September 2015
- Administrator: English Bridge Union

Final positions
- Champion: David Gold

The 2014–15 EBU Player of the Year Championship was the competition's first season. Points were accumulated over the EBU's ten most prestigious events from 1 October 2014 to 30 September 2015. David Gold became the inaugural champion.

== List of competitions ==
Event	Format	Dates	Points							
Event	Format	Dates	1st	2nd	3rd	4th	5th	6th	7th	8th
Gold Cup	Single-Elimination Teams	—	16	8	4		1			
Spring Fours	Double-Elimination Teams	1–5 May 2015	14	8	4		1			–
Premier League (Division 1)	Triple Round-Robin Teams	20 September – 9 November 2014	16	8	4	2	–			
Crockfords Cup	Single-Elimination Teams with Finals	—	12	6	4	2	1	1	1	1
Four Star Teams	Swiss Teams with Finals	21–23 August 2015	8	4	2	1	–			
National Point-a-Board Teams	PaB Teams – Qualifier and Finals	17–18 January 2015	6	3	2	1	–			
Summer Meeting Swiss Pairs	Swiss Pairs	14–16 August 2015	12	6	3	2	1	–		
National Pairs	Regional and National Matchpoint Pairs	15 March & 18 – 19 April 2015	8	4	2	1	–			
Guardian Trophy	Matchpoint Pairs	3 – 4 April 2015	6	3	2	1	–			
Two Star Pairs	Swiss Pairs with Matchpoint Finals	17 – 18 October 2014	6	3	2	1	–			

== Results ==
Place	Name	Event										Total
Place	Name	GC	SF	PL	CC	FST	PaB	SMSP	NP	GT	TSP	Total
1st place, gold medalist(s)	David Gold	**16**	4	**16**	6		**6**	1				**49**
2	Alexander Allfrey	**16**	4	**16**	6							**42**
2	David Bakhshi	**16**	4	**16**	6							**42**
2	Tony Forrester	**16**	4	**16**	6							**42**
2	Andrew Robson	**16**	4	**16**	6							**42**
6	Andrew McIntosh	8		**16**	6							**30**
7	Jeffrey Allerton		**14**			**8**	2					**24**
7	Frances Hinden		**14**			**8**	2					**24**
7	Graham Osborne		**14**			**8**	2					**24**
10	Alex Hydes		4		**12**						6	**22**

This list displays the top ten players; 134 players received points. Winners of each event are highlighted in bold.

== Full results ==
Results tables for each event extend only to those pairs or teams that receive championship points, or to the top 10 (including ties) of the field if appropriate.

=== Gold Cup ===
16 points were awarded to the champions, 8 to the runners-up, 4 to semi-finalists and 1 to quarter-finalists. Home/away draws and IMP scores for each side were not recorded; By convention, team names are based on the full name of the captain.

Quarter-finals
**Jim Mason**	**43**
Janet de Botton	–
**Alexander Allfrey**	**112**
Nick Stevens	–
**Andrew McIntosh**	**25**
John Reardon	–
**Simon Gillis**	**23**
Sally Brock	–

Semi-finals
Jim Mason	–
**Alexander Allfrey**	**6**
**Andrew McIntosh**	**57**
Simon Gillis	–

Final
**Alexander Allfrey**	**17**
Andrew McIntosh	–

=== Spring Fours ===
14 points were awarded to the champions, 8 to the runners-up, 4 to semi-finalists and 1 to quarter-finalists. The higher ranked seed is listed first in each case; By convention, team names are based on the surname of the captain.

Quarter-finals
De Botton	48
**Mossop**	**56**
**Allfrey**	**72**
Penfold	48
**Vitas**	**94**
Robertson	60

Semi-finals
**Hinden**	**84**
Mossop	78
Allfrey	47
**Vitas**	**55**

Final
**Hinden**	**55**
Vitas	51

=== Premier League (Division 1) ===
16 points were awarded to the champions, 8 to 2nd place, 4 to 3rd place and 2 to 4th place. 8 teams participated. By convention, team names are based on the surname of the captain.

Place	Name	Opponents								Adj	Total
Place	Name	ALL	DHO	FEG	MOS	PEN	CRO	HIN	DUN	Adj	Total
1st place, gold medalist(s)	Allfrey	–	36.90	33.63	44.63	39.89	38.07	53.46	47.21		**293.79**
**2**	Dhondy	23.10	–	29.38	44.38	38.25	34.39	28.66	45.08		**243.24**
**3**	Fegarty	26.37	30.62	–	33.00	20.29	30.83	27.65	34.11		**202.87**
**4**	Mossop	15.37	15.62	27.00	–	34.07	38.60	35.93	33.61		**200.20**
5	Penfold	20.11	21.75	39.71	25.93	–	42.63	23.93	24.73		**198.79**
6	Crouch	21.93	25.61	29.17	21.40	17.37	–	35.95	42.32		**193.75**
7	Hinden	6.54	31.34	32.35	24.07	36.07	24.05	–	32.92		**187.34**
8	Dunn	12.79	14.92	25.89	26.39	35.27	17.68	27.08	–	−1	**159.02**

=== Crockfords Cup (Finals) ===
12 points were awarded to the champions, 6 to 2nd place, 4 to 3rd place, 2 to 4th place and 1 to all other finalists (5th to 8th). By convention, team names are based on the surname of the captain.

Place	Name	Opponents								Adj	Total
Place	Name	SEN	ALL	MOR	PAT	DHO	SMI	DRA	JON	Adj	Total
1st place, gold medalist(s)	Senior	–	7	5	18	14	17	13	20		**94**
**2**	Allfrey	13	–	16	9	12	16	16	5		**87**
**3**	Moran	15	4	–	20	6	3	13	18		**79**
**4**	Patterson	2	11	0	–	14	19	16	12		**74**
**5**	Dhondy	6	8	14	6	–	4	16	16		**70**
**6**	Smith	3	4	17	1	16	–	10	13		**64**
**7**	Draper	7	6	7	4	4	10	–	19		**57**
**8**	Jones	0	15	2	8	4	7	1	–		**37**

=== Four Star Teams (A Final) ===
8 points were awarded to the champions, 4 to 2nd place, 2 to 3rd place and 1 to 4th place. 8 teams participated. By convention, team names are based on the surname of the captain.

Place	Name	Opponents								Adj	Total
Place	Name	HIN	BER	BUT	BLA	ROB	HAC	HAN	RAI	Adj	Total
1st place, gold medalist(s)	Hinden	–	4	17	6	18	20	9	13		**87**
**2**	Berg	16	–	8	7	11	17	12	15		**86**
**3**	Butland	3	12	–	17	14	8	16	10		**80**
**4**	Black	14	13	3	–	13	11	16	9		**79**
5	Robertson	2	9	6	7	–	13	16	10		**63**
6	Hackett	0	3	12	9	7	–	16	11		**58**
7	Hanlon	11	8	4	4	4	4	–	19		**54**
8	Raine	7	5	10	11	10	9	1	–		**53**

=== National Point-a-Board Teams (Final) ===
6 points were awarded to the champions, 3 to 2nd place, 2 to 3rd place and 1 to 4th place. 8 teams participated. By convention, team names are based on the surname of the captain.

Place	Name	Opponents								Adj	Total
Place	Name	KEN	GRE	ALL	BYR	ORA	JON	LIN	STE	Adj	Total
1st place, gold medalist(s)	Kent	–	10	6	7	8	4	7	11		**53**
**2**	Green	2	–	7	8	7	8	8	9		**49**
**3**	Allerton	6	5	–	5	9	7	7	7		**46**
**4**	Byrne	5	4	7	–	6	6	5	10		**43**
**4**	Oram	4	5	3	6	–	9	9	7		**43**
6	Jones	8	4	5	6	3	–	5	8		**39**
7	Lindfors	5	4	5	7	3	7	–	5		**36**
8	Stevenson	1	3	5	2	5	4	7	–		**27**

Due to a tie for 4th place, both teams received 1 point in the championship standings.

=== Summer Meeting Swiss Pairs ===
12 points were awarded to the champions, 6 to 2nd place, 3 to 3rd place, 2 to 4th place and 1 to 5th place. 287 pairs participated of which the top 10 are displayed below.

Place	Names	Session 1	Session 2	Session 3	Session 4	Adj	Total
1st place, gold medalist(s)	Michael Byrne & Kieran Dyke	47	38	47	65		197
**1**	David Arundel & Andrew Bannock	36	56	51	54		197
**3**	Jeremy Dhondy & Andy Hughes	41	55	43	56		195
**4**	Norman Selway & Kay Preddy	52	46	44	52		194
**5**	David Gold & Susanna Gross	51	41	40	56		188
6	Andrew Black & Gunnar Hallberg	43	45	50	46		184
7	Irving Gordon & Yvonne Wiseman	34	47	47	55		183
8	Mike Ash & Christopher Chambers	48	51	53	30		182
9	Brian Senior & Geoffrey Wolfarth	41	42	40	57		180
9	Andrew Robson & Alexander Allfrey	49	59	31	41		180

Michael Byrne and Kieran Dyke won the trophy on a split-tie decision, but championship points were split equally at 9 each.

=== National Pairs (Final) ===
8 points were awarded to the champions, 4 to 2nd place, 2 to 3rd place and 1 to 4th place. 50 pairs participated in the final of which the top 10 are displayed below.

Place	Names	Score
1st place, gold medalist(s)	Phil Godfrey & James Thrower	61.51
**2**	Krzysztof Ginda & Mark Hooper	59.37
**3**	Waseem Naqvi & Tony Waterlow	58.30
**4**	Miles Cowling & David Jones	57.49
5	David Armstrong & Jill Armstrong	54.96
6	Tim Brierley & Mike Elliott	54.83
7	Peter Hawkes & Chris Kinloch	54.33
8	Steve Auchterlonie & Malcolm Lewis	53.98
9	Dick Davey & Ed Scerri	53.81
10	Mark Hodgson & Maggie Jones	53.61

=== Guardian Trophy ===
6 points were awarded to the champions, 3 to 2nd place, 2 to 3rd place and 1 to 4th place. 99 pairs participated of which the top 10 are displayed below.

Place	Names	Score
1st place, gold medalist(s)	Janet de Botton & Artur Malinowski	62.16
**2**	Karl Baumann & Geir Brekka	62.13
**3**	Tom Townsend & Mark Teltscher	62.13
**4**	Dan McIntosh & Robert Myers	58.71
5	Peter Nicholls & Brian Ransley	57.64
6	Anita Sinclair & Zia Mahmood	57.55
7	Mark Westley & Arnie Anidjar-Romain	57.39
8	Heather Bakhshi & Claire Robinson	56.95
9	Celia Oram & Derek Oram	56.66
10	David Gold & Susanna Gross	56.42

=== Two Star Pairs (Final) ===
6 points were awarded to the champions, 3 to 2nd place, 2 to 3rd place and 1 to 4th place. 20 pairs participated in the final of which the top 10 are displayed below.

Place	Names	Score
1st place, gold medalist(s)	Mike Bell & Alex Hydes	58.91
**2**	Jackie Davies & Malcolm Pollack	57.26
**3**	Nick Boss & Richard Johnson	54.89
**4**	Celia Oram & Derek Oram	54.75
5	Taf Anthias & Pat Davies	54.44
6	Sarah Teshome & James Thrower	53.45
7	Peter Hasenson & David Sherman	52.96
8	David Gold & Susanna Gross	52.56
9	Angus Simpson & Claire Robinson	50.95
10	Peter Law & David Kendrick	50.83
