= 2015–16 EBU Player of the Year Championship =

Tournament information
- Sport: Bridge
- Dates: October 2015–September 2016
- Administrator: English Bridge Union

Final positions
- Champions: Alexander Allfrey; Andrew Robson

The 2015–16 EBU Player of the Year Championship was the competition's second season. Points were accumulated over the EBU's ten most prestigious events from 1 October 2015 to 30 September 2016. Alexander Allfrey and Andrew Robson became the first pair to share the title.

== List of competitions ==
Event	Format	Dates	Points							
Event	Format	Dates	1st	2nd	3rd	4th	5th	6th	7th	8th
Gold Cup	Single-Elimination Teams	—	16	8	4		1			
Spring Fours	Double-Elimination Teams	29 April – 3 May 2016	14	8	4		1			–
Premier League (Division 1)	Triple Round-Robin Teams	12 September – 8 November 2015	16	8	4	2	–			
Crockfords Cup	Single-Elimination Teams with Finals	—	12	6	4	2	1	1	1	1
Four Star Teams	Swiss Teams with Finals	26–28 August 2016	8	4	2	1	–			
National Point-a-Board Teams	PaB Teams – Qualifier and Finals	16–17 January 2016	6	3	2	1	–			
Summer Meeting Swiss Pairs	Swiss Pairs	19–21 August 2016	12	6	3	2	1	–		
National Pairs	Regional and National Matchpoint Pairs	13 March & 16 – 17 April 2016	8	4	2	1	–			
Guardian Trophy	Matchpoint Pairs	25 – 26 March 2016	6	3	2	1	–			
Two Star Pairs	Swiss Pairs with Matchpoint Finals	16 – 17 October 2015	6	3	2	1	–			

== Results ==
Place	Name	Event										Total
Place	Name	GC	SF	PL	CC	FST	PaB	SMSP	NP	GT	TSP	Total
1st place, gold medalist(s)	Alexander Allfrey	1	**14**	8	6			**12**				**41**
1st place, gold medalist(s)	Andrew Robson	1	**14**	8	6			**12**				**41**
3	Jason Hackett	1		**16**	**12**			6				**35**
4	David Gold	1	**14**	8	6		1					**30**
4	Justin Hackett	1		**16**	**12**		1					**30**
6	David Bakhshi	1	**14**	8	6							**29**
6	Tony Forrester	1	**14**	8	6							**29**
6	David Mossop	1		**16**	**12**							**29**
6	David Price	1		**16**	**12**							**29**
6	Colin Simpson	1		**16**	**12**							**29**

This list displays the top ten players; 143 players received points. Winners of each event are highlighted in bold.
