= Patrick Jourdain =

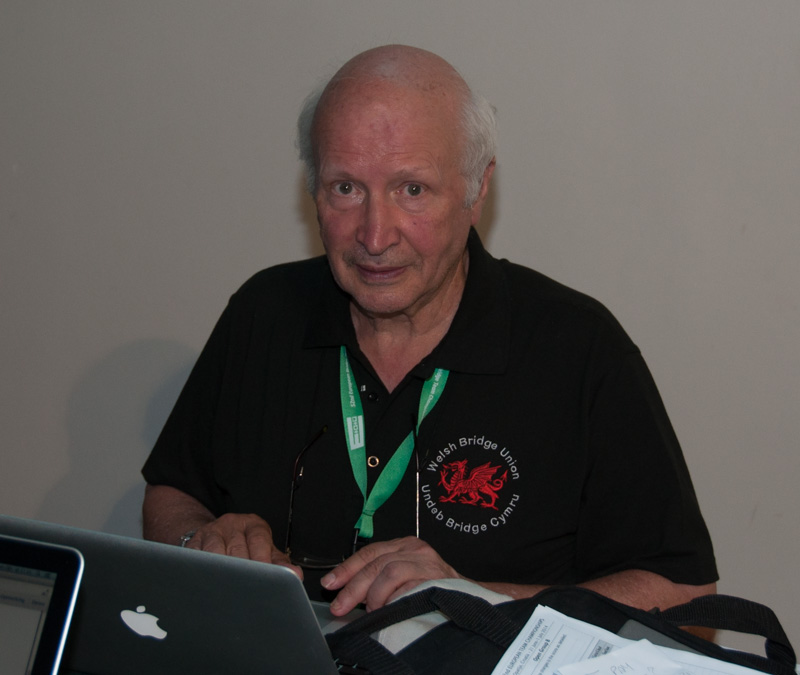
Patrick Jourdain in the Press Room June 2014

Patrick David Jourdain (1 November 1942 – 28 July 2016) was a British bridge player, teacher and journalist. Over six decades he played in more than seventy international matches for Wales, more than any other player. He was bridge correspondent of the Daily Telegraph from 1992 until his death. His World Bridge Federation obituary described him as "the bridge-journalist’s journalist". According to the English Bridge Union's death notice: "Ever the dedicated journalist, he penned his own obituary to ensure that the media would have their copy in timely fashion."

== Life ==
He was born in Woking. He was educated at St Edward's School, Oxford and Peterhouse, Cambridge, where he obtained a degree in Physics and Natural Sciences.

On leaving university he joined GKN in Cardiff as an operational researcher. The company was nationalised as British Steel shortly after he joined it. In 1973 he was promoted to run a team in Glasgow designing computer systems. Four years later he decided it would be viable for him to switch to playing, writing about and teaching bridge full-time. This came as a surprise to British Steel, which had marked him out as a future senior manager.

He was a golfer and tennis player, and a committed Christian. He never married. He died in Cardiff after a short and unexpected illness that proved to be pancreatic cancer.

== Bridge ==
During his time at Peterhouse he became secretary of the Cambridge University Bridge Club, and he played in the 1964 match against Oxford. In 1965, a player in the trials for the Welsh bridge team was taken ill. Jourdain (by now living in Wales owing to his job with GKN) was called in as a substitute, and he and his partner won the trials. The selectors had undertaken that the winners would be given a match in the Camrose Trophy, the competition for the constituent countries of the United Kingdom. He therefore made his international debut in a match against Northern Ireland played in Belfast in early 1966, aged 23 and the youngest ever player for Wales. He subsequently became a regular on the Welsh team over a period of six decades.

In 1976, now based in Glasgow, he won the Gold Cup, the most prestigious British domestic competition. He played two matches for Scotland the following year, helping the side to win the Camrose Trophy. The annual match between Scotland and Wales now has a trophy named after him.

It was at this time that he gave up his career with British Steel, and returned to Cardiff to manage the city's bridge club as well as becoming bridge correspondent of the Western Mail. He also started producing the copy for the TV company Channel 4's teletext bridge section.

In 1982 he was appointed editor of the International Bridge Press Association (IBPA)’s bulletin, a post he held for twenty years. The bulletin was the source of many of the hands featured in the world’s bridge columns, read by millions of players. In the same year he became understudy to G. C. H. Fox, then the Daily Telegraph's bridge correspondent, reporting from each subsequent World and European Championship. He was appointed bridge correspondent ten years later when Fox retired from the role (though Fox continued as bridge columnist).

When in China he played bridge with Deng Xiaoping. He was subsequently commissioned to write the Chairman's obituary for the Telegraph.

Over the years he wrote several stories that made the Telegraph's front page. In 1999 Tony Haworth was found guilty of cheating by the Welsh Bridge Union (WBU) and suspended for ten years. As well as Jourdain's story featuring on the paper's front page it was picked up by the world's media. In addition to writing the story, he was a key figure in Haworth's exposure, having spent months gathering evidence.

His story about a computer coming fifth in a field of top bridge players in solving bridge problems also made the front page. "Today my words have been read by more people than saw Shakespeare when he was alive!" he told a friend. The friend allegedly replied: "Ah, but how many will remember your words two hundred years after you are dead?"

He achieved a world scoop at the 2002 World Championships held in Montreal, when he was told that an unnamed player had refused to take a drugs test, which had been introduced because bridge was hoping to be accepted as a future Olympic sport. At the prize-giving banquet he spotted that a player, Disa Eythorsdottir, was missing when the American women's team went up to receive their medals. Putting two and two together, he found and spoke to the missing player, who told him that she had been stripped of her medal for refusing to take the drugs test, and asked him to make the matter public. Again the story made the Telegraph's front page. The story was widely reported around the world. The following year Eythorsdottir spotted Jourdain at a bridge event and came rushing over. “When I told you to make my treatment public,” she said, “I did not expect the whole world to know!”

At that 2002 event he had the opportunity to play against Bill Gates. Also at the IBPA awards, announced at the Championships, he was named as the Bridge Personality of the Year.

In 2003 he was elected the IBPA's President.

In 2010 he organised the Buffett Cup match between Europe and the USA that took place in Cardiff and preceded the Ryder Cup golf match, featuring "two of the finest bridge teams ever to compete in Britain"; the USA won. In 2014 he was a member of the Welsh team which won the gold medal in the Commonwealth Nations Bridge Championship.

He was a past President and Honorary Life Member of the WBU. He played in the Welsh Open team at the 2016 European Championships only a month before his death. In all he played in seven World Championships and three European Championships. He was President of the British Bridge League in 1995–6 and Chairman of Bridge Great Britain in 2001.

He was principal of the Cardiff School of Bridge, and taught more than a thousand people to play the game.

== Publications ==
- Reese, Terence; Jourdain, Patrick (4 September 1980). Squeeze Play Is Easy. Allen & Unwin. ISBN 978-0047930478.
- Jourdain, Patrick (6 September 1990). Play the Game: Bridge. Weidenfeld & Nicolson. ISBN 978-0706368543.
- Jourdain, Patrick (19 April 2005). The Daily Telegraph Easy Guide to Acol Bridge. Batsford Books. ISBN 978-0713489712.
- Jourdain, Patrick (1 June 2009). Patrick Jourdain's Problem Corner. Master Point Press. ISBN 978-1897106471.
