= 2018–19 EBU Player of the Year Championship =

Tournament information
- Sport: Bridge
- Dates: October 2018–September 2019
- Administrator: English Bridge Union

Final positions
- Champion: Graham Osborne

The 2018–19 EBU Player of the Year Championship was the competition's fifth season. Points were accumulated over the EBU's ten most prestigious events from 1 October 2018 to 30 September 2019. Graham Osborne won his first title, becoming the fifth player to win the championship.

== List of competitions ==
Event	Format	Dates	Points							
Event	Format	Dates	1st	2nd	3rd	4th	5th	6th	7th	8th
Gold Cup	Single-Elimination Teams	—	16	8	4		1			
Spring Fours	Double-Elimination Teams	3 May – 7 May 2019	14	8	4		1			–
Premier League (Division 1)	Triple Round-Robin Teams	15 September – 4 November 2018	16	8	4	2	–			
Crockfords Cup	Single-Elimination Teams with Finals	—	12	6	4	2	1	1	1	1
Four Star Teams	Swiss Teams with Finals	9 August – 11 August 2019	8	4	2	1	–			
National Point-a-Board Teams	PaB Teams – Qualifier and Finals	19 January – 20 January 2019	6	3	2	1	–			
Summer Meeting Swiss Pairs	Swiss Pairs	2 August – 4 August 2019	12	6	3	2	1	–		
National Pairs	Regional and National Matchpoint Pairs	10 March & 6 – 7 April 2019	8	4	2	1	–			
Guardian Trophy	Matchpoint Pairs	19 – 20 April 2019	6	3	2	1	–			
Two Star Pairs	Swiss Pairs with Matchpoint Finals	18 – 19 October 2018	6	3	2	1	–			

== Results ==
Place	Name	Event										Total
Place	Name	GC	SF	PL	CC	FST	PaB	SMSP	NP	GT	TSP	Total
1st place, gold medalist(s)	Graham Osborne			**16**	**12**		2			2		**32**
2	Justin Hackett	1	**14**		6	**8**					2	**31**
3	Jason Hackett	1	**14**		6	**8**						**29**
3	David Mossop	1	**14**		6	**8**						**29**
5	Tony Forrester			**16**	**12**							**28**
6	Ed Jones		**14**		**12**							**26**
6	Glyn Liggins	**16**		8		2						**26**
6	Tom Paske		**14**		**12**							**26**
9	Alex Hydes	1	**14**		6			3				**24**
10	Mike Bell			**16**			**6**	1				**23**
10	David Gold			**16**	4					3		**23**

This list displays the top ten players (including ties); 129 players received points. Winners of each event are highlighted in bold.
