= Little Major =

Bridge bidding system

The Little Major is a bridge bidding system devised primarily by Terence Reese.

== Origins ==
The concept for "the Little Major" was born late in 1962 while Reese was en route to a tournament in the Canary Islands with Boris Schapiro. First with Schapiro and then with Jeremy Flint, Reese created the bidding system over concern about the emergence of artificial bidding systems and as "an Awful Warning of what might happen if every country playing international championships were to arrive with its own wholly artificial system". That objective was soon overtaken by events and the system "was found in itself to be extremely interesting".

Reese promulgated three general principles:

1. Aggressive openings on all hands that are ill-equipped for competition. All such defenceless hands are opened 1♠ or higher.
2. Early definition of range and type. Opening suit bids from 1♠ to 2♠ are precise as to range and pattern.
3. Extension of bidding vocabulary through use of relay bids and two-way bids.

As the system evolved, it was awarded an 'A' licence by the English Bridge Union (EBU) which meant that it could be played in certain restricted events. It was first used in 1963 in international competition by Schapiro and Reese at the 23rd European Team Championships in Baden-Baden, Germany. That created a great deal of interest. Flint and Reese used the Little Major in the 1964/65 world team championship at Buenos Aires.

== Features ==
The meanings of opening bids are as follows:

1♣ = four or more hearts, might include a longer minor. Might be three hearts with a long minor (or both minors with 16+ high card points (HCP). A 1♦ response is a relay.
1♦ = four or more spades, might have a longer minor or a 17-19 notrump hand. Can be three spades with a long minor or both minors with 16+ HCP. A 1♥ response is a relay.
1♥ = NT hand of 20+ points, an Acol two-bid or stronger, or a weakish balanced or semi-balanced hand of approximately 3 to 6 HCP.
1♠ = 12-15 points, 5-4 or better in the minors.
1NT = 14-16 balanced.
2♣, 2♦ = 12-15 with a fair suit, unbalanced one suiter.
2♥, 2♠ = five or more of the suit bid and four or more of a minor. 16 to 20 HCP
2NT = Either a weak minor suit pre-empt or a strong distributional minor two-suiter.
3♣, 3♦ = Strong, mainly minor-suit hand, 15-18, usually 6-4 or 7-3.
3♥ up to 4♠ as in Acol.

Described for 'the first time' in Reese's book Bridge Conventions Finesses and Coups (1965), it was also described in the Bridge Magazine on two occasions, the last in the August 1969 issue. An 11-page summary is presented in the 1968 book by Reese and Albert Dormer Bridge For Tournament Players.

== Abandonment ==
The Little Major was abandoned entirely when its two-year EBU 'A' license was withdrawn "on the grounds that not enough players were playing the system". The entry for the Little Major in the 1971 edition of the Official Encyclopedia of Bridge had already noted that it was "now obsolete".
