= 2020–21 EBU Player of the Year Championship =

Tournament information
- Sport: Bridge
- Dates: October 2020–September 2021
- Administrator: English Bridge Union

Final positions
- Champions: Boye Brogeland; Espen Erichsen

The 2020–21 EBU Player of the Year Championship is the current season of this competition. Points were accumulated over the EBU's nine most prestigious events from 1 October 2020 to 30 September 2021 (the Premier League did not take place due to COVID-19). Boye Brogeland and Espen Erichsen became the second pair to share the title.

== List of competitions ==
Event	Format	Dates	Points							
Event	Format	Dates	1st	2nd	3rd	4th	5th	6th	7th	8th
Gold Cup	Single-Elimination Teams	—N/a	16	8	4		1			
Spring Fours	Double-Elimination Teams	30 April – 4 May 2021	14	8	4		1			–
Premier League (Division 1)	Triple Round-Robin Teams	Cancelled due to COVID-19	16	8	4	2	–			
Crockfords Cup	Single-Elimination Teams with Finals	—N/a	12	6	4	2	1	1	1	1
Four Star Teams	Swiss Teams with Finals	13–15 August 2021	8	4	2	1	–			
National Point-a-Board Teams	Round-Robin PaB Teams	23–24 January 2021	6	3	2	1	–			
Summer Meeting Swiss Pairs	Swiss Pairs	6–8 August 2021	12	6	3	2	1	–		
National Pairs	Regional and National Matchpoint Pairs	21 March – 11 April 2021	8	4	2	1	–			
Guardian Trophy	Matchpoint Pairs	2–3 April 2021	6	3	2	1	–			
Two Star Pairs	Swiss Pairs with Matchpoint Finals	23–24 October 2020	6	3	2	1	–			

== Results ==
Place	Name	Event										Total
Place	Name	GC	SF	PL	CC	FST	PaB	SMSP	NP	GT	TSP	Total
1st place, gold medalist(s)	Boye Brogeland		**14**	NH			**6**					**20**
1st place, gold medalist(s)	Espen Erichsen		**14**	NH			**6**					**20**
3	David Bakhshi	8	4	NH			**6**					**18**
3	Simon Gillis	4	**14**	NH								**18**
5	John Carroll	**16**		NH								**16**
5	Nick Fitzgibbon	**16**		NH								**16**
5	Tommy Garvey	**16**		NH								**16**
5	Adam Mesbur	**16**		NH								**16**
5	Mark Moran	**16**		NH								**16**
5	Fredrik Nystrom	**16**		NH								**16**

This list displays the top ten players; 157 players received points. Winners of each event are highlighted in bold. NH indicates Not Held.
