= English Bridge Union =

Player-funded organisation

Logo of EBU

The English Bridge Union or EBU is a player-funded organisation that promotes and organises the card game of duplicate bridge in England. It is based at offices in Aylesbury. The EBU is a member of the European Bridge League and thus affiliated with the World Bridge Federation, which promulgates the laws of the game.

The EBU is owned by 39 county associations whose shareholdings are determined by the numbers of EBU member residents. The county associations elect annually a board of eight directors, including a chair and vice-chair, and meet with the board once a year to assist in determining policy. The shareholders also elect an honorary treasurer and two standing committees which are accountable to the EBU board; each committee has seven elected members. The current (October 2023) chair is Adrian Darnell.

The EBU works alongside the charity English Bridge Education and Development (EBED), particularly on issues to relating to teaching bridge, and events for junior players.

== History ==
The British Bridge League (BBL) was formed in 1931, and many local associations and clubs affiliated with it. In Yorkshire, for example, Halifax, Hull, Leeds, Sheffield and East Yorkshire all affiliated with the BBL.

At national level the Scottish Bridge Union was formed in 1933 and the Welsh Contract Bridge Association the following year. There was still no English equivalent, but area associations were being set up: Yorkshire and the North East were formed in 1935 and the North West soon afterward. In 1936 those three bodies proposed merging to create a single Northern Association under the BBL.

Scottish and Irish representatives were willing to meet on equal terms only with those from an English national organisation, so it was decided to set up an English Bridge Union, to be composed of the three northern associations, a proposed London association and as many county associations as could be created.

The EBU was formed on 23 May 1936. At its second council meeting on 12 June it was decided that there should be eight constituent area associations: North Eastern, North Western, Yorkshire, West Midlands, North Midlands, Eastern Counties, London & Home Counties and South Western. However the BBL and another organisation, the British Bridge Association, continued to operate in England, which restricted the development of the EBU during the next few years. The EBU was reorganised during the 1939/40 season to involve the counties directly, similar to the current structure.

A council meeting was held in July 1939 which led to the new EBU organisation replacing the old, with the first meeting of the "new" EBU council being held on 15 March 1940. For the first time, those attending were representatives of individual counties rather than regional associations. According to the minutes, the 23 counties that were represented or sent their apologies were Bedfordshire, Buckinghamshire, Derbyshire, Devonshire, Essex, Gloucestershire, Hampshire, Hertfordshire, Kent, Leicestershire, Lincolnshire, London, Middlesex, North East, North West, Nottinghamshire, Oxfordshire, Salop, Somerset, Surrey, Sussex, Warwickshire and Yorkshire.

During World War Two organised bridge was in abeyance, but by 1945 seven counties had been reformed: Gloucestershire, the North East, the North West, Nottinghamshire, Oxfordshire, Warwickshire and Yorkshire; next year there were 19 newly formed or reformed county associations. The EBU had not yet resumed operations, however, and so a new organisation called the Tournament Bridge Association was set up to organise events and congresses, including the Crockfords Cup and the Lederer Memorial Cup. The EBU and the TBA soon realised that a single body for duplicate bridge was needed, and all the TBA members eventually joined the EBU. As a result, the number of county associations affiliated with the EBU doubled to 38.

English players took part in European and World competitions as part of Great Britain teams until 2000, when the European Bridge League accepted the EBU as a national bridge organisation (along with the Scottish and Welsh unions). Since the selection and organisation of Great Britain teams had become the BBL's main reason for existence, it was dissolved and its remaining functions were taken over by a new body, Bridge Great Britain.

The first EBU sub-committee was the Selection Committee, established 28 March 1937. The Tournament Committee was set up on 8 June 1945 and the Laws and Ethics Committee, originally called the Rules and Ethics Committee, on 1 April 1947.

On 1 April 2010, the EBU ushered in the biggest ever shake-up in its structure by introducing Universal Membership.

On 23 May 2011 the EBU celebrated its 75th anniversary.

The EBU has about 47,000 members and 558 affiliated clubs as at 2024. The organisation has 16 staff (of whom some are part-time) based in Aylesbury, Buckinghamshire. It also relies on a huge team of volunteers and a board of eight elected volunteer directors.

== Committees ==
=== Laws and Ethics Committee ===
The Laws and Ethics committee is the Regulating Authority for the game of duplicate contract bridge in England, when played under the auspices of the EBU. It has three principal functions: it is the final EBU appeal body for appeals arising under the laws of the game; it is the principal disciplinary body of the EBU, hearing complaints against members; and it organises publication of the Blue Book, which contains regulations for the conventions and agreements permitted in different classes of competition, and other directives which supplement the laws of the game, and the White Book which handles technical matters of the game.

=== Selection Committee ===
The EBU selection committee is responsible for all aspects of England's international representation. It determines the format of trial matches to assist in choosing teams for major international championships such as the European Championship competed for bi-annually and for the annual home international series involving England, Wales, Scotland, Northern Ireland and Éire. The home internationals are known as the Camrose Trophy (Open), the Lady Milne (Women), and Teltscher (Seniors). England currently selects for the Camrose Trophy using its flagship event the "Premier League" which has three divisions of eight teams playing long matches against all other teams. The winners of Division 1 are guaranteed Camrose Selection.

== Education ==
English Bridge Teachers Association, known as EBTA (formerly The EBU Teachers' Association/EBUTA) was established by the EBU and is now run by the charity English Bridge Education and Development. EBTA exists to promote and support effective bridge teaching. Its aims are to attain the highest standard of bridge teaching across England, professionalise the teaching of bridge; in order to maximise the number of bridge players. These aims are achieved through EBTA membership and the provision, to its members, of information, advice and training related to all aspects of bridge teaching.

MiniBridge is used to help introduce players into the game. It is also being introduced to Primary Schools across England to help promote skills in Maths and English.

The EBU also works with English Bridge Education and Development to co-ordinate a project in producing teachers from their affiliated clubs.

English Bridge Education and Development launched a Junior Award Scheme in 2015. It is an award scheme that offers graded attainment levels dependent upon teacher assessed ability demonstrated at the table. The scheme breaks down the skills required to develop from raw rookie to serious contender into a set of steps and milestones which can be easily understood and evaluated in the classroom. These skills (covering bidding, play and defence) are grouped into six progressive levels of attainment: MiniBridge, Bronze, Silver, Gold, Platinum and Diamond. Each level requires the satisfactory ‘demonstration’ of about twenty increasingly difficult elements of technique. It can be used as part of the 'skill section' of The Duke of Edinburgh's Award.

== Juniors ==
The English Bridge Union believes in supporting and encouraging young bridge players. Junior international teams have squad managers.

England are represented at under-16, under-21 and under-26 age groups, and in some competitions by a 'Girls' team (for women under 26 years old). International events include the European and World Championships, the Channel Trophy (against France, Belgium and the Netherlands) and the Junior Camrose Trophy (Under 26) and Peggy Bayer Trophy (Under 21) against the other Home Unions.

The age groups were previously referred to by some countries, including England, as under-15, under-20 and under-25. The nomenclature was changed in 2015 as a standardised naming system was sought, but the age requirements were not adjusted.

The EBU Selection Committee selects the junior international teams.

== Master Points and National Grading Scheme ==
=== Master Points ===
The EBU Master Point scheme is a means of recognising individual lifetime achievement in EBU organised competitions at club, county and national level. It began in September 1956. Points are awarded to the top one third of competitors and the higher the level of competition the greater the number of points awarded. Since 1 January 2013 there have been three main types of Master Point. Green points are won in events of national standing and are necessary for the acquisition of certain senior ranks. The value of a Green Point is 100 Master Points. Blue points are awarded in the next level of competition. The value of a Blue Point is 100 Master Points and all Master Points ranks will allow up to 50 Green points to be replaced by Blue Points in the ratio of 3 Blues = 1 Green. Local Points are won in any event where Green and/or Blue Points are not awarded, and sometimes in addition to Green and/or Blue Points.

The Master Point scheme is believed by some to be imperfect as it rewards the persistent player ("the more you play the more points you earn"). The rankings, however, require Green Points to be won before a player can achieve some of the higher rankings, so such ranked players must have achieved success in national tournaments. A Gold Point scheme is also in place, rewarding those who finished highly in the National Tournaments. This recognises the more elite players, and as these points decay at a rate of 20% per annum they are an indicator of recent success, rather than lifetime achievement.

The highest rank which can be achieved in the EBU Master Point scheme is Premier Grand Master.

=== National Grading Scheme ===
The National Grading Scheme (NGS) was introduced in April 2010 and aims to provides a fair and trustworthy measure of an individual players current performance when playing duplicate bridge. The NGS indicates an individual’s current playing ability based on the last 80 or so playing sessions at whatever level they play. The NGS calculates a current grade and a grade band for each EBU member, which is updated whenever new results for that player are received. The value of the grade is the scheme’s estimate of the percentage score that a player would have achieved on average if partnering another player with the same current grade at Match Pointed Pairs in a field of nationally average strength. EBU grades have been divided into 13 playing card bands, ranging from ‘Ace’ at the top to ‘Two’ at the beginners’ end. Each band covers a 2% range of grade values, with ‘Eight’ having a range of 49‐51%. The scheme is complementary to the Master Point Scheme, and the two schemes are independent.

== Player of the Year Championship ==
The most prestigious events in the EBU calendar, including the Gold Cup, contribute to the Player of the Year Championship. Points are accumulated from 1 October until 30 September.

Since its introduction in 2014/15, the winners are:

| Year | Winner(s) |
|---|---|
| 2014/15 | David Gold |
| 2015/16 | Alexander Allfrey and Andrew Robson |
| 2016/17 | Alexander Allfrey and Andrew Robson |
| 2017/18 | Mike Bell |
| 2018/19 | Graham Osborne |
| 2019/20 | Abandoned due to COVID-19 |
| 2020/21 | Boye Brogeland and Espen Lindqvist |
| 2021/22 | Peter Crouch |
| 2022/23 | Espen Erichson |

== Universal Membership ==
The EBU launched its "Pay to Play" scheme on 1 April 2010 to create Universal Membership, replacing its previous method of financing. A small payment (44 pence from April 2023 to March 2024) is charged each time a player plays at an EBU affiliated club. Payment of this Universal Membership fee means that all members of clubs which are affiliated to the EBU become player members of the EBU. Direct membership of the EBU – for those who play at unaffiliated clubs, or live outside England – is also available.

== Magazines ==
The Contract Bridge Journal was the "official organ of the English Bridge Union" after World War II, being inaugurated in 1946 under editor Maurice Harrison-Gray. It announced its last edition in the December 1955 edition stating that "the firm of Thomas De La Rue & Co. Ltd. has acquired the goodwill of the C.B.J. and will sponsor the publication from next month of a new magazine: The British Bridge World edited by Terence Reese" The new magazine characterized itself on its covers as the "Medium of English Bridge Union News" and the "Successor to the Contract Bridge Journal." It ceased publication in December 1964.

No major magazines were published under or for the English Bridge Union banner in 1965.

The English Bridge Union Quarterly was inaugurated in April 1966 and, in contrast to its predecessors, was the first EBU 'in-house' magazine.

In turn, the English Bridge Union Quarterly was replaced by English Bridge in August 1984 which is still produced four times a year and distributed free of charge to eligible EBU members; electronic copies are available at the EBU website. It is currently edited by Lou Hobhouse.

== English Bridge Education and Development ==
English Bridge Education and Development (EBED) is a charitable incorporated organisation established under the Charities Act 2011, Registered Charity No. 1153543, and is the national charity for the promotion and development of bridge.

It is independent from the English Bridge Union, though does work with the EBU on some projects and receives funding from the EBU for some of its activities.

It has two stated objectives in its constitution: the advancement of amateur sport by promoting the game of duplicate bridge for the public benefit; the advancement of the education of young persons in full-time education in the playing of duplicate bridge.

== See also ==
- Contract bridge
- Duplicate bridge
- List of bridge competitions and awards
- List of bridge governing bodies
