= Swimer =

Swimer is a surname. Notable people with the surname include:

- Dan Swimer (born 1972), British television writer
- Ralph Swimer (1914–1998), British bridge player
