= Fit showing jump bid =

Contract bridge convention

Fit showing jump bid is a contract bridge convention usually played only in competitive bidding situations (i.e. where both sides are bidding).

After a player has opened in a suit (or overcalled) and the opponents are also bidding, his partner's jump in a new suit shows length in the suit bid and support for the opening (or overcalled) suit, normally 5-4 or 4-5 or better in the two suits. The bid is both pre-emptive and competitive in nature and shows a playing-strength for which one would otherwise have jumped to the next higher level in partner's suit. The dual purpose of the convention is to describe one's hand in more detail in order to enable partner to judge better how high to compete in the bidding while at the same time making it more difficult for the opponents to continue to bid.

Fit-jump bids were widely popularized by Andrew Robson and Oliver Segal in the book Partnership Bidding in Bridge.

== Examples ==
North	East	South	West
1♥	1♠	3♣	

The 3♣ bid shows possession of a club suit and support for partner's heart suit with playing strength comparable to a 3♥ pre-emptive bid. If, for example, West then bids 3♠, it is easier for North to judge whether to compete with 4♥ or not.

North	East	South	West
1♠	Double	4♦	

The 4♦ shows possession of a diamond suit and support for partner's spade suit with playing strength comparable to a 4♠ pre-emptive bid.

North	East	South	West
1♥	1♠	2♥ or Double or Pass	4♣

4♣ shows possession of a club suit and support for partner's spade suit with playing strength comparable to a 4♠ preemptive bid.

== Variations ==
The situations where this convention applies vary according to partnership agreement. One variation is to agree that it only applies to non-game jump bids; so, for example, in the auction, 1♠ - (2♣) - 4♥, the 4♥ bid is natural showing a heart suit and is not fit-seeking and does not show support for partner's spade suit.
