= Jonathan Cansino =

Jonathan Cansino (23 October 1939 – 10 October 2006) was an English international bridge player. In the late 1960s to early 70s he had a significant partnership with Jeremy Flint. In his early career he had partnered with John Collins, also a top-class English international player.

Cansino's career was cut short by an operation on a brain tumour when he was 34. The operation left him with an erratic and somewhat impaired mental ability. This put an end to his professional career in the England team, though he was able to play low-stake rubber bridge in a West Hampstead club for some years.

Cansino was the co-inventor of the bidding idea known as the multi 2 diamonds convention.
