= Jeremy Flint =

Jeremy M. Flint (30 August 1928 – 15 November 1989) was an English contract bridge writer and one of the world's leading professional players. He was also a horse racing enthusiast. Flint was born in Leeds but lived in London.

== Life and bridge career ==
Flint was the son of a Leeds surgeon, and was educated at Radley College. He studied to be a lawyer, but soon gave up his legal career. Flint represented Britain in seven European championships, five World team championships and two World pairs. As a member of those British teams he won the European Bridge League championship in 1963, and came second in the world championships of 1960 (World Team Olympiad) and 1987 (Bermuda Bowl). He played rubber bridge and backgammon on a regular basis; this and his work as a bridge correspondent were his main sources of income.

In an extended visit to the US in 1966, partnering Peter Pender, he became a Life Master in ten weeks: this was the record until it was broken by Sabine Zenkel (now Auken) in 1989 at eight weeks. They devised the Flint–Pender bidding system. He was also a collaborator of Terence Reese on the Little Major bidding system, and the author of several popular bidding conventions. Later in the 1960s to early 70s he partnered Jonathan Cansino in the latter's short international career.

Flint was bridge editor of The Times, author of some significant books, and participant in successful television programs about bridge. His first marriage, to Susanna, produced two sons: Dominic and Noel. His second wife, Honor, was also an international bridge player. His early death was caused by cancer.

=== Boris Schapiro's opinion ===
In 1962, Boris Schapiro gave this view of Flint:

"Jeremy Flint is very talented, and a beautiful dummy player and defender. If I had to find a fault in his game it would be slowness and the fact that he is easy to play against. Otherwise he approaches world class."

=== Buenos Aires affair ===
Flint was a member of the British team at the Bermuda Bowl in Buenos Aires, early 1965. Later he gave an account of the accusation of cheating made against Reese and Schapiro. The results of the BBL trials was: 1 Reese—Flint; 2 Konstam—Schapiro; 3 Albert Rose—Ralph Swimer. The BBL then announced the team, omitting Swimer and substituting Maurice Harrison-Gray. Controversy ensued, and eventually Swimer had to be content with being non-playing captain. Reese and Schapiro were hardly on speaking terms at the time; Reese played mainly with Flint, the pair using the Little Major bidding system.

Flint made two main points, over and above those made by Reese in his book: 1. The bitter quarrel between Reese and Schapiro "was surely not the perfect background for alleged dishonest complicity". 2. When Flint was playing with Reese in the closed room, Geoffrey Butler (BBL official) and Waldemar von Zedwitz (senior American master) came to watch. After the session Flint said to Reese:

"Terence, you realise we were being watched."
"Good gracious", he replied "Do you think so?"
"I suppose they must be considering banning the Little Major", I ventured.

"Reese is considered a fool by no-one [but] according to his accusers he continued to exchange signals for the next seven days".

== Publications ==
- Flint, Jeremy, and Freddie North. 1970. Tiger Bridge: the game at the top. Hale, London.
- Flint, Jeremy, and Freddie North. 1971. Bridge in the Looking Glass. Cassell, London.
- Reese, Terence, and Jeremy Flint. 1979. Trick 13. Bibliagora. – a novel
- Flint, Jeremy, and Freddie North. 1980. How to Win More at Racing. Sphere, London.
- Flint, Jeremy, and Richard Sharp. 1980. Competitive Bidding. Cassell, London.
- Flint, Jeremy, and David Greenwood. 1980. Instructions for the Defence. The Bodley Head, London.
- Flint, Jeremy. 1983. Bridge with The Times. Country Life, London.
- Flint, Jeremy. 1983. Grand Slam. Country Life & Newnes, London.
- Flint, Jeremy. 1986. The Winning Edge. Faber & Faber, London.
- Flint, Jeremy and Terence Reese. 1991. Bridge with the Professional Touch. Gollancz, London. – 50 deals from Flint's column in The Times, selected and edited by Reese.
