= Tom Townsend =

English bridge player & writer (born 1971)

- Born: Thomas George Townsend; 19 February 1971 (age 55)
- Occupations: Bridge player and writer
- Writing career
- Period: 1994–present
- Subject: Contract bridge

Thomas George Townsend (born 19 February 1971) is an English bridge player and writer.

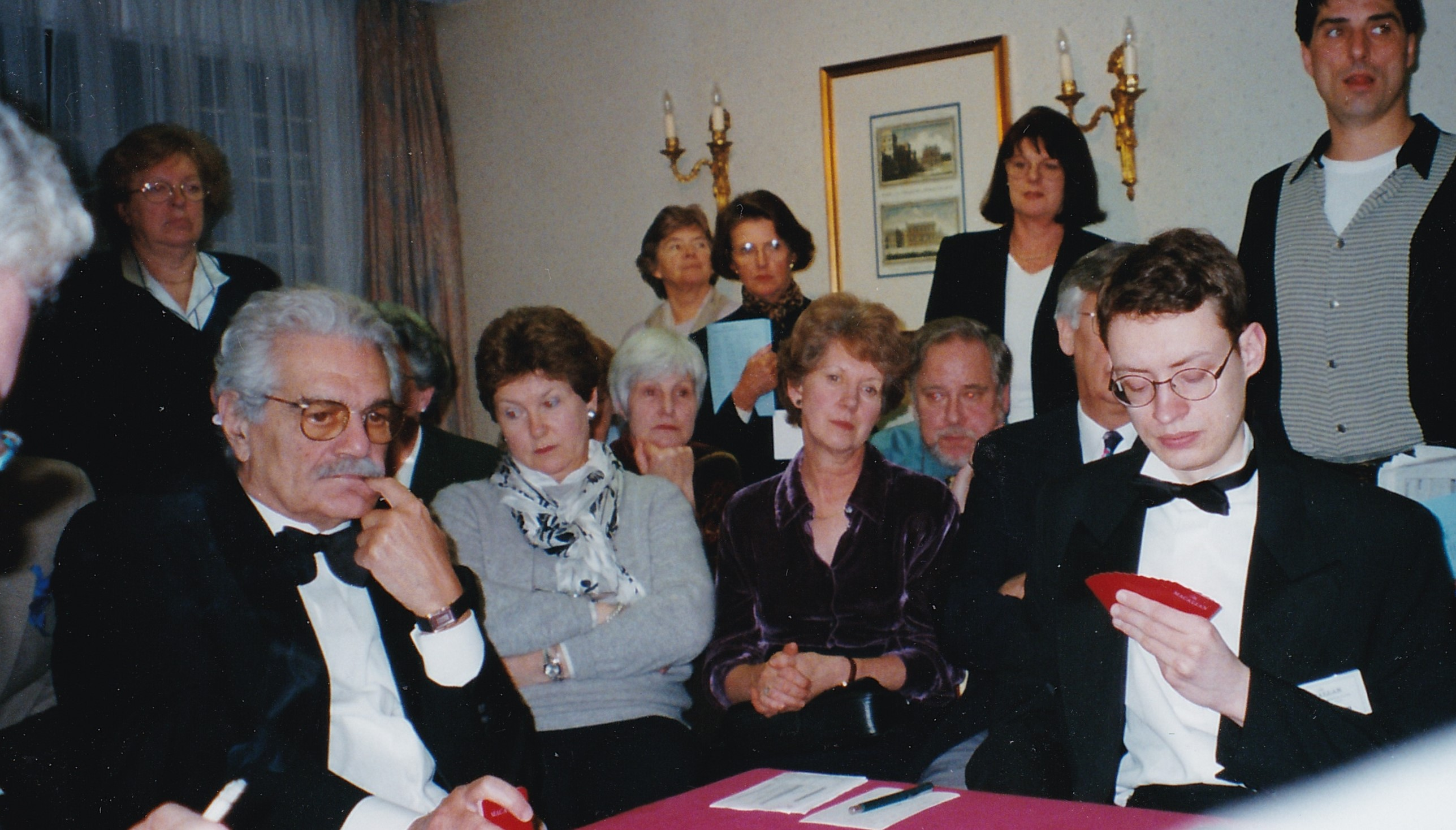
Omar Sharif (Egypt), Tom Townsend (England). The 1997 Macallan International Bridge Pairs Championship

== Personal life ==
Townsend was educated at Wellington College and Cambridge University. He lives in Shepherd's Bush, London, with Polish (in 2022 also English) women's international Ewa Kater and their son Max.

== Bridge career ==
Townsend has been a regular British and England international for over two decades. He is a World Bridge Federation World International Master. Townsend, since 30 September 2013, has been the Monday-Friday bridge columnist for The Daily Telegraph. In July 2019 he also became Sunday Telegraph bridge columnist.

== International honours ==
In partnership with Jeffrey Allerton, Townsend was on the British team that won the European and World Junior Championships in 1994 and 1995 respectively. He was a member of the England open team that were runners-up to Italy at the 2008 Bridge Olympiad in Beijing. With David Gold, his partner in Beijing, Townsend was third in the 2005 European Pairs in Tenerife, and played for England in the 2005 Bermuda Bowl in Estoril. Partnering David Bakhshi, he played on the England team finishing 4th in the 2012 European Championships in Dublin and reaching the quarter-finals of the 2013 Bermuda Bowl in Bali. In 2022 they reached the same stage of the Bermuda Bowl in Salsomaggiore. Partnering Ben Handley-Pritchard on the Knottenbelt team, Townsend came 3rd in the 2023 World Transnational Open Teams in Marrakech. The pair were runners-up in the 2023 ACBL Blue Ribbon Pairs in Atlanta, and reached the quarter-finals of the 2025 Bermuda Bowl in Herning.

== Domestic honours ==
David Gold was his partner in the winning team at the 2000 Brighton Four Stars Teams, in the 2004 and 2006 English International Trials and the 2008 English Premier League. With David Price he was part of the winning Crockfords team on two occasions and also won the 1999 Camrose trials. Partnering David Mossop, Townsend won the British Premier League twice, and also the Spring Foursomes. Townsend won the 2013 Lederer Memorial Trophy in partnership with Stelio di Bello, and the EBU Premier League again that year (and later again in 2019 and 2022) partnering David Bakhshi. Partnering Bakhshi, Dror Padon and Thor Erik Hoftaniska, Townsend won the 2021 BGB Gold Cup (played online because of Covid). He won the Gold Cup again in 2023 and 2025 (played in traditional across-the-table fashion).
