= Minibridge =

Simplified form of the card game Contract Bridge

Minibridge, also spelt MiniBridge, is a simplified form of Contract Bridge designed to expose newcomers to declarer and defensive playing techniques without the burden of having to learning a bridge bidding system. The game was first introduced in France and the Netherlands in the 1990s. The variant described in this article is the one advertised by the English Bridge Union for use in primary schools as a way to improve pupils' performance in mathematics.

Like other forms of bridge, Minibridge is played by four players in fixed partnerships, sitting crosswise. A full deck of 52 cards is dealt to the players, each receiving 13 cards. As in contract bridge, it is then decided which player becomes declarer, but a key innovation of Minibridge is that this decision is taken out of the players' hands. Declarer's partner then lays open their hand, and declarer announces a contract. This is a trump suit or no trumps, together with an undertaking to win more than half the tricks (partscore) or even to win 100 trick points or more (game). The remainder of the game is very similar to contract bridge. In particular, declarer's partner becomes dummy and declarer plays both hands.

== Bidding ==
High-card points
Rank	A	K	Q	J	10–2
Points	4	3	2	1	0

Each player adds all high-card points in their hand and announces the result. The partnership with more combined high-card points then plays the hand. If both partnerships have the same number of high-card points (i.e., 20 each), the hand is redealt. Of this partnership, the partner with more high-card points becomes the declarer.

The partner with fewer high-card points becomes the dummy: this player's hand is put face up on the table, and is played by declarer in addition to declarer's own hand. If both partners have the same number of high-card points, the one who states his high-card point count first is the declarer.

Tricks needed for winning
Denomination	Partscore	Game
No trumps	7	9
Major suit (♥ or ♠)	7	10
Minor suit (♣ or ♦)	7	11

Having consulted dummy's hand, declarer decides the denomination (i.e., the trump suit, if any), and whether to be in game or a partscore or a slam. For partscore, declarer needs to win 7 tricks in order to score. For game, 9–11 tricks are necessary, depending on the denomination. For slam, 12 or 13 tricks are necessary.

One variation gaining popularity is for dummy to announce only their shape (how many cards in each suit) before declarer chooses the contract, and the dummy cards are exposed only after the opening lead is made.

Declarer's decision is often based on a few simple guidelines:

1. Two balanced hands usually require about 25 high-card points to score a game bonus.
2. With eight cards (or more) in either Major suit (a "Golden Fit"), that suit should usually be the trump suit.
3. Without a "Golden Fit" in a Major suit, play notrump.

== Card Play ==
Card play is as in any other form of Bridge (and as in any other variant of Whist, except that declarer plays two hands). The player to the left of declarer leads to the first trick. Players must follow suit whenever possible. The winner of a trick leads to the next trick.

== Scoring ==
The declarer must always win at least 7 of the 13 tricks played. Each trick beyond 6 scores 30 trick points, or 20 trick points in case of a minor suit contract (clubs or diamonds). For a notrumps contract, 10 trick points are added to the trick points total.

Tricks	0	1	2	3	4	5	6	7	8	9	10	11	12	13
Denomination	Trick points													
Notrump	–							40	70	100	130	160	190	220
♥ or ♠	–							30	60	90	120	150	180	210
♣ or ♦	–							20	40	60	80	100	120	140
Denomination	Total score: partscore													
Notrump	–350	–300	–250	–200	–150	–100	–50	90	120	150	180	210	240	270
♥ or ♠	–350	–300	–250	–200	–150	–100	–50	80	110	140	170	200	230	260
♣ or ♦	–350	–300	–250	–200	–150	–100	–50	70	90	110	130	150	170	190
Denomination	Total score: game													
Notrump	–450	–400	–350	–300	–250	–200	–150	–100	–50	400	430	460	490	520
♥ or ♠	–500	–450	–400	–350	–300	–250	–200	–150	–100	–50	420	450	480	510
♣ or ♦	–550	–500	–450	–400	–350	–300	–250	–200	–150	–100	–50	400	420	440

When a partscore contract is won, declarer's partnership scores their trick points plus 50 bonus points. When a game contract is won, declarer scores the trick points (which must amount to at least 100) plus a bonus of 300 points. When a small slam (12 trick) contract is won there is an extra bonus of 500 points, and for a grand slam (13 trick) contract the bonus is 1000 points. If declarer does not win the necessary number of tricks, then declarer's partnership scores 0 points and the opposing party scores 50 points for every missing trick. In the table this is written as negative scores (which do not exist).

== Bibliography ==
- Wilson, Gavin (2019). Minibridge — A Beginner's Guide. Claygate, Surrey, UK: Org2B Press. ASIN B082XH8TWH.
