= Sarah Bell (bridge) =

English bridge player

Sarah Bell (née O'Connor) is an English silver-medallist World Champion bridge player. She came second in the Women's Pair event in Wrocław in 2022.

Sarah is a natural sciences graduate of Cambridge University. She teaches Chemistry at a school in London.

== Bridge accomplishments ==
=== Wins ===
- North American Bridge Championships (1)
  - Chicago Mixed Board-a-Match (1) 2017

== Runners-up ==
- World Bridge Series Women Pairs (1) 2022

== Personal life ==
Sarah is married to Mike Bell, a professional Bridge player.
