= British Bridge League =

Former governing body of bridge in the United Kingdom

The British Bridge League (BBL) was founded in 1931 by A. E. Manning Foster. It formerly selected bridge teams to represent Great Britain in European and World competitions and organised the Camrose Trophy, the Gold Cup, the Portland Cup and the Lady Milne Trophy.

In June 1999, the European Bridge League agreed that England, Scotland and Wales could compete as individual nations from 1 January 2000, rather than (as formerly) under the banner of Great Britain. (Other than in the Camrose Trophy, Northern Ireland and the Republic of Ireland compete as one nation, Ireland, under the auspices of the Irish Bridge Union.)

With its responsibility for selecting a national team obsolete, the BBL was dissolved at the end of 1999 and was superseded in its organisational functions by Bridge Great Britain.

== See also ==
- English Bridge Union
