= Gunnar Hallberg =

English bridge player

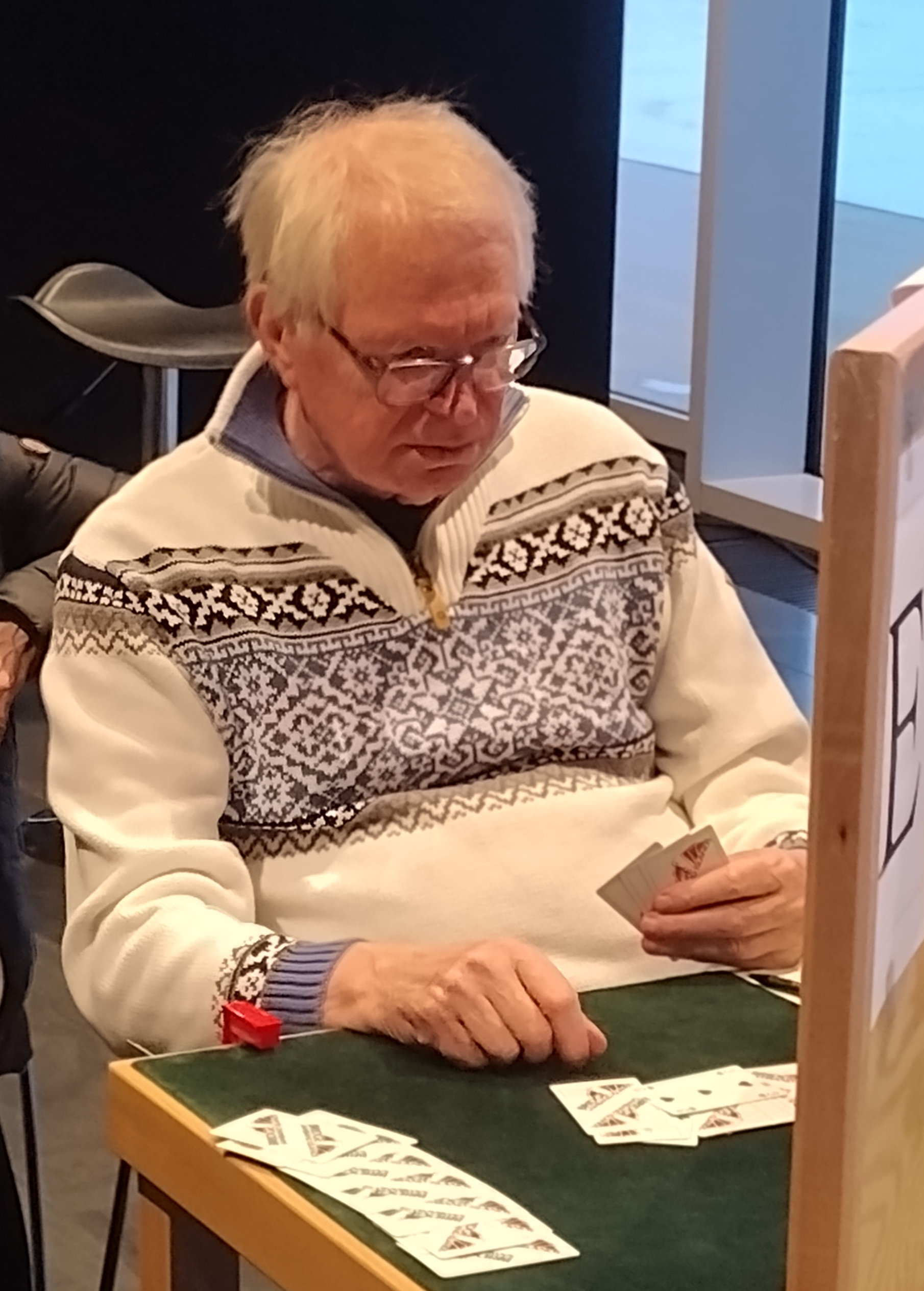
- Gunnar Hallberg at the Iceland Bridge Federation tournament, January 2024
- Born: Gunnar Hallberg; Sweden

Gunnar Hallberg is a World Champion English bridge player.

== Bridge accomplishments ==
=== Wins ===
- World Bridge Championships (1)
  - D'Orsi Bowl (1) 2019
- European Bridge Championships (1)
  - Senior European Championships (1) 2014
- Gold Cup (6) 2002, 2003, 2005, 2010, 2017, 2022
- Premier League Winner (8) 2008, 2011, 2013, 2014, 2016, 2017, 2018, 2021
- Spring Fours Winner (3) 2000, 2004, 2007
- Tollemache Cup (1) 2006

=== North American Bridge Championships ===
- Winner of 2006 Vanderbilt

== Notes ==
"International record for Gunnar Hallberg". World Bridge Federation.
