= Ralph Swimer =

British bridge player

- Born: 14 October 1914; Poland
- Died: 28 February 1998 (aged 83); London, United Kingdom
- Occupation: Contract bridge player
- Known for: nonplaying captain, 1965 Great Britain team

Ralph Swimer (14 October 1914 – 28 February 1998) was a British bridge player. He is best known as nonplaying captain, or npc, of the 1965 Great Britain Bermuda Bowl team. During that World Bridge Federation championship tournament in Buenos Aires, the British pair Terence Reese and Boris Schapiro were accused of cheating. (Note: Fifty years later, Deborah Davis dramatised the episode in a radio play, "The Great British Bridge Scandal", which BBC Radio 4 produced and broadcast 2 April 2014 as Afternoon Drama, repeated on 29 April 2016.)

Alan Truscott—bridge editor for The New York Times from 1 January 1964 until his death in 2005—covered the January 1965 tournament, where he helped develop the allegations, convince Captain Swimer, and testify for the WBF hearing. Decades later, his NYT bridge column in obituary of Swimer featured the affair. "In England", Truscott summarised, "Swimer was hailed as a hero by some but targeted as a villain by others."

Swimer was a member of the 1960 Great Britain open team in Turin, which finished second to France in the first quadrennial World Team Olympiad. (Note: The Bermuda Bowl, inaugurated 1950, was contested annually from 1953 to 1959. For many years thereafter, it was contested three years out of four, with the World Team Olympiad tournaments (open and women) held in the first year of each Olympiad.) His partner there was Jeremy Flint, who also played on the 1965 Bermuda Bowl team that Swimer led as npc.

Swimer was born in Poland and came to Britain in the early 1920s. He died in London, England, after a short illness.
