= Terence Reese =

Bridge player and writer

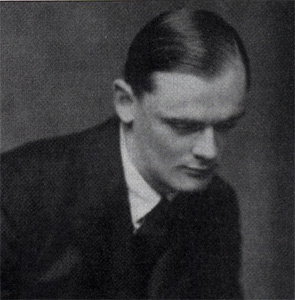
Terence Reese as a young man

John Terence Reese (28 August 1913 – 29 January 1996) was a British bridge player and writer, regarded as one of the finest of all time in both fields. He was born in Epsom, Surrey, England to middle-class parents, and was educated at Bradfield College and New College, Oxford, where he studied classics and attained a double first, graduating in 1935.

== Life ==
Reese's father, the son of a Welsh clergyman, worked in a bank until he transferred to his wife's family catering business. Reese said "I played card games before I could read". As a small boy, when his mother "issued the standard warning about not talking to strange men, my father remarked that it was the strange men who should be warned against trying to talk to me".

Reese's mother Anne ran a hotel near Guildford, and with it a bridge club, so Reese played in the earliest duplicate matches, circa 1930. Whilst at Oxford he met some serious bridge players, amongst whom were Lt.-Col. Walter Buller, Iain Macleod and Maurice Harrison-Gray, the strongest player in the country at that time. Within a year of graduating and after a brief stint at Harrod's, Reese started working for Hubert Phillips's magazine and co-wrote his first book with him in 1937. Phillips acknowledges that although the book is published jointly under their names, "Terence is the real author of the book", receiving only assistance in planning contents and editing from Phillips. From that point on, Reese's profession was that of a champion contract bridge player and prolific writer on the game.

Reese joined the ARP a few months before the war, and was never inducted into the armed forces. He ended up working in the factory of Pedro Juan (a fellow bridge player), which manufactured black-out curtains. When a Ministry of Labour inspector turned up to check on him, a hasty phone-call was needed to get Terence into an office surrounded by ledgers.

Reese had some hobbies; even those he pursued with typical commitment. He was always a cricket and chess enthusiast. After World War II, he made a book on greyhound racing; later he became an avid football fan, reputedly supporting Queen's Park Rangers, whose ground was next door to the White City Stadium, a home of greyhound racing. He played various other games for money, especially canasta, poker and backgammon, and wrote books on them.

From the late 1930s to the mid-1950s, Reese presented a number of BBC radio and television programmes about bridge. He edited the British Bridge World from 1956 to 1962.

He married Alwyn Sherrington in 1970. They resided in London and later in Hove, Sussex, where he died of aspirin poisoning at home on 29 January 1996 at the age of 82. An inquest ruled his death accidental.

== Career as a player ==
As a bridge player, Reese won every honour in the game, including the European Championship four times (1948, 1949, 1954, 1963) and the Bermuda Bowl (effectively, the World Team Championship) in 1955—all as a member of the Great Britain open team. He was World Par champion in 1961 and placed second in both the inaugural World Team Olympiad, 1960, and the inaugural World Open Pairs, 1962. He also represented Britain in the 1965 Bermuda Bowl and in five other European Championships. He won the Gold Cup, the premier British domestic competition, on eight occasions.

Reese last participated in international bridge at the 1976 World Team Olympiad in Monte Carlo, where Great Britain placed third. He was Britain's non-playing captain in the 1981 European Team Championships in Birmingham, England, placing second. Thus Great Britain qualified for the 1981 Bermuda Bowl, but the WBF credentials committee rejected Reese as captain, citing "writings and opinions expressed by Mr. Reese that were considered not in the best interests of the game", in the words of New York Times bridge editor Alan Truscott—primarily the "sordid picture of top-level bridge" presented by Reese and Jeremy Flint in their 1979 novel Trick Thirteen. Britain appealed to the WBF executive council but Reese chose to remain home.

Preferring backgammon as an alternative in his later years, Reese played little competitive bridge, owing in part to increasing deafness. However, his career as a bridge writer continued unabated.

=== The Little Major ===
The concept for "the Little Major was born" in late 1962, while Reese was en route to a tournament in the Canary Islands with Boris Schapiro.

First with Schapiro and then Jeremy Flint, Reese initially created the Little Major bidding system as a warning of what would happen if the development of artificial bidding systems was allowed to go unchecked. However, under this camouflage, the system was a genuine attempt with interesting features. Ultimately, the system was abandoned when its two-year EBU 'A' license was withdrawn "on the grounds that not enough players were playing the system".

=== Opinions of Reese ===
Reese's long-time partner, Boris Schapiro, put his opinion in a 1951 bridge magazine article:

"Terence Reese: brilliant, tenacious and imaginative; any amount of courage, very good bidder, immaculate dummy player and defender, never puts pressure on partner. Concentration first class; difficult to play against."

Eleven years later, Schapiro still thought Reese was the best player in the country:

"Reese is still the best, and in my opinion by a greater margin than before. His dummy and defence are as immaculate as ever, and the old gentleman has actually polished up his bidding. Believe it or not, he has condescended to play 'fourth suit forcing' and Stayman, and I strongly suspect that by 1973 he will be giving the Baron system a close look."

Upon Reese's death in 1996, Schapiro wrote:

"... Terence was the best player, one of only two geniuses I have known. The other was Lasker, the chess player. Terence was not a slow player but occasionally he went into a trance. I didn't mind and could sit there and wait. I knew that when he eventually played a card it would be the right one."

Victor Mollo had this to say about Reese in 1967:

Terence Reese is, perhaps, the best bridge player in the world. Cold, aloof, dispassionate, he has many admirers... and a host of enemies. Intelligence of a high order ... the impression of a one-sided but very unusual personality.

Alan Truscott wrote in The New York Times two weeks after Reese's death:

"Reese was even more famous as a newspaper columnist, a theorist and a writer. Two of his early books, Reese on Play and The Expert Game, were classics, and are still read by every serious student of bridge."

== The Buenos Aires affair ==
In the 1965 Buenos Aires Bermuda Bowl, B. Jay Becker noticed Reese and his partner, Boris Schapiro, holding their cards in what he regarded as unusual ways during bidding; the claim that was made was the number of fingers showing indicated the length of the heart suit. A number of players and observers, including Dorothy Hayden, New York Times columnist Alan Truscott, John Gerber, British nonplaying captain Ralph Swimer, British Bridge League Chairman Geoffrey Butler, ACBL president emeritus Waldemar von Zedtwitz, and ACBL President Robin McNabb, all watched Reese and Schapiro and were convinced that they were signalling illegally. It was also confirmed that Reese was not using such signals while playing with his other partner, Jeremy Flint. At a hearing held at the tournament site in Buenos Aires, the World Bridge Federation (WBF) judged Reese and Schapiro guilty of cheating, and announced that due to "certain irregularities", the British team was forfeiting the matches they had already won against North America and Argentina, and that Reese and Shapiro would not be playing in the remaining matches.

The British Bridge League (BBL) subsequently convened their own enquiry, chaired by Sir John Foster, barrister and Member of Parliament, and General Lord Bourne. After a hearing lasting many months, including a surprise revelation by Swimer that Schapiro had confessed his guilt to him - though Swimer never mentioned this at the Hearing in Buenos Aires - the "Foster Enquiry" rebutted much of the evidence. They pointed out that the Hearing itself in Buenos Aires had a number of unsatisfactory features; there was no proof that the finger signals communicated any more information than bidding would have done; the impact of the Reese & Schapiro team could not have affected the result of at least one of the matches at issue (vs Argentina); 'Mr Kehela the Vice-Captain and Coach of the (USA) team, stated that he had come to the conclusion that the two players accused were not cheating’; and other salient points. The BBL Inquiry did not merely find that there was inconclusive evidence that the players had benefitted from the signals in their bidding or play but rather 'We find that Messrs. Reese and Schapiro were not guilty of cheating at the Tournament in question'.

In 1967, the BBL asked the WBF to reverse their guilty finding; the WBF responded by unanimously reaffirming their guilty verdict, and later reiterating that they would not accept a British team including Reese and Schapiro for the 1968 Olympiad, which the BBL boycotted in protest. In 1968, a compromise was reached, the WBF maintaining their guilty verdict, but allowing Reese and Schapiro (who had announced his retirement from international bridge after the Buenos Aires Olympiad) to play in future world championships.

Subsequently, both Reese and Alan Truscott published books on the scandal. Reese's book stated: "The basis of the charge, as everybody knows, is that Schapiro and I communicated length in hearts to one another by means of illegal signals. If you want to support that charge by reference to the hands played, what you have to show is that a number of illogical, uncharacteristic, and implausible bids or plays were made that can be explained only on the basis that the players had improper knowledge of one another's hands." It then goes on to argue for the logic of the pair's bidding and play on the various hands from the Olympiad. Truscott's book emphasizes the unlikelihood of the observed variations in finger signals being coincidental, or of such a large number of witnesses colluding to fabricate the evidence. It also recounts a number of previous cheating accusations against Reese and Schapiro (including games other than bridge), some by others as early as 1955.

In May 2005, the English journalist David Rex-Taylor, a bridge player and publisher, claimed that Reese had made a confession to him forty years earlier, one that was not to be revealed until 2005 and after he and Schapiro were dead. The purported confession claimed that Reese and Schapiro were indeed signalling, but only to show that such signaling was possible (and so were not actually paying attention to each other's signals), purportedly as part of a book on cheating (which was abandoned after the scandal broke). Although this explanation could conceivably reconcile the use of finger signals with the absence of evidence from bidding or play, there is no corroborating evidence to support this account. In contrast, Schapiro's widow claims he continued to deny the accusations to his death.

== Career as a bridge author ==
Reese also had a successful career as a bridge author and journalist, a career that lasted throughout his life. He was one of the most influential and acerbic of bridge writers, with a large output (over ninety titles), including several books which remain in print as classics of bridge play. He was also the long-time bridge correspondent of The Lady, The Observer, the London Evening News and the Evening Standard. He was also a frequent contributor to The Bridge World magazine which gave the following response to criticism of their continuing to publish articles by him after the Buenos Aires affair:

We have received several letters questioning our decision to publish articles by Terence Reese, in view of the World Bridge Federation ruling that he was guilty. Naturally, we received an equal number of letters from subscribers who vigorously applauded the appearance of this material, in view of the not-guilty verdict rendered by the British Bridge League following its enquiry. As we see it, our own opinion on this case would have no bearing. The official position in this matter certainly must be regarded as muddled. Therefore, we see no choice but to disregard this case and judge material received on its merit.

— The Editors, The Bridge World, June 1968, Volume 39, Issue 9, page 3.

Reese contributed to the Acol bidding system originally developed by Maurice Harrison-Gray, Jack Marx and S.J.("Skid") Simon in the late 1920s and early 1930s and co-authored the first textbook on it with Ben Cohen in 1938. Named after the Acol Bridge Club in North London (located on Acol Road at the time), it became the prevailing bidding system in Britain and some other parts of the world. The book and its subsequent editions in 1939, 1946 and 1949 gave unity to what was otherwise a rather free-wheeling bidding system. His later adaptation of Garozzo and Yallouze's book on the Blue Club and his book on the Precision Club were widely used by devotees of strong club systems, and by their opponents as references.

The great success of Reese on Play (an outstanding guide to dummy play and defence) was followed by an even more ambitious work. The Expert Game was the book which really made his name. As the title suggests, it dealt with card play at the highest level, including some ideas that were novel at the time, for instance, inferences from events that did not occur, and the principle of restricted choice. Examples of bridge logic abound in Reese, for instance, a player who overcalls but does not lead his suit is likely to lack one or two key honours; this concept is often called 'the dog that did not bark in the night' (after Sherlock Holmes in Arthur Conan Doyle's "The Adventure of Silver Blaze"). Another form of logic can be seen in 'If it must be so, assume it is so'. His examples of counting (and other ways of drawing inferences from the bidding and play) spread such ideas from a coterie of masters in London (or New York) to a much wider group of nascent experts. For at least twenty years after this book was published, one could be sure that virtually every top-class player had studied it minutely.

Reese also had the distinction of creating several new genres of bridge book. The most significant was the 'Over my shoulder' genre, where the reader is taken through the master's thinking as the bidding and play proceeds through the hand. Play Bridge with Reese was the model for several such works. Develop Your Bidding Judgment was another such work.

Later, Reese made use of the growing library of hands from international competitions to create interesting quiz-type books, where the discussion was usually on the verso of the page which presented the problem. Famous Hands from Famous Matches was the first of these, followed by Famous Bidding Decisions and Famous Play Decisions, all written with David Bird. In his career as a writer, Reese had a number of co-authors, mostly highly competent players and writers, yet all his books were in his inimitable style. Another of his ideas was to raid the stock of hands in bridge magazine bidding competitions for interesting and instructive hands. What Would You Bid? was the result.

Reese also wrote books on poker, casino gambling, canasta and backgammon.

== Photographs ==
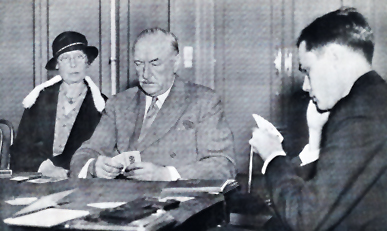
On right is probably the young Terence Reese during a practice match with Henry 'Pops' Beasley at Grosvenor House before the 1933 match v Culbertson
