= Bridge Great Britain =

British card game organisation

Bridge Great Britain is an organisation which was formed to continue the organisational functions of the British Bridge League from 1 January 2000 when that body was dissolved at the end of 1999. It organises the Gold Cup and several annual international bridge competitions between teams representing England, Northern Ireland, the Republic of Ireland, Scotland, and Wales; including the Camrose Trophy and like events.

== See also ==
- List of bridge competitions and awards
