= David Bakhshi =

English bridge player

David Bakhshi is an English bridge player.

== Bridge accomplishments ==
=== Wins ===
- Gold Cup (5) 2002, 2004, 2007, 2009, 2014
- North American Bridge Championships (1)
  - Silodor Open Pairs (1) 2013

=== Runners-up ===
- North American Bridge Championships (1)
  - Vanderbilt (1) 2011
