= Camrose Trophy =

Contract bridge competition

The Camrose Trophy

The Camrose Trophy or "The Camrose" is an annual bridge competition among open teams representing the home nations of Great Britain and Ireland: England (EBU), Northern Ireland (NIBU), Republic of Ireland (CBAI), Scotland (SBU) and Wales (WBU). As such it is the open teams-of-four component of the "Home Internationals" organised by Bridge Great Britain.

The competition was first held in 1937, but it did not become the Camrose until the following year, when Lord Camrose, owner of The Daily Telegraph, donated the trophy. The original trophy has been lost and replaced. Because of World War II the series was interrupted mid-way in 1939 and not resumed until 1946, yet the Camrose is the world's most-played international bridge series.

Beside "The Camrose" (Open flight), the Home Bridge Internationals include annual series for Women from 1950 (the Lady Milne Trophy), Juniors from 1971, Under-19 from 1990 (the Peggy Bayer Trophy), and Seniors (the Teltscher Trophy) from 2008.

== Structure ==
Since 2007 there have been six rather than five teams in the competition, to avoid having one team sit out each round. From 2007 to 2009 the sixth team was the defending champion, so there were two teams from the previous year's winning nation. England's second team won in 2009, when it was the final-round host by coincidence. Since then by design the sixth team is a second team from the final-round host nation, which follows a five-year cycle from Northern Ireland in 2010 to England in 2014. That second representative is named for the national bridge federation; thus "Wales" and "Welsh Bridge Union" both entered in 2011.

Since 2005 a double round-robin is scheduled on two weekends. With six teams, each weekend comprises five rounds of three head-to-head matches, a single round-robin. A match is now 32 deals scored at IMPs and converted to victory points (VP). So every team plays 320 deals in the entire event, 64 against each of its rivals. Before 2005, the teams played head-to-head matches over five weekends.

Before 2007 there were simply five national teams, or four during the 48-year absence by the Republic of Ireland from 1951 to 1998.

== Results ==
England won both of the completed pre-war and the first 15 post-war contests, through 1960. Only England and Scotland were winners in the 56 renditions before year 2000, including England–Scotland ties in 1961, 1972 and 1973. Ireland first won in 2000 and won four straight beginning 2005. Wales won its first Camrose in 2011, but England are again dominant, winning the six most recent contests and twelve times in the last fifteen years.

=== Winners by nation ===
The competition has been completed 80 times up to 2023. There was an outright winner on each occasion except for 1961, 1972 and 1973, when England and Scotland tied for first place. England's count includes wins in 2009 and in 2019 by its second team, "English Bridge Union".

Nation	Outright wins	Tied wins
England	57	3
Scotland	12	3
Republic of Ireland	7	0
Wales	1	0
Northern Ireland	0	0

=== Winners by year ===
Four times in the 21st century (*), the winners have been one of two entries from their countries, namely "Ireland" 2008, "EBU" 2009 and 2019 (English Bridge Union), and "Wales" 2011. They were the defending champion team, the England "B" teams, and the Wales "A" team respectively. Their compatriots were "Hosts Ireland", "England", and "WBU" (Welsh Bridge Union).

Year	Winners
2023	England
2022	England
2021	England
2020	England
2019 *	England
2018	England
2017	Republic of Ireland
2016	England
2015	Republic of Ireland
2014	England
2013	England
2012	England
2011 *	Wales
2010	England
2009 *	England
2008 *	Republic of Ireland
2007	Republic of Ireland
2006	Republic of Ireland
2005	Republic of Ireland
2004	England
2003	England
2002	England
2001	England
2000	Republic of Ireland
1999	England
1998	Scotland
1997	England
1996	Scotland
1995	England
1994	England
1993	England
1992	England
1991	England
1990	England
1989	Scotland
1988	England
1987	England
1986	England
1985	England
1984	England
1983	England
1982	England
1981	England
1980	England
1979	Scotland
1978	England
1977	Scotland
1976	Scotland
1975	England
1974	Scotland
1973	Scotland and England (tie)
1972	Scotland and England (tie)
1971	Scotland
1970	Scotland
1969	England
1968	England
1967	Scotland
1966	England
1965	Scotland
1964	Scotland
1963	England
1962	England
1961	Scotland and England (tie)
1960	England
1959	England
1958	England
1957	England
1956	England
1955	England
1954	England
1953	England
1952	England
1951	England
1950	England
1949	England
1948	England
1947	England
1946	England
1945	Not Contested
1944	Not Contested
1943	Not Contested
1942	Not Contested
1941	Not Contested
1940	Not Contested
1939	Contest incomplete
1938	England
1937	England

The 1939 contest was not completed and the next six did not take place because of World War II.

== Players ==
Teams competition in bridge requires a minimum of four players on each team; up to two additional players may be added as alternates. Two tables are in play at the same time with the North–South pair at one table and East–West pair at the other table being teammates.

Camrose matches comprise two sets of 16 deals with player substitutions permitted between sets. Since 2007 the annual event comprises ten matches for each national team; previously there were eight or six matches. All 2011 participants played in 80 to 144 of 160 deals on the second weekend, or five to nine of ten sets (five matches), led by Rex Anderson and David Greenwood who played nine sets for Northern Ireland. Anderson is the career leader with 114 matches played (through 2023).

Career Leaders by Nation
Nation	Player	Matches up to 2023
Northern Ireland	Rex Anderson	114
Wales	Patrick Jourdain *	77 (also 2 for Scotland in 1977)
Scotland	Les Steel	59
England	John Armstrong	41
Republic of Ireland	Tom Hanlon	48

Totals taken from the BGB website and exclude any matches as non-playing captain.

== Trophies ==
Trophies are awarded for each match, in addition to the overall trophy.

Trophies for Individual matches
Trophy Name	Match
Pat Cotter Trophy	England v Scotland
Billy Kelso Trophy	England v Northern Ireland
Joe Moran Trophy	England v Republic of Ireland
Alan Pierce Trophy	England v Wales
Ken Baxter Salver	Scotland v Northern Ireland
Cupa Cairdeas	Scotland v Republic of Ireland
Patrick Jourdain Trophy	Scotland v Wales
Col. Walshe Trophy	Republic of Ireland v Northern Ireland
Cyfeillion Beiriste Trophy	Republic of Ireland v Wales
Causeway Trophy	Wales v Northern Ireland
