= Tony Forrester =

English bridge player

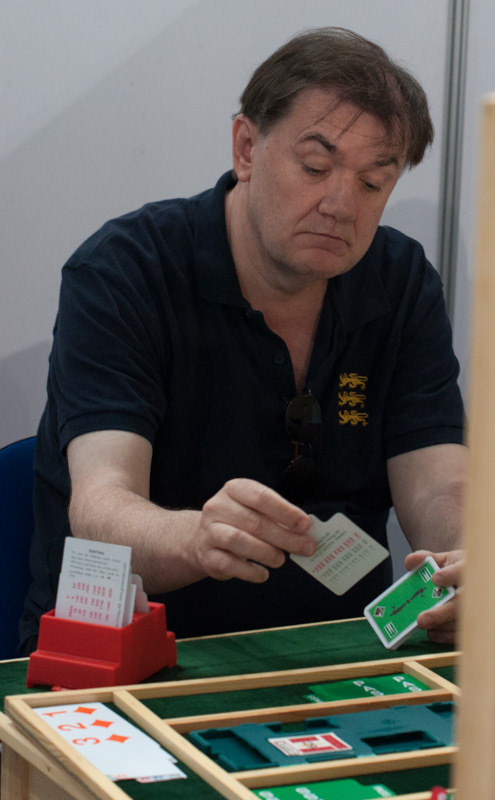
- Forrester in 2014
- Born: 1953 (age 72–73)
- Occupations: Bridge player and writer
- Spouse: Diana
- Writing career
- Language: English
- Genre: Non-fiction – contract bridge

Anthony R. (Tony) Forrester (born 1953) is an English bridge player and writer. He is a British and English international and a World Bridge Federation World International Master. Forrester was a bridge columnist for The Daily Telegraph from 1993 until 2019 and for The Sunday Telegraph from 1996 until 2019.

== Personal life ==
Forrester was brought up in West Yorkshire. He is married to Diana, and they live in Gloucestershire.

== International honours ==
Forrester won the European Youth Team Championship in 1978 and the European Team Championship in 1991. The European Team Championship win was in partnership with Andrew Robson, with whom he played for seven years. The pair also won the Cap Gemini and the Sunday Times-Macallan. Since that time he was regarded, by the English Bridge Union, as England's number one player.

Playing for Rita Shugart's team, in 1998 he was the first Briton, with teammate Robson, to win a prestigious US Major, the Reisinger, and the same squad won the event a second time the following year. Forrester has won the US Board-a-Match Teams on two occasions, 1999 and 2013.

In 2014 he and Robson revived their partnership, and played together as part of the England team in that year's European Open Championship. The team finished second, thereby winning the silver medal and qualifying for the finals of the 2015 World Championships.

With 43 caps for England in the Camrose Trophy, Forrester is Britain's most capped player.

== Domestic honours ==
Forrester has won the Gold Cup, the premier British teams competition, 14 times: in 1983, 1986, 1989, 1990, 1992, 1993, 2000, 2001, 2007, 2009, 2012, 2013, 2014 and 2019, putting him first in the all-time list. He won the Spring Foursomes in 1983, 1996, 1999, 2009, 2016, 2017, 2018 and 2022. His eight victories represent an all-time record. He has won the Crockfords Cup (English Teams of Four Championship) a record ten times: 1982, 1985, 1987, 1990, 1995, 1999, 2001, 2008, 2012 and 2019 He has won the Premier League on seven occasions.

In 2010, he won the Brighton Four Stars A Final, with teammates Alexander Allfrey, Andrew Robson and Peter Crouch.

In 2015 he was one of the first two winners of the English Bridge Union's Diamond Award, introduced to recognise players who have "represented England (and earlier Great Britain) with distinction over a long period".

== Publications ==
- Forrester, Tony (1993). Secrets of Success (Faber Bridge Books). London: Faber and Faber.
- Forrester, Tony; Senior, Brian (1994). Over Your Shoulder: Learn from the Experts. Batsford Ltd. ISBN 978-0-7134-7638-5.
- Forrester, Tony (1994). Play Bridge at Home (Daily Telegraph). Batsford Ltd. ISBN 978-0-7134-7646-0.
- Forrester, Tony (1995). "Daily Telegraph" Improve Your Bridge at Home (Batsford Bridge). Batsford Ltd. ISBN 978-0-7134-7779-5.
- Forrester, Tony (1996). "Daily Telegraph" Winning Bridge at Home (Batsford Bridge). Batsford Ltd. ISBN 978-0-7134-7780-1.
- Forrester, Tony (1997). The Bridge Player's Bedside Book. R&L Yeatman. ISBN 978-0-905899-61-9.
- Forrester, Tony; Bird, David (1997). Secrets of Expert Cardplay. Batsford Ltd. ISBN 978-0-7134-8281-2.
- Forrester, Tony (1998). Vintage Forrester: Selected Writings from the "Daily Telegraph" (A Batsford bridge book). Batsford Ltd. ISBN 978-0-7134-8292-8
- Forrester, Tony; Bird, David (1999). Secrets of Expert Defence. Batsford Ltd. ISBN 978-0-7134-8330-7.
