= Mike Bell (bridge) =

English bridge player

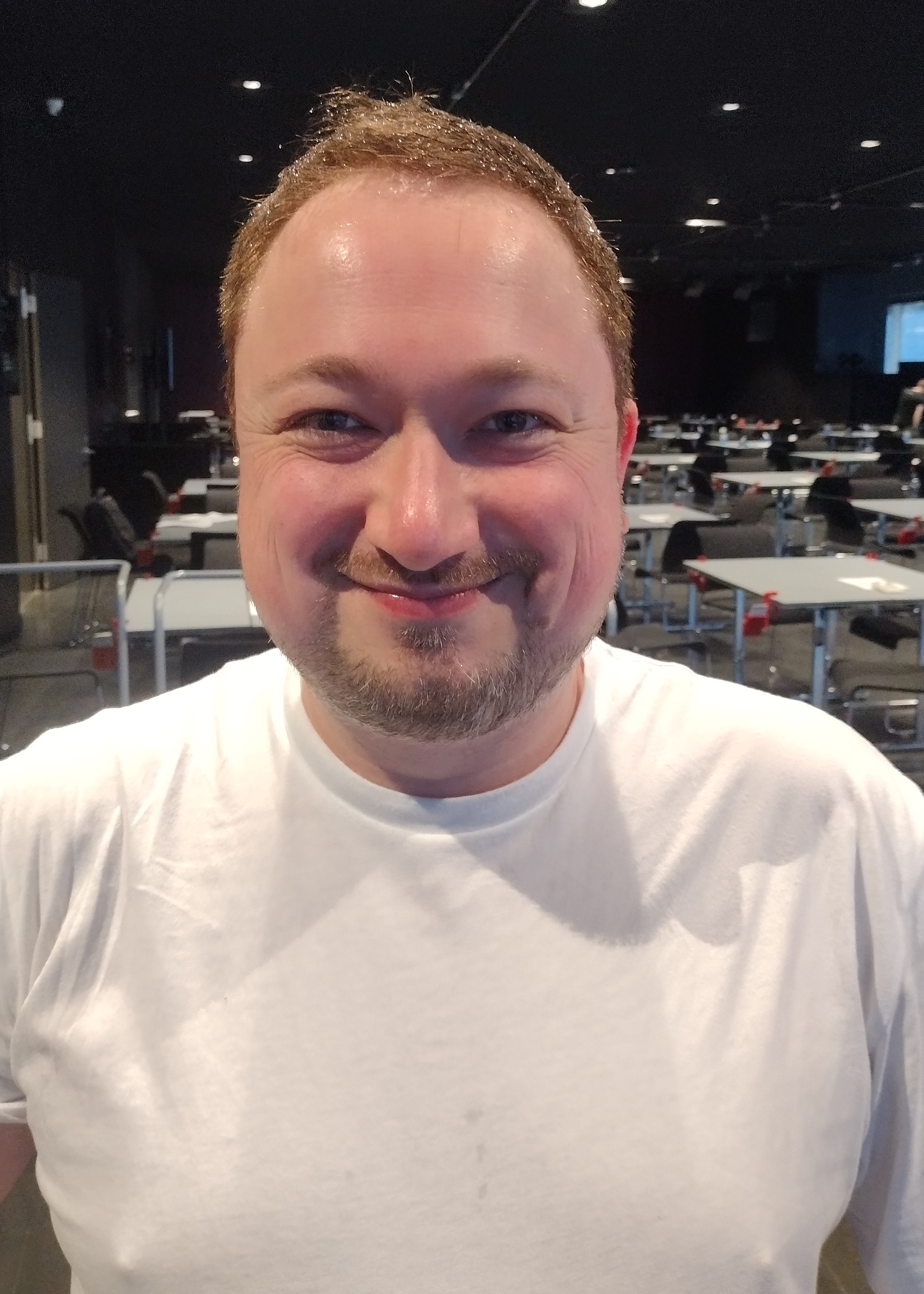
- Mike Bell at the Iceland Bridge Festival, January 2024
- Born: Michael Bell; October 17, 1984 (age 41); Reading

Mike Bell (born 17 October 1984) is an English bridge player.

== Bridge accomplishments ==
- EBU Player of the Year, 2017-2018

=== Wins ===
- English Bridge Union Schapiro Spring Foursomes: 2016, 2017, 2018
- Mitchell Board-a-Match Teams: 2017

== Personal life ==
Mike is married to Sarah Bell, a professional bridge player and champion.
