= Andrew Robson =

British bridge player (born 1964)

Andrew Robson OBE
- Born: Andrew Michael Robson; 1964 (age 61–62)
- Occupations: Bridge player, teacher, club owner
- Writing career
- Period: 1988–present (as player)
- Subject: Contract bridge instruction
- Website: www.andrewrobson.co.uk

Andrew Michael Robson OBE (born 1964) is an English professional bridge player, writer and teacher. He is a British and English international. Robson is the bridge columnist for The Times and Country Life. He was a member of the Great Britain Juniors team that won the World Youth Team Championship in 1989, and of the Great Britain Open team that won the European Open Teams Championship in 1991. He is from London.

== Personal life ==
Robson attended Abingdon School as a dayboy in Randolph House from 1977 to 1982. He obtained a BSc at the University of Bristol in 1985, and a Cert Ed the following year.

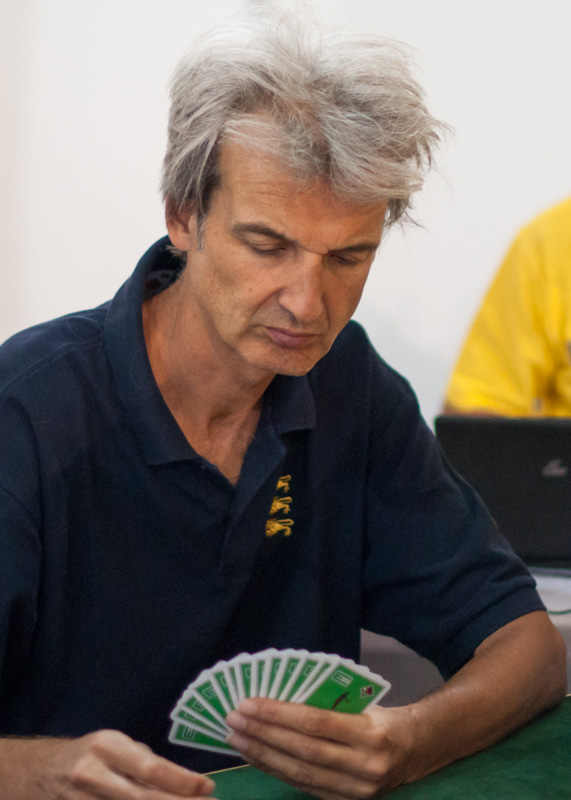
Andrew Robson

In 2001 he suffered serious injuries when he slipped on ice when hill-walking in the Lake District and fell thirty feet. He broke many bones, spent two months in hospital and was in a wheelchair for much longer. Robson was able to return to the bridge table five months after the accident, the speed of his recovery astonishing his doctors. As a result, he received the International Bridge Press Association (IBPA) Sportmanship Award in 2002 "for his spectacular recovery from adversity". He was also the joint winner of the IBPA's Bridge Personality of the Year award in 2013.

He is married and has two daughters.

== Bridge career ==
As well as winning the World Youth Team Championship in 1989 Robson was also a member of the team which won the junior Common Market Championship the same year, on both occasions partnering John Pottage.

On turning 25, later that year, he was no longer eligible for junior events, and Tony Forrester proposed that they should form a partnership. This lasted for seven years and was highly successful. They were part of the team which won the European Open Championship in 1991, and amongst the pairs events which they won were the prestigious Cap Gemini and Sunday Times-Macallan.

After his partnership with Forrester broke up, Robson played on a number of occasions with Zia Mahmood, with whom he won the Cap Gemini two more times. He has also partnered David Bakhshi, with whom he won the Gold Cup in 2002, and Alexander Allfrey, who was a teammate when he won the Gold Cup a second time in 2004. Robson has since had five further wins in 2007, 2009, 2012, 2013 and 2014. He has also played a large amount in the United States, partnering Rita Shugart. In 1998 he was the first Briton, with teammate Forrester, to win a prestigious US Major, the Reisinger, and the same squad won the event a second time the following year.

In 2014 he and Forrester revived their partnership, and played together as part of the England team in that year's European Open Championship. The team finished third, thereby winning the bronze medal and qualifying for the finals of the 2015 World Championships.

As well as his daily column in The Times, Robson writes a column for the weekly magazine Country Life. In the past he has also written for The Oldie, The Spectator and the Express on Sunday.

In addition to the books that Robson has written (see Bibliography below), in 2008 he produced a DVD entitled Play Modern Bridge, and he is also responsible for five instructional CDs.

He opened his own bridge club, The Andrew Robson Bridge Club, in London in 1995.

Robson has put his training as a schoolteacher to good use by heading many instructional seminars around the UK, as well as hosting master classes and charity bridge events and teaching at his club.

He was appointed Officer of the Order of the British Empire (OBE) in the 2013 New Year Honours for services to bridge and charity. Later the same year he was the joint winner of Personality of the Year at the International Bridge Press Association's annual awards, together with Netherlands' Bauke Muller.

In 2018 he was a winner of the English Bridge Union's Diamond Award, introduced to recognise players "in recognition of excellence and success over a sustained period for England's international teams".

== Bridge accomplishments ==
=== Wins ===
- Gold Cup (7) 2002, 2004, 2007, 2009, 2012, 2013, 2014
- North American Bridge Championships (3)
  - Mitchell Board-a-Match Teams (1) 1999
  - Reisinger (2) 1998, 1999

=== Runners-up ===
- Gold Cup (2) 1991, 2011
- North American Bridge Championships (1)
  - Chicago Mixed Board-a-Match (1) 1998

== Bibliography ==
- Robson, Andrew; Segal, Oliver (1993). Partnership Bidding at Bridge/The Contested Auction. London: Faber & Faber. p. 408. ISBN 978-0-571-16432-5. OCLC 29357782. – (1993) Los Alamitos, CA: C&T Bridge Supplies, pp. 408. ISBN 978-0-9628297-3-4 OCLC 32361687.
- Robson, Andrew (2005). Common Mistakes and How to Avoid Them. London: Times Books. p. 205. ISBN 978-0-00-720410-6. OCLC 271857261.
- Robson, Andrew (2006). Bridge Lessons: Double. London: Andrew Robson Bridge Club. p. 40.
- Robson, Andrew (2006). Bridge Lessons: Finesse. London: Andrew Robson Bridge Club. p. 36. ISBN 978-0-9552942-2-8. OCLC 713600273.
- Robson, Andrew (2006). Bridge Lessons: Opening Lead. London: Andrew Robson Bridge Club. p. 40.
- Robson, Andrew (2006). Bridge Lessons: Overcall. London: Andrew Robson Bridge Club. p. 35. ISBN 978-0-9552942-1-1. OCLC 713600272.
- Robson, Andrew (2006). Bridge Lessons: Slam. London: Andrew Robson Bridge Club. p. 50.
- Robson, Andrew (2006). Bridge Lessons: Stayman and Transfer. London: Andrew Robson Bridge Club. p. 44. ISBN 978-0-9552942-4-2. OCLC 713600275.
- Robson, Andrew (2006). Bridge Lessons: Weak Two. London: Andrew Robson Bridge Club. p. 44. ISBN 978-0-9552942-3-5. OCLC 713600274.
- Robson, Andrew (2007). Bridge Lessons: Endplay and Squeezes. London: Andrew Robson Bridge Club. p. 40.
- Robson, Andrew (2007). Bridge Lessons: Signal and Discard. London: Andrew Robson Bridge Club. p. 40.
- Robson, Andrew (2008). Bridge Lessons: Bidding as Opener. London: Andrew Robson Bridge Club. p. 43.
- Robson, Andrew (2008). Bridge Lessons: Responder and Fourth Suit Forcing. London: Andrew Robson Bridge Club. p. 50.
- Robson, Andrew (2007). Bridge Secrets. London: HarperCollins Publishers. p. 221. ISBN 978-0-00-724939-8.
- Robson, Andrew (2009). Bridge: What Should Have Happened. London: Andrew Robson Bridge Club. p. 251. ISBN 978-0-9557818-5-8. OCLC 631458130.
- Robson, Andrew (2008). Need to Know?/Bridge. London: Collins. p. 191.
- Robson, Andrew (2009) [2007]. Essential Bridge Flipper. London: Andrew Robson Bridge Club. p. 26.
- Robson, Andrew (2007). Beginner Bridge Flipper. London: Andrew Robson Bridge Club. p. 26.
- Robson, Andrew (2010). Bridge Lessons: Defence. London: Andrew Robson Bridge Club. p. 64. ISBN 978-0955781889. OCLC 271857261.
- 'People who Train People: An interview with Andrew Robson'. (2017) The Teacher Trainer Vol. 31. No. 2. Pilgrims: Canterbury. P 16.

== Videography ==
- Play Modern Bridge. 2005
- Learn Bridge. 2011
- The Next Level. (7 hours 10 minutes). 2018

== See also ==
- List of Old Abingdonians
