= David Gold (bridge) =

English bridge player

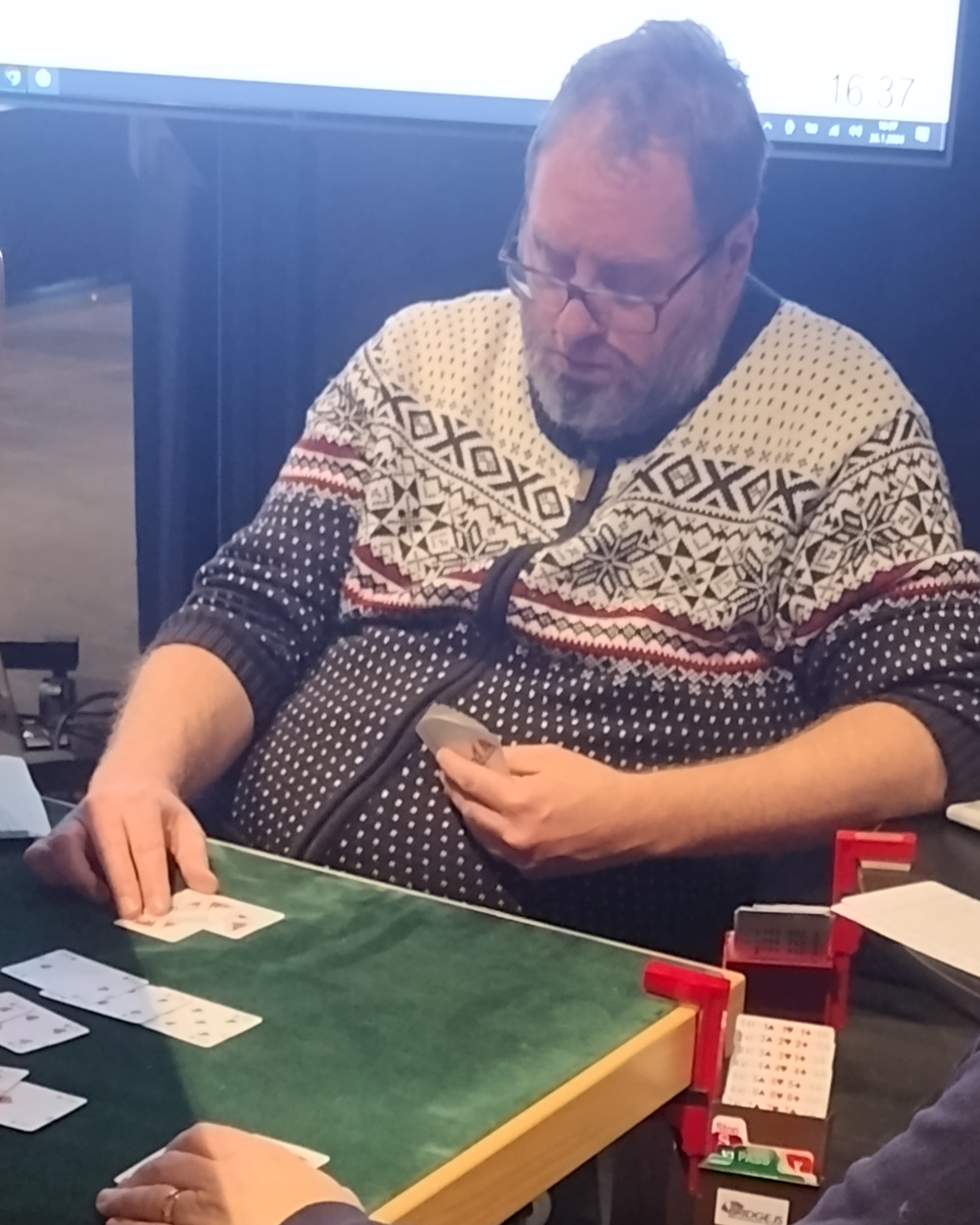
- David Gold at Iceland Bridge Festival, January 2024
- Born: David Gold

David Gold is an English bridge player.

== Bridge accomplishments ==
=== Wins ===
- Gold Cup (5) 2012, 2013, 2014, 2019, 2022
- Premier League Winner (8) 2008, 2011, 2013, 2014, 2016, 2017, 2018, 2021
- Spring Fours Winner (3) 2016, 2017, 2018
- Crockfords Winner 2012

=== International Medals ===
- Bronze European Pairs Tenerife 2005
- Silver World Olympiad Teams Championship (1) 2008
- Silver European Teams Championships Opatija 2014
- Bronze World Transnationals Lyon 2017
- Bronze Champion's Cup 2018 Eilat
- Silver Champions Cup Bucharest 2019
- Bronze World Bridge Championships Open Teams 2022

=== North American Bridge Championships ===
- Winner of 2017 Board-A-Match
- Winner of 2023 Vanderbilt
- Runner Up of 2016 Board-A-Match
- Runner Up of 2017 Vanderbilt
- 3rd 2017 Spingold
- Runner up LM pairs 2015 & 2018
- 3rd Reisinger 2010
