= Gold Cup (bridge) =

British contract bridge competition

The Gold Cup is the premier open British contract bridge competition for teams of four. (Teams may comprise up to six players but only four take part at any one time.) It was first contested in the 1931/32 season, making it one of the oldest contract bridge tournaments anywhere. The event was run by the British Bridge League through 1999 and subsequently by Bridge Great Britain, a newly formed not-for-profit organisation. Except for 1933/34 the format has always been single-elimination (knock-out).

The 2019 Gold Cup was the 82nd. There were eight annual competitions before 1940 and 74 more have been completed since its resumption in 1946.

Currently there are eight rounds to handle as many as 256 entries, with at least 32 deals in the first round, subsequently 48 or more.

Boris Schapiro played on 11 winning teams, with 52 years between his first success in 1945/46 and his last in 1997/98. Tony Forrester equalled his record when he was a winner in 2012 and surpassed it when he won again in 2013; his first win was in 1983. His win in 2019 was his fourteenth. Terence Reese had 8 wins.

== See also ==
- Camrose Trophy
