= Jim Jacoby =

American businessman

- Born: James Frederick Jacoby; September 6, 1943 (age 83); Miami, Florida, U.S.
- Education: Miami Dade College
- Occupation: real estate developer
- Board member of: Georgia Aquarium; Guy Harvey Ocean Foundation; Savannah College of Art and Design; Whitney Laboratory for Marine Bioscience; Epilepsy Foundation
- Spouse: Jan
- Military career
- Branch: United States Navy
- Service years: 1961–1969
- Rank: Petty officer first class E-6
- Unit: Naval Security Group

James F. "Jim" Jacoby is an American businessman based out of Atlanta, Georgia. Jacoby is the founder, CEO and chairman of The Jacoby Group, Inc., a synergistic group of operating companies headquartered in Atlanta, Georgia. The nationally recognized Jacoby Development, Inc., a land development company that specializes multi-use properties in environmentally sensitive areas and reclamation of brownfields, is a member of the group.

== Early life ==
Jacoby was born in 1943 in Miami, Florida, the fourth and youngest child of Phebe and Dewey Jacoby. From an early age, he showed interest in all facets of math and business and was the most entrepreneurial of his siblings. After high school he served from 1961 to 1969 in intelligence with the Naval Security Group, during which he was stationed in the Philippines, Germany and the United States. After serving in the military, he attended Miami-Dade Community College and subsequently moved to Atlanta, Georgia.

== Career ==
Jacoby was a leasing agent of retail and industrial buildings for six years. The Savings and loan crisis prompted Jacoby to launch his entrepreneurial career in real estate scouting and assembling sites for developing and redeveloping various projects. He helped create downtown development authorities and used tax-free bonds to finance retail projects. The company soon progressed to developing stores and strip malls.

== Business Ventures ==
=== Bi-Lo ===
His big break came when Bi-Lo grocery stores requested that Jacoby handle development for the company, which also agreed to back Jacoby financially. Following his success with Bi-Lo, the company was offered numerous other projects.

=== Walmart ===
In 1987, Walmart contracted with Jacoby to develop several retail stores in Georgia. JDI created retail centers in Douglasville, Austell and Villa Rica, Georgia; then Timonium, Maryland. With the Walmart success, Jacoby founded Jacoby Development, Inc. and became the "preferred" developer of Walmart stores. Jacoby eventually developed 44 shopping centers, including 25 with Walmart or Sam's Club-anchors on the East Coast. Jacoby became more sensitive about environmental issues when JDI built a Walmart project in South Carolina. Jacoby viewed it as a learning experience and stated: "I would say we got our education at the University of Hilton Head when we did the Walmart and Publix at Hilton Head Island." Hilton Head is a community where the people believe strongly about environmental impacts.

=== Atlantic Station ===
In 1997, Jacoby contracted the site of the former 138 acres (56 ha) Atlantic Steel mill in Atlanta, Georgia in partnership with AIG and in 1999 they collectively built the $2 billion Atlantic Station, now widely used as a case study for successful transformation of a brownfield site to a LEED certified campus. During the project, Atlanta's bad air quality resulted in a moratorium for road construction, threatening shutdown of work. Jacoby was fortunate to receive an EPA Project XL designation, intended to allow companies to circumvent environmental regulations if it results in improved quality of land, water or air. Atlantic Station was the first LEED certified campus in the U.S. and includes offices, retail, residences, hotel, a major grocery store, restaurants, a movie theater, and more. During the ten years required for creating this livable and workable space, Jacoby took on the cleaning of the former steel mill site, and laid out the infrastructure, including a bridge across I-75 and I-85 to connect Atlantic Station with the east side of Midtown Atlanta.

=== Change in direction ===
Describing his feelings as a crisis of consciousness, Jacoby realized that his goal was to build more than just shopping centers; he was interested in creating healthy communities that would last for years to come. A visionary, Jacoby began focusing on environmentally friendly and long-term sustainable development before it became a trend. Jim's interest in new and emerging industries, including alternative energy, media and the biotechnology industry, has resulted in the founding of several companies.

=== Marineland ===
In 2001 Jacoby acquired 40 acres (16 ha) of the aging Marineland property just south of St. Augustine, Florida for $1.4 million. Originally built in 1938 to film underwater scenes and movies, Marineland morphed into a Florida tourist attraction featuring aquatic life exhibits and dolphin shows. After it was damaged by Hurricane Irene (1999), Jacoby acquired the dolphin attraction as well as related real estate and redeveloped the entire park to a modern dolphin facility focused on education and animal/human interaction and formed an operating partnership with the Georgia Aquarium. Marineland reopened in 2006 with new programs and experiences available to the public. On New Year's Day, 2011, Jacoby sold Marineland to the Georgia Aquarium.

=== Aerotropolis ===
Atlanta Assembly, a decommissioned Ford Taurus automobile plant in Hapeville, Georgia adjacent to the Hartsfield-Jackson Atlanta International Airport, was acquired by Jacoby in 2008. The plant was demolished and the site remediated, and re-christened Aerotropolis Atlanta. The site has been subdivided, and portions have been sold to buyers, including Porsche and the Atlanta Hartsfield-Jackson International Airport. On November 27, 2012, Porsche broke ground for construction of its new North American Headquarters and driving experience center, located at One Porsche Drive, which will be anchor of the redevelopment.

=== Whitemarsh ===
In 1999, Jacoby acquired a former 196 acres (79 ha) asphalt production site in Whitemarsh, Maryland. The redevelopment of the site, which included clean-up of contaminated groundwater and soils has become one of the largest brownfield redevelopments in the state of Maryland. The site is now home to a 65 acres (26 ha) General Motors Baltimore Transmission plant with 430 jobs, a Federal Express regional distribution center, hotel, bank and building materials supplier.

In 2009 Jacoby acquired the Norfolk, Virginia Ford Plant which is envisioned to become a manufacturing and logistics park due to its accessibility from rail, highways and sea. A portion of this was sold to Katoen Natie, a global logistics provider, bringing an estimated 425 jobs to the Norfolk area.

=== Live Oak ===
The Live Oak Landfill, owned by Waste Management in Atlanta, was closed in December 2004, but processed over 1.2 million tons of waste annually during its 19 years in operation. In October 2007 Jacoby Energy Development was selected to develop a $30 million "Landfill-gas-to-pipeline quality" system, one of just two in the state. Production was expected to generate enough gas to supply 30,000 homes. The process involves collecting the landfill exhaust gases, sending the gases via pipeline to the Conley, Georgia landfill gas processing facility where up to 1,500 MWh of biomethane is generated daily before it is injected into Atlanta Gas Light pipelines to be used as a feedstock for renewable hydrogen, renewable compressed or liquefied natural gas or to generate renewable electricity. Jacoby began production in February 2009, then Air Liquide purchased the facility in 2012.

=== Azalea ===
The Azalea Solar Park was the largest of its kind in Georgia and opened for production in November 2013. The Photovoltaic system produces 7.7 megawatts of power using ground-mounted photovoltaic panels. Located in Washington County, Georgia, the 80 acres (32 ha) site near Davisboro was acquired in 2012. Dominion Resources purchased the facility shortly after its completion.

=== Media ===
The Atlanta Media Campus (AMC) project was formed in 2013 as a media production facility in suburban Atlanta. The 5,000,000 sq ft (460,000 m^{2}) complex included the former site of Bell Labs Georgia branch and a fiber-optic cable manufacturing plant that never opened. The Georgia Entertainment Industry Investment Act provided a tax incentive up to 30% for in-state costs on projects exceeding $500K. Movies filmed at AMC included The Hunger Games, Fast & Furious 7 and A Walk in the Woods. Apartments were also planned for the workers and a hotel where the actors could relax during production breaks. Because there was insufficient experienced production talent available locally, most projects were forced to "import" those people from California, which greatly reduced the tax credit. Jacoby planned to form relationships with several film schools to provide opportunities for students to intern on Indie films and gain experience. The Georgia Film Academy partnered with AMC's facilities to provide education and hands-on training. Unfortunately, Jacoby did not own the property, was unable to secure financing, and officially closed in 2019.

=== Cumberland ===
The Gilman Paper Mill opened during 1941 in St. Marys, Georgia in Camden County, Georgia. For more than two decades it employed half of the town's residents and fueled the economy. By the end of the 20th century, ownership had changed twice, finally to Mexico's Durango Products. The plant was closed in 2002 The property was purchased in 2005 at a bankruptcy auction by a Jacksonville developer. He planned a 2,000-home development, only to abandon the project following the 2008 financial crisis. In 2020, Jacoby Development was chosen as project developer because their portfolio contained successful rehabilitation projects: Atlantic Station and Aerotropolis Atlanta. The Cumberland Inlet development project involved clearing and remediating the paper mill site, then building an ecotourism base camp on the waterfront with a hotel and marina, RV park, commercial spaces and home rentals. Brian Kemp, Georgia's Governor was in attendance at the groundbreaking for the Cumberland Inlet development, expressing optimism about the planned $500 million project The Camden County Joint Development Authority (CCJDA) borrowed almost $11 million in seed money to be repaid in regular installments starting in 2023. The Jacoby Development subsidiary made the first two payments, but the third payment of $736,000 was missed. Some of the project work was completed, but in 2025, the CCJDA filed a lawsuit seeking repayment of over $9 million in loans for the stalled Cumberland Inlet redevelopment project. In early 2026 CCJDA announced that they have recovered ownership of the property.

== Personal life ==
Jacoby lives in Atlanta. He and his wife, Jan were married in 1976 and are parents of two adult children. In younger years Jacoby sailed boats; he enjoys SCUBA diving and is an experienced diver who has cataloged dives in Galapagos, Great Barrier Reef, Tahiti and multiple Caribbean sites. He also enjoys fishing, is interested in the marine environment and how underwater species can help in medical research of a multitude of diseases. His daughter had special needs, so he served on the Epilepsy Foundation board.

Jacoby's motor yacht was named in honor of his mother, Phoebe. Miss Phoebe II was the first boat to participate in the "Scientific Vessel of Opportunity Program", created by the International SeaKeepers Society. Yachts are the platform to allow scientists to perform valuable research around the globe. The vessel's first expedition was to Dry Tortugas and the next was to the Bahamas at Tiger Beach.

== Memberships of professional bodies ==
Jacoby has stayed involved with the International Council of Shopping Centers. He also sits on the board of the Georgia Aquarium, Guy Harvey Ocean Foundation, Savannah College of Art and Design, and the Hawaii Health Foundation. He formerly served 10 years as a board member of the University of Floridas Whitney Laboratory for Marine Bioscience.

== Awards ==
- Best in Atlanta Real Estate Awards Deal of the Year (2012).
- International Seakeepers Society Award (2012).
- Wall Street Journal's Television Enterprise (2010).
- Deal of the Year “Land” (2010).
- Deal of the Decade “Best Overall” (2010).
- Lindbergh Corporate Award for Balance (2008).
- Georgia Trends Most Influential Georgians (2006).
- Deal of the Year “Visionary” (2008).
- Deal of the Year “Land” (2008).
- Best Parking Structures (2008).
- Georgia Trends Most Influential Georgians (2006).
- Georgia Conservancy Distinguished Conservationist of the Year (2006).
- Atlanta Leadership Trip (2006).
- American Council of Engineering Companies of Georgia Honor Award (2006).
- State Award Engineers Week 2005 Engineering Excellence (2005).
- Georgia State University Hall of Distinction (2005).
- EPA Phoenix Award Grand Prize (2004).
- Argon Award (2004).
- EPA Southeast Environmental Merit Award (2000).
