= Larry Gould =

Larry Gould may refer to:

- Laurence McKinley Gould (1896–1995), American scientist & educator
- Larry Gould (bridge), American bridge player
- Larry Gould (ice hockey) (born 1952), Canadian ice hockey player
