= Weichsel =

Weichsel may refer to:

- Vistula river (Weichsel in German)
- Weichselian glaciation
- Peter Weichsel (born 1943), American bridge player
