= Percy Sheardown =

Canadian bridge player

Percy Sheardown (1911–1993) was a Canadian bridge player.

== Bridge accomplishments ==
=== Wins ===
- North American Bridge Championships (4)
  - Reisinger (2) 1936, 1951
  - Spingold (2) 1964, 1965

=== Runners-up ===
- North American Bridge Championships (1)
  - von Zedtwitz Life Master Pairs (1) 1964
