= Steve Sion =

American bridge player

Steve Sion (born c. 1954) is a former American bridge player.

== Bridge accomplishments ==
=== Awards ===
- Fishbein Trophy (1) 1984

=== Wins ===
- North American Bridge Championships (8)
  - North American Pairs (1) 1984
  - Grand National Teams (1) 1989
  - Jacoby Open Swiss Teams (1) 1993
  - Lebhar IMP Pairs (1) 1995
  - Mitchell Board-a-Match Teams (1) 1979
  - Chicago Mixed Board-a-Match (2) 1984, 1994
  - Wernher Open Pairs (1) 1990

=== Runners-up ===
- North American Bridge Championships (6)
  - Grand National Teams (1) 1978
  - Reisinger (1) 1974
  - Spingold (1) 1984
  - von Zedtwitz Life Master Pairs (3) 1984, 1991, 1994

== Sion-Cokin Affair ==
Steve Sion and his regular partner Alan Cokin were convicted of cheating in 1979. They were banned, though their American Contract Bridge League (ACBL) memberships were reinstated five years later. Sion was convicted of cheating again in 1997 and was expelled from the ACBL.

The cheating convictions make his bridge accomplishments suspect.
