= Ellenby =

Ellenby is a surname. Notable people with the surname include:

- John Ellenby (1941–2016), British businessman
- Milton Ellenby, American bridge player
