= David Carter (bridge) =

American bridge player

David C. Carter is an American bridge player.

== Bridge accomplishments ==
=== Wins ===
- North American Bridge Championships (5)
  - Mitchell Board-a-Match Teams (1) 1950
  - Spingold (2) 1953, 1954
  - Wernher Open Pairs (1) 1957
  - von Zedtwitz Life Master Pairs (1) 1954

=== Runners-up ===
- North American Bridge Championships (6)
  - Open Pairs (1928-1962) (3) 1946, 1953, 1954
  - Rockwell Mixed Pairs (1) 1946
  - Spingold (1) 1962
  - Wernher Open Pairs (1) 1960

=== Convention ===
Carter is one of the originators of the Texas transfer convention.
