= Barbara Rappaport =

American bridge player

Barbara Rappaport is an American bridge player.

== Bridge accomplishments ==
=== Awards ===
- Fishbein Trophy (1) 1971

=== Wins ===
- North American Bridge Championships (3)
  - Smith Life Master Women's Pairs (1) 1977
  - von Zedtwitz Life Master Pairs (2) 1971, 1972

=== Runners-up ===
- North American Bridge Championships (8)
  - Chicago Mixed Board-a-Match (3) 1966, 1974, 1975
  - Smith Life Master Women's Pairs (2) 1973, 1974
  - Wagar Women's Knockout Teams (2) 1969, 1971
  - Whitehead Women's Pairs (1) 1978
