= Milton Ellenby =

American bridge player

Milton Ellenby is an American bridge player.

Ellenby is a World Champion, having won the Bermuda Bowl in 1954.

== Bridge accomplishments ==
=== Awards ===
- Fishbein Trophy (1) 1953

=== Wins ===
- Bermuda Bowl (1) 1954
- North American Bridge Championships (6)
  - Chicago Mixed Board-a-Match (1) 1957
  - Open Pairs (1928-1962) (1) 1955
  - Spingold (2) 1953, 1954
  - Wernher Open Pairs (1) 1951
  - von Zedtwitz Life Master Pairs (1) 1953

=== Runners-up ===
- Bermuda Bowl (1) 1955
- North American Bridge Championships (2)
  - Spingold (1) 1957
  - Wernher Open Pairs (1) 1954
