= John W. Hubbell =

American bridge player

John W. Hubbell is an American bridge player.

== List of Bridge Accomplishments ==
=== Wins ===
- North American Bridge Championships (4)
  - Spingold (2) 1953, 1954
  - Wernher Open Pairs (1) 1957
  - von Zedtwitz Life Master Pairs (1) 1954

=== Runners-up ===
- North American Bridge Championships (1)
  - Spingold (1) 1962
