= Alvin Roth (bridge) =

American bridge player

Alvin Leon Roth (November 6, 1914 – April 18, 2007) was an American bridge player, considered one of the greatest of all time, and "the premier bidding theorist of his bridge generation". He wrote several books on the game, and invented various bidding conventions that have become commonplace, including five-card majors, negative doubles, forcing notrump, and the unusual notrump. Roth was considered a fascinating theorist but was described by one partner, Richard "Dick" Freeman, as "very tough to sit opposite—unless you were so thick-skinned that no insult was severe enough to hurt, or you were willing to make extreme sacrifices to get on a winning side."

== Biography ==
Roth was born in The Bronx. He graduated from Stuyvesant High School and studied mathematics at City College of New York, where he discovered bridge. Roth then took a job as a government statistician in Washington, D.C. He served in the US Army in World War II, where he met future bridge partner Tobias Stone, then returned to New York City.

He played for the United States or North America in the Bermuda Bowl world team championships of 1955, 1958, and 1967, losing the final each time. He also won a silver medal with the US team in the 1968 World Team Olympiad.

Roth was a Grand Life Master of the American Contract Bridge League, and a World Life Master of the World Bridge Federation.

After attending a bridge tournament in Miami Beach, Roth moved there and ran a bridge club for five years. Then he founded the Charles Goren School of Bridge in Washington and ran it for ten years. Roth then purchased the Mayfair Club in New York, which he managed until retiring to Florida in 1995.

Roth married twice, first to Fay Edelstein in 1940. They had a son, but were divorced in 1963, and she died in 1995. He married his second wife, Jean Farrell, in 1980.

Roth died of natural causes in Boca Raton.

== Bridge accomplishments ==
=== Honors ===
- ACBL Hall of Fame, 1995

=== Awards ===
- Fishbein Trophy 1963, 1965, 1966
- Herman Trophy 1952

=== Wins ===
- North American Bridge Championships (30)
  - Vanderbilt (3) 1943, 1963, 1968
  - Spingold (6) 1940, 1956, 1957, 1963, 1966, 1967
  - Chicago (now Reisinger) (3) 1946, 1952, 1961
  - Reisinger (1) 1967
  - Men's Board-a-Match Teams (4) 1955, 1961, 1969, 1971
  - Master Mixed Teams (4) 1952, 1953, 1955, 1965
  - Life Master Pairs (3) 1956, 1971, 1972
  - Fall National Open Pairs (1) 1942
  - Open Pairs (1) 1960
  - Rockwell Mixed Pairs (2) 1946, 1952
  - Hilliard Mixed Pairs (1) 1959
  - Master Individual (1) 1943

=== Runners-up ===
- Bermuda Bowl (3) 1955, 1958, 1967
- World Open Team Olympiad (1) 1968
- Olympiad Mixed Teams (1) 1972
- North American Bridge Championships (23)
  - Vanderbilt (2) 1953, 1975
  - Spingold (4) 1943, 1945, 1953, 1961
  - Chicago (now Reisinger) (2) 1937, 1954
  - Reisinger (1) 1966
  - Men's Board-a-Match Teams (4) 1952, 1957, 1973, 1977
  - Master Mixed Teams (5) 1945, 1963, 1966, 1973, 1975
  - Life Master Pairs (1) 1965
  - Fall National Open Pairs (1) 1958
  - Open Pairs (2) 1958, 1966
  - Master Individual (1) 1955
- United States Bridge Championships (1)
  - Open Pair Trials (1) 1967

== Publications ==
Books

- — (1953). Al Roth on Bridge: The Roth–Stone System for Duplicate and Tournament Play (1st ed.). Washington D.C.: Melville Publishers. 176 pages.
- with Stone, Tobias (1958). Bridge is a Partnership Game: The Roth-Stone System (1st ed.). E.P. Dutton & Co., Inc. LCCN 58-9305. 237 pages.
- with Rubens, Jeff (1968). Modern Bridge Bidding Complete: Introducing the Roth Point Count (1st ed.). New York: Funk & Wagnalls. LCCN 68-21644. 512 pages.
- with Rubens, Jeff (1970). Bridge for Beginners (1st ed.). New York: Funk & Wagnalls. LCCN 73-93922. 216 pages.
- with Stone, Tobias (1989). Bridge is a Partnership Game: The Roth-Stone System (2nd ed.). Ballston Lake, NY: Granovetter Books. OCLC 22757918. 237 pages. Preface revised by Alvin Roth.
- — (1991). Picture Bidding: the art of painting a bridge hand (1st ed.). Ballston Lake, NY: Granovetter Books. ISBN 0-940257-11-4. 317 pages.

Pamphlets

- Negative Doubles (Louisville: Devyn Press, 1981), Championship Bridge no. 5
- The Unusual No Trump (Devyn, 1981), Championship Bridge no. 11
