= Nick Nickell =

American bridge player

Frank T. "Nick" Nickell (born 1947) is an American bridge player. He graduated from the University of North Carolina, and lived in Raleigh, North Carolina, as of 1994.

Nickell was inducted into the ACBL Hall of Fame in 2008. At the time he lived in New York City and led the private equity investment firm Kelso & Company.

Nickell has created one of the most dominant bridge teams of all time, winning four world championships and multiple North American Bridge Championships. He formed a successful partnership with Richard Freeman until Freeman's death and has since partnered with Ralph Katz. He has won both team events and pair events.

Nickell is an ACBL Grand Life Master.

== Bridge accomplishments ==
=== Honors ===
- ACBL Hall of Fame, 2008

=== Awards ===
- Fishbein Trophy (1) 1995

=== Wins ===
- Bermuda Bowl (4) 1995, 1999, 2003, 2009
- North American Bridge Championships (24)
  - von Zedtwitz Life Master Pairs (2) 2003, 2022
  - Blue Ribbon Pairs (1) 1991
  - Vanderbilt (4) 2000, 2003, 2014, 2017, 2024
  - Reisinger (7) 1993, 1994, 1995, 2004, 2005, 2008, 2009
  - Spingold (9) 1993, 1994, 1995, 1996, 1998, 1999, 2004, 2006, 2007
  - Senior Knockout Teams (1) 2016
- United States Bridge Championships (9)
  - Open Team Trials (9) 1998, 2001, 2002, 2004, 2007, 2008, 2012, 2014, 2017

=== Runners-up ===
- Bermuda Bowl (2) 1997, 2005
- Rosenblum Cup 2010
- North American Bridge Championships (15)
  - Grand National Teams (1) 1983
  - Vanderbilt (4) 1996, 2002, 2018, 2019
  - Mitchell Board-a-Match Teams (3) 1998, 1999, 2012
  - Spingold (2) 2011, 2012
  - Roth Open Swiss Teams (2) 2015, 2018
  - Senior Knockout Teams (2) 2017, 2018
  - Reisinger (1) 2014
- United States Bridge Championships (1)
  - Open Team Trials (1) 1997
