= Spingold =

North American bridge championship

The Spingold national bridge championship is held at the summer American Contract Bridge League (ACBL) North American Bridge Championship (NABC).

The Spingold is a knock-out team event that attracts the top contract bridge players in the world. The event typically lasts seven days with each day being a round consisting of four sessions of 16 boards. The event is open and seeded.

== History ==
The Spingold Master Knockout Teams, first known as the Challenge Knockout Teams, was contested for the Asbury Park Trophy in the early days. The runner-up team in the regularly scheduled portion of the event had the right to challenge the winners to a playoff. This right was never utilized.

In 1934, 1936 and 1937, the Masters Teams-of-Four and the Asbury Park Trophy were separate events, providing two sets of winners. In 1938 the event became the Spingold Master Knockout Teams and a part of the Summer NABC. At one time, the Spingold was a double elimination event, usually lasting nine or 10 sessions. It was scored by International Match Points and was restricted to players with 100 or more masterpoints. In 1965, the double elimination method was replaced by three qualifying sessions (subsequently reduced to two), followed by single elimination knockout matches. The preliminary qualifying sessions were dropped in 1970.

The Spingold Trophy, donated by Nathan B. Spingold in 1934, is one of ACBL's most prized team trophies. The event, which attracts all of the world's best bridge players, is widely considered one of the toughest events in the world. Many bridge aficionados consider the modern day Spingold tougher to win than a World Championship.

== Winners ==
Nick Nickell's professional teams won the Spingold nine times in 15 years from 1993 to 2007, including four in a row without change in personnel (intact) from 1993 to 1996, and two more 1998–99 after one change. The four-time winners were Nickell, Richard Freeman, Bob Hamman, Bobby Wolff, Jeff Meckstroth, and Eric Rodwell. Paul Soloway replaced Wolff and played on the other five Nickell champions, over ten years.

The champion has defended its title intact on four other occasions, 1965, 1971, 2002, and 2012.

The winners in 2011-12 and the winners and runner up in 2014 and 2015 each had two players who were later disqualified for cheating, this casting doubt on the integrity of those performances.

Asbury Park Trophy teams-of-four (1930–1937)
Year	Winners	Runners-up
1930	Ely Culbertson, Josephine Culbertson, Theodore Lightner, Waldemar von Zedtwitz	Michael T. Gottlieb, Willard Karn, Lee Langdon, P. Hal Sims
1931	David Burnstine, Oswald Jacoby, Willard Karn, P. Hal Sims	S. Garton Churchill, Travers LeGros, Dorothy Roberts, Phillip Stockvis
1932	Michael T. Gottlieb, Oswald Jacoby, Theodore Lightner, Louis H. Watson	B. Jay Becker, Herbert Lent, George Reith, Anne Rosenfeld
1933	David Burnstine, Oswald Jacoby, Richard L. Frey, Howard Schenken	Sam Fry, Edward Hymes Jr., Louis H. Watson, Waldemar von Zedtwitz
1934	Aaron Frank, Jeff Glick, William Hopkins, Charles Porter	Josephine Culbertson, Theodore Lightner, Sonny Moyse, Sherman Stearns
1935	Sam Fry, Edward Hymes Jr., Theodore Lightner, Merwyn Maier, Louis H. Watson	Mitch Barnes, Huber Boscowitz, Charles Lochridge, Johnny Rau
1936	Lewis Bernard, Louis Haddad, Alvin Landy, Matthew Reilly, Philip Steiner	Melvin Goddard, Sidney Silodor, Henry Vogel, Derrick Wernher
1937	David Burnstine, Charles Goren, Oswald Jacoby, Merwyn Maier, Howard Schenken	Phil Abramsohn, Mitch Barnes, Henry Chanin, Morrie Elis, Fred Kaplan

Spingold Trophy teams-of-four, 1934 to present
Year	Winners	Runners-up
1934	David Burnstine, Richard L. Frey, Michael T. Gottlieb, Oswald Jacoby, Howard Schenken	Aaron Frank, Jeff Glick, Louis Haddad, Charles Hall
1936	B. Jay Becker, David Burnstine, Oswald Jacoby, Howard Schenken	Sam Fry, Edward Hymes Jr., Merwyn Maier, Waldemar von Zedtwitz
1937	Sam Fry, Edward Hymes Jr., Theodore Lightner, Waldemar von Zedtwitz	Phil Abramsohn, Lewis Bernard, Morrie Elis, Harry Fishbein, Herbert Goldberg
After 1937, the Spingold became a championship of the new ACBL and part of its summer NABC meet.
1938	B. Jay Becker, David Burnstine, Oswald Jacoby, Merwyn Maier, Howard Schenken	Mitch Barnes, Morrie Elis, Fred Kaplan, Charles Lochridge
1939	Oswald Jacoby, Theodore Lightner, Merwyn Maier, Robert McPherran, Howard Schenken	John R. Crawford, Myron Fuchs, Charles Goren, Charles Solomon, Sally Young
1940	Oscar Brotman, Bertram Lebhar Jr., Samuel Katz, Alvin Roth	Sam Fry, Myron Fuchs, Edward Hymes Jr., Charles Lochridge, Waldemar von Zedtwitz
1941	Mitch Barnes, Sam Fry, Edward Hymes Jr., Waldemar von Zedtwitz	B. Jay Becker, Oswald Jacoby, Theodore Lightner, Merwyn Maier, Howard Schenken
1942	Sigmund Dornbusch, Richard L. Frey, Lee Hazen, Sam Stayman	Jay Feigus, Charles Harvey, Samuel Katz, Edward Marcus
1943	John R. Crawford, Charles Goren, Edward Hymes Jr., Howard Schenken, Sidney Silodor	B. Jay Becker, Harry Fishbein, George Rapée, Alvin Roth, Helen Sobel
1944	B. Jay Becker, George Rapée, Helen Sobel, Sam Stayman	Simon Becker, Edward Ellenbogen, Stanley Frenkel, Peggy Golder
1945	Sam Fry, Edward Hymes Jr., Oswald Jacoby, Theodore Lightner, Howard Schenken	Harry Fishbein, Lee Hazen, Alvin Roth, Waldemar von Zedtwitz
1946	William Christian, Mark Hodges, Sol Mogal, Margaret Wagar	Jeff Glick, Arthur Goldsmith, Alvin Landy, Elmer Schwartz
1947	B. Jay Becker, Charles Goren, Lee Hazen, Helen Sobel, Waldemar von Zedtwitz	John R. Crawford, George Rapée, Howard Schenken, Sidney Silodor, Sam Stayman
1948	John R. Crawford, George Rapée, Howard Schenken, Sam Stayman, Margaret Wagar	Julius Bank, Arthur Glatt, Robert Halpin, Oswald Jacoby, Ralph Kempner
1949	Jeff Glick, Arthur Goldsmith, Bruce Gowdy, Alvin Landy, Sol Mogal	Henry Chanin, David Clarren, Oswald Jacoby, Jack Krause, Waldemar von Zedtwitz
1950	John R. Crawford, Oswald Jacoby, George Rapée, Howard Schenken, Sam Stayman	B. Jay Becker, Charles Goren, Sidney Silodor, Helen Sobel, Waldemar von Zedtwitz
1951	Myron Field, Charles Goren, Sidney Silodor, Helen Sobel	Ambrose Casner, Charles Hall, Allen Harvey, Frank Weisbach
1952	B. Jay Becker, John R. Crawford, George Rapée, Howard Schenken, Sam Stayman	Jeff Glick, Arthur Goldsmith, Alvin Landy, Sol Mogal, Edwin Smith
1953	Clifford Bishop, Milton Ellenby, Don Oakie, William Rosen, Doug Steen	2/5. Ed Burns, David Clarren, Bertram Lebhar Jr., Sam Katz, Albert Weiss; 2/5. F. Ayres Bombeck, David Carter, John W. Hubbell, Arthur Kincaid, Bobby Nail; 2/5. Harold Harkavy, Edith Kemp, Alvin Roth, Tobias Stone, Waldemar von Zedtwitz; 2/5. Ivan Erdos, Edward Frischauer, Lew Mathe, Meyer Schleifer
1954	Clifford Bishop, Milton Ellenby, Lew Mathe, John Moran, William Rosen	2/4. F. Ayres Bombeck, David Carter, John Gerber, John W. Hubbell, Harold Rockaway; 2/4. Eddie Burns, Ambrose Casner, Allen Harvey, Cliff Russell; 2/4. Sidney Lazard, Cyrus Newman, Lewis Rosen, Julius Rosenblum, Robert Rothlein
1955	Myron Field, Lee Hazen, Richard Kahn, Charles Solomon, Sam Stayman	B. Jay Becker, John R. Crawford, George Rapée, Howard Schenken, Sidney Silodor
1956	1/3. Charles Goren, Peter Leventritt, Boris Koytchou, Harold Ogust, William Seamon, Helen Sobel; 1/3. Harold Harkavy, Victor Mitchell, Alvin Roth, Ira Rubin, Tobias Stone; 1/3. Robert Abeles, Kalman Apfel, Francis Begley, Louis Kelner, Ronald Rosenberg	
1957	B. Jay Becker, John R. Crawford, George Rapée, Alvin Roth, Sidney Silodor, Tobias Stone	Milton Ellenby, Ivan Erdos, Emmanuel Hochfeld, Jim Jacoby, Oswald Jacoby, Ira Rubin
1958	Paul Allinger, William Hanna, Sidney Lazard, Cyrus Neuman, Robert Rothlein	Harry Fishbein, Sam Fry, Leonard Harmon, Lee Hazen, Ivar Stakold
1959	William Grieve, Oswald Jacoby, Victor Mitchell, Ira Rubin, Morton Rubinow, Sam Stayman	Richard Freeman, Andy Gabrilovitch, Frank Hoadley, Mike Michaels, Jan Stone, Richard Walsh
1960	Charles Goren, Peter Leventritt, Boris Koytchou, Harold Ogust, Howard Schenken, Helen Sobel	B. Jay Becker, William Grieve, Ralph Hirschberg, Norman Kay, George Rapée, Sidney Silodor
1961	Andy Gabrilovitch, Eddie Kantar, Marshall Miles, Bill Root	John R. Crawford, Norman Kay, Alvin Roth, George Rapée, Sidney Silodor, Tobias Stone
1962	Leonard Harmon, Eddie Kantar, Marshall Miles, Ivar Stakgold	David Carter, John W. Hubbell, Jim Jacoby, Gerald Michaud, Bobby Nail
1963	Russ Arnold, Harold Harkavy, Edith Kemp, Alvin Roth, Cliff Russell, William Seamon	Sami Kehela, Richard Kahn, Bill Root, Tommy Sanders, Tobias Stone, Waldemar von Zedtwitz
1964	Bruce Elliott, Sami Kehela, Eric Murray, Percy Sheardown	Marvin Altman, Bruce Gowdy, Fred Hoffer, Ray Jotcham
1965	Bruce Elliott, Sami Kehela, Eric Murray, Percy Sheardown	B. Jay Becker, Dorothy Hayden, Norman Kay, Edgar Kaplan
1966	Bill Root, Alvin Roth, Ira Rubin, Curtis Smith	William Grieve, Sidney Lazard, Paul Levitt, Harold Ogust, George Rapée
1967	Edgar Kaplan, Norman Kay, Bill Root, Alvin Roth	John Gerber, Paul Hodge, Dan Morse, George Rosenkranz, Bobby Wolff
1968	Sami Kehela, Edgar Kaplan, Norman Kay, Sidney Lazard, Eric Murray, George Rapée	Steve Altman, B. Jay Becker, Mike Becker, Dorothy Hayden
1969	Billy Eisenberg, Bobby Goldman, Bob Hamman, Mike Lawrence, Jim Jacoby, Bobby Wolff	Phil Feldesman, William Grieve, Victor Mitchell, Ira Rubin, Sam Stayman, Jeff Westheimer
1970	Steve Altman, Tom Smith, Dave Strasberg, Joel Stuart, Peter Weichsel	Billy Eisenberg, Bobby Goldman, Bob Hamman, Jim Jacoby, Mike Lawrence, Bobby Wolff
1971	Steve Altman, Eugene Neiger, Tom Smith, Joel Stuart, Peter Weichsel	Edgar Kaplan, Norman Kay, Don Krauss, Lew Mathe
1972	B. Jay Becker, Mike Becker, Andy Bernstein, Jeff Rubens	Pat Brennan, Byron Greenberg, Edith Kemp, Cliff Russell, Curtis Smith, Albert Weiss
1973	Larry T. Cohen, Billy Eisenberg, Eddie Kantar, Richard H. Katz, Bud Reinhold	Minda Brachman, Sidney Lazard, Jim Jacoby, Paul Soloway, John Swanson
1974	Lou Bluhm, Larry Gould, Steve Goldberg, Richard Shepherd	Harlow Lewis, Lew Mathe, Peter Pender, Bill Root, Harry Stappenbeck, Arthur Waldman
1975	Grant Baze, John Fejervary, Lew Stansby, Piyush Vakil, Ron Von der Porten	Ira Cohen, Harold Guiver, Marty Shallon, Bill Sides
1976	Roger Bates, Larry T. Cohen, Richard H. Katz, John Mohan, George Rosenkranz	David Berkowitz, Mark Blumenthal, Jim Jacoby, Mike Lawrence, George Rapée, John Solodar
1977	Lou Bluhm, Dan Morse, Cliff Russell, Curtis Smith, Tommy Sanders, Eddie Wold	Ken Cohen, Larry Gould, Larry Kozlove, John Sheridan
1978	Malcolm Brachman, Bobby Goldman, Eddie Kantar, Mike Passell, Paul Soloway	Steve Altman, Edgar Kaplan, Norman Kay, Richard Pavlicek, Bill Root, Tom Smith
1979	Fred Hamilton, Bob Hamman, Ira Rubin, Bobby Wolff	Ed Manfield, Steve Robinson, Eric Rodwell, John Sheridan, Kit Woolsey
1980	Mike Becker, Kyle Larsen, Ron Rubin, Alan Sontag, Ron Von der Porten, Peter Weichsel	Rich Freisner, Brian Glubok, Mike Lawrence, George Rapée, Michael Rosenberg, John Solodar
1981	Larry N. Cohen, Ron Gerard, Ralph Katz, Warren Rosner, Allan Stauber, John Sutherlin	Bart Bramley, Rich Freisner, Ed Manfield, Kit Woolsey
1982	Ron Rubin, Mike Becker, Bob Hamman, Bobby Wolff, Alan Sontag, Peter Weichsel	Mark Molson, Billy Cohen, Eric Kokish, Peter Nagy
1983	Malcolm Brachman, Bobby Wolff, Bobby Goldman, Bob Hamman, Paul Soloway, Ron Andersen	Luella Slaner, Marty Bergen, Larry N. Cohen, Brian Glubok, Mark Cohen, Jerry Goldfein
1984	George Rosenkranz, Eddie Wold, Marty Bergen, Larry N. Cohen, Jeff Meckstroth, Eric Rodwell	Alan Sontag, Allan Cokin, Jim Sternberg, Bernie Chazen, Steve Sion
1985	Tom Mahaffey, Jack Denny, Bill Passell, Russ Arnold, Ira Rubin, Chuck Burger	Ron Rubin, Jeff Meckstroth, Eric Rodwell, Mike Lawrence, Peter Weichsel
1986	Malcolm Brachman, Bobby Goldman, Ron Andersen, Mike Passell, Mark Lair, Paul Soloway	Brian Glubok, Billy Cohen, John Schermer, Neil Chambers
1987	Brian Glubok, Dan Rotman, Harry Stappenbeck, Jaggy Shivdasani	Tom Mahaffey, Jack Denny, Russ Arnold, Bernie Chazen, Roy Fox, Michael Seamon
1988	Jim Mahaffey, Ron Andersen, Paul Soloway, Bobby Goldman, Eric Rodwell, Jeff Meckstroth	Ron Rubin, Mike Becker, Peter Weichsel, Bart Bramley, Bobby Levin, Lou Bluhm
1989	Jimmy Cayne, Chuck Burger, Bob Hamman, Bobby Wolff, Mike Passell, Mark Lair	Jon Wittes, Ross Grabel, Mark Cohen, Mark Feldman
1990	Jimmy Cayne, Chuck Burger, Chip Martel, Lew Stansby, Bob Hamman, Bobby Wolff	Jim Mahaffey, Paul Soloway, Bobby Goldman, Ron Andersen, Jeff Meckstroth, Eric Rodwell
1991	Zia Mahmood, Michael Rosenberg, Seymon Deutsch, Jeff Meckstroth, Eric Rodwell	Cliff Russell, Peter Weichsel, Bobby Levin, Sam Lev, Alan Sontag, Eddie Kantar
1992	Mike Becker, Ron Rubin, Russ Ekeblad, Ron Sukoneck, Bobby Levin, Peter Weichsel	Steve Robinson, Peter Boyd, Lew Stansby, Kit Woolsey, Neil Silverman, Chip Martel
1993	Nick Nickell, Richard Freeman, Bob Hamman, Bobby Wolff, Jeff Meckstroth, Eric Rodwell	Zia Mahmood, Michael Rosenberg, Seymon Deutsch, Hemant Lall, Chip Martel, Lew Stansby
1994	Nick Nickell, Richard Freeman, Bob Hamman, Bobby Wolff, Jeff Meckstroth, Eric Rodwell	Jimmy Cayne, Chuck Burger, Mark Lair, Mike Passell, Paul Soloway, Bobby Goldman
1995	Nick Nickell, Richard Freeman, Bob Hamman, Bobby Wolff, Jeff Meckstroth, Eric Rodwell	Zia Mahmood, Michael Rosenberg, Chip Martel, Lew Stansby
1996	Nick Nickell, Richard Freeman, Bob Hamman, Bobby Wolff, Jeff Meckstroth, Eric Rodwell	Richard Schwartz, Paul Soloway, Bobby Goldman, Steve Robinson, Alan Sontag, Ron Smith
1997	Grant Baze, Tipton Golias, Marek Szymanowski, Marcin Leśniewski, Cezary Balicki, Adam Żmudziński	Jimmy Cayne, Chuck Burger, Mike Passell, Michael Seamon, Mark Feldman, Alan Sontag
1998	Nick Nickell, Richard Freeman, Bob Hamman, Paul Soloway, Jeff Meckstroth, Eric Rodwell	Grant Baze, Michael Whitman, Marek Szymanowski, Marcin Leśniewski, Cezary Balicki, Adam Żmudziński
1999	Nick Nickell, Richard Freeman, Bob Hamman, Paul Soloway, Jeff Meckstroth, Eric Rodwell	John Onstott, Steve Beatty, Billy Eisenberg, Garey Hayden
2000	Rose Meltzer, Peter Weichsel, Alan Sontag, Chip Martel, Lew Stansby, Kyle Larsen	Roy Welland, Brad Moss, Marc Jacobus, Fred Gitelman, Magnus Lindkvist, Peter Fredin
2001	George Jacobs, Ralph Katz, Norberto Bocchi, Giorgio Duboin, Lorenzo Lauria, Alfredo Versace	Mike Moss, Fred Chang, Kerry Smith, Jeff Schuett
2002	George Jacobs, Ralph Katz, Norberto Bocchi, Giorgio Duboin, Lorenzo Lauria, Alfredo Versace	Mike Moss, Martin Schifko, Allan Graves, Bryan Maksymetz
2003	Roy Welland, Björn Fallenius, Zia Mahmood, Michael Rosenberg, Cezary Balicki, Adam Żmudziński	Rose Meltzer, Peter Weichsel, Kyle Larsen, Alan Sontag, Chip Martel, Lew Stansby
2004	Nick Nickell, Richard Freeman, Bob Hamman, Paul Soloway, Jeff Meckstroth, Eric Rodwell	Mark Feldman, Billy Cohen, Ron Smith, Gavin Wolpert, Warren Spector, Vincent Demuy
2005	Russ Ekeblad, Ron Rubin, Eric Greco, Geoff Hampson, Fred Gitelman, Brad Moss	Tom Carmichael, Michael White, Joel Wooldridge, John Hurd, Bryan Maksymetz, Dan Gerstman
2006	Nick Nickell, Richard Freeman, Bob Hamman, Paul Soloway, Jeff Meckstroth, Eric Rodwell	James Cayne, Michael Seamon, Fulvio Fantoni, Claudio Nunes, Lorenzo Lauria, Alfredo Versace
2007	Nick Nickell, Hemant Lall, Bob Hamman, Paul Soloway, Jeff Meckstroth, Eric Rodwell	Alexander Dubinin, Andrei Gromov, Cezary Balicki, Adam Żmudziński
2008	Alexander Dubinin, Andrei Gromov, Cezary Balicki, Adam Żmudziński	Roy Welland, Brian Glubok, Steve Garner, Howard Weinstein, Billy Cohen, Ron Smith
2009	Jan Jansma, Louk Verhees, Ricco Van Prooijen, Russell Ekeblad, Matt Granovetter, Ron Rubin	Rose Meltzer, Kyle Larsen, Alan Sontag, David Berkowitz, Larry N. Cohen, Tor Helness
2010	Eric Greco, John Diamond, Geoff Hampson, Brian Platnick, Brad Moss, Fred Gitelman	Rose Meltzer, Kyle Larsen, Alan Sontag, David Berkowitz, Fulvio Fantoni, Claudio Nunes
2011	Pierre Zimmermann, Franck Multon, Fulvio Fantoni, Claudio Nunes, Tor Helness, Geir Helgemo	Nick Nickell, Ralph Katz, Bob Hamman, Zia Mahmood, Jeff Meckstroth, Eric Rodwell
2012	Pierre Zimmermann, Franck Multon, Fulvio Fantoni, Claudio Nunes, Tor Helness, Geir Helgemo	Nick Nickell, Ralph Katz, Jeff Meckstroth, Eric Rodwell, Bobby Levin, Steve Weinstein
2013	Wojciech Gawel, Rafal Jagniewski, Jacek Kalita, Michal Nowosadzki	Leslie Amoils, Peter Bertheau, Thomas Bessis, Joe Grue, Jacob Morgan, Brad Moss
2014	Richard Schwartz, Allan Graves, Lotan Fisher, Ron Schwartz, Boye Brogeland, Espen Lindqvist	Pierre Zimmermann, Franck Multon, Fulvio Fantoni, Claudio Nunes, Tor Helness, Geir Helgemo
2015	Vacated. The original winners were James Cayne, Michael Seamon, Lotan Fisher, Ron Schwartz, Lorenzo Lauria, Alfredo Versace. The title was forfeited.	Vacated. The original second place team was Pierre Zimmermann, Franck Multon, Fulvio Fantoni, Claudio Nunes, Tor Helness, Geir Helgemo. The place was forfeited.
2016	Martin Fleisher, Chip Martel, Sabine Auken, Roy Welland, Brad Moss, Joe Grue	Pierre Zimmermann, Franck Multon, Tor Helness, Geir Helgemo, Krzysztof Martens
2017	John Diamond, Boye Brogeland, Espen Lindqvist, Brian Platnick	Dennis Bilde, Norberto Bocchi, Giorgio Duboin, Antonio Sementa, Agustin Madala, Alejandro Bianchedi
2018	Pierre Zimmermann, Piotr Gawrys, Michal Klukowski, Franck Multon, Geir Helgemo, Tor Helness	Andrew Rosenthal, Aaron Silverstein, David Berkowitz, Migry Zur Campanile, Eldad Ginossar, Chris Willenken
2019	Josef Blass (npc), Sjoert Brink, Bas Drijver, Jacek Kalita, Michal Nowosadzki, Jacek Pszczoła	Pierre Zimmermann, Piotr Gawrys, Tor Helness, Michal Klukowski, Krzysztof Martens, Franck Multon
2020	Cancelled due to the COVID-19 pandemic	
2021	Cancelled due to the COVID-19 pandemic	
2022	Pierre Zimmerman, Michal Klukowski, Piotr Gawrys, Sebastiaan Drijver, Sjoert Brink, Fernando Piedra	Paul Street, Nicolas L'Ecuyer, Ron Pachtmann, Piotr Pawel Zatorski, Andrea Manno, Massimiliano Di Franco
2023	Marty Fleisher, Chip Martel, Cedric Lorenzini, Antonio Sementa, Alfredo Versace, Thomas Bessis	Leif Bremark, Johan Upmark, Simon Hult, Antonio Palma, Fredrik Nystrom, Frederic Wrang
2024	Piotr Pawel Zatorski, Massimiliano Di Franco, Ron Pachtmann, Andrea Manno, Nicolas L'Ecuyer, Paul Street	Patryk Patreuha, Giorgio Duboin, Leonardo Cima, Nikolaos Delimpaltadakis, Vasileios Vroustis, Kiki Ward-Platt
2025	Yinghao Liu, Yichao Chen, Brian Platnick, Kevin Rosenberg, Steve Garner, Jeffrey Wolfson	Zachary Grossack, Stewart Rubenstein, Geir Helgemo, Michael Rosenberg, Joe Grue, Brad Moss

== See also ==
- Reisinger Board-a-Match Teams
- Vanderbilt Knockout Teams
