= Helen Portugal =

American bridge player

Helen Portugal is an American bridge player.

== Bridge accomplishments ==
=== Wins ===
- North American Bridge Championships (6)
  - Chicago Mixed Board-a-Match (1) 1962
  - Hilliard Mixed Pairs (2) 1951, 1953
  - Smith Life Master Women's Pairs (1) 1961
  - Wagar Women's Knockout Teams (1) 1969
  - von Zedtwitz Life Master Pairs (1) 1960

=== Runners-up ===
- World Olympiad Women's Teams Championship (1) 1964
- North American Bridge Championships (5)
  - Vanderbilt (1) 1964
  - Wagar Women's Knockout Teams (3) 1959, 1963, 1964
  - Women's Pairs (1958-62) (1) 1961
