= B. Jay Becker =

American lawyer and bridge player (1904–1987)

B. Jay Becker (May 5, 1904 – October 9, 1987) was an American lawyer and bridge champion from Flushing, Queens.

== Biography ==
He was born and raised in Philadelphia, where he trained as a lawyer at Temple Law School, graduating in 1929; he lived there until 1937. Turning to a career in contract bridge, he became a top player, columnist and teacher, twice winning world championships in the Bermuda Bowl events of 1951 and 1953. After playing on the Vanderbilt Trophy-winning team at age 76 in 1981, he was both the oldest player to win the Vanderbilt teams tournament and the winner of the greatest number of "national" (North American) team championships. Alan Truscott described him as "Among the handful of American experts who are legitimate candidates for the title of 'best player of all time.'"

A conservative bidder, Becker had a careful style, avoided most bidding conventions and relied instead on his technical skills and judgment; he was admired and respected for his quiet demeanor at the table.

Over the years, Becker managed three New York bridge clubs (the Cavendish 1942–47, the New York Bridge Whist 1948–50 and the Regency 1951–56) and for thirty years was a nationally syndicated columnist. A contributor to The Bridge World and the ACBL Bulletin, he was a member of the Editorial Advisory Board of The Official Encyclopedia of Bridge and a member of the ACBL Laws Commission.

Becker was inducted into the ACBL Hall of Fame in 1995.

Both of Becker's sons, Mike and Steve, are also prominent in the bridge world. They divided his legacy—Mike is also an ACBL Hall of Fame player; Steve took over the syndicated column.

== Books ==
- Check Pinochle: official rules and conventions, Morton Wild and Becker (New York Bridge Whist Club, 1950), pamphlet(?), OCLC 8457430, LCCN 50-12782
- Becker on Bridge (Grosset & Dunlap, 1971), 127 pp., LCCN 73-145738

== Bridge accomplishments ==
=== Honors ===
- ACBL Hall of Fame, 1995

=== Awards ===
- Fishbein Trophy (1) 1972

=== Wins ===
- Bermuda Bowl (2) 1951, 1953
- North American Bridge Championships (31)
  - Masters Individual (2) 1937, 1948
  - von Zedtwitz Life Master Pairs (2) 1935, 1964
  - Wernher Open Pairs (1) 1938
  - Blue Ribbon Pairs (1) 1963
  - Open Pairs (1928-1962) (2) 1946, 1962
  - Vanderbilt (8) 1944, 1945, 1951, 1955, 1956, 1957, 1959, 1981
  - Masters Team of 4 (1) 1936
  - Reisinger (8) 1932, 1939, 1942, 1943, 1950, 1953, 1954, 1956
  - Spingold (6) 1938, 1944, 1947, 1952, 1957, 1972

=== Runners-up ===
- Bermuda Bowl (2) 1958, 1965
- North American Bridge Championships
  - Masters Individual (4) 1934, 1941, 1949, 1955
  - Hilliard Mixed Pairs (1) 1932
  - Open Pairs (1928-1962) (1) 1949
  - Vanderbilt (7) 1937, 1938, 1941, 1949, 1950, 1952, 1964
  - Spingold (1) 1932
  - Mitchell Board-a-Match Teams (2) 1959, 1963
  - Chicago Mixed Board-a-Match (5) 1936, 1958, 1960, 1967, 1972
  - Reisinger (3) 1933, 1944, 1951
  - Spingold (7) 1941, 1943, 1950, 1955, 1960, 1965, 1968
