= Marshall Miles =

American bridge expert

- Born: Marshall Lauren Miles; December 16, 1926; Loma Linda, California, US
- Died: February 5, 2013 (aged 86); Redlands, California
- Known for: Contract bridge

Marshall Lauren Miles (December 16, 1926 – February 5, 2013) was an American bridge player, teacher and writer.

== Bridge career ==
Miles learned to play bridge largely from columns in the back issues of daily newspapers at a local public library.

Miles' crowning achievement was winning the World Senior Teams Olympiad in Istanbul in 2004. He won various other tournaments and titles throughout his bridge career, including the Fishbein Trophy and the Life Master Pairs in 1961, as well as the Spingold in that same year and the next. He won the Reisinger in 1962 and 1965 and placed second in the Men's Pairs twice as well as in the Vanderbilt and Fall National Open Pairs. Miles was an American Contract Bridge League (ACBL) Grand Life Master with more than 17,500 masterpoints and was elected into its Hall of Fame in 2005.

Miles wrote "many articles for The Bridge World, American Bridge Digest, Bridge Today, ACBL Bridge Bulletin and was a contributing editor to The Official Encyclopedia of Bridge." He wrote several books including the classic All 52 Cards. (1963)

== Personal ==
Born in Loma Linda, California, Miles graduated from Claremont College and the University of California, Los Angeles. Miles earned a law degree in 1954 and practiced in Southern California from 1955 until his retirement in 1997. Miles was a teacher on The Bridge Forum, an online bridge site on which students from all over the world can learn from experts.

A resident of Redlands, California, Miles died of complications from a heart attack at Redlands Community Hospital, according to his family, on February 5, 2013, at the age of 86.

== Bridge accomplishments ==
=== Honors ===
- ACBL Hall of Fame, Blackwood Award 2005

=== Awards ===
- Fishbein Trophy 1961
- Herman Trophy 1962

=== Wins ===
- Senior International Cup (1) 2004
- North American Bridge Championships (5)
  - Spingold (2) 1961, 1962
  - Reisinger (2) 1962, 1965
  - Life Master Pairs (1) 1961

=== Runners-up ===
- North American Bridge Championships (5)
  - Vanderbilt (1) 1961
  - Senior Swiss Teams (1) 2003
  - Fall National Open Pairs (1) 1962
  - Men's Pairs (2) 1962, 1972
- United States Bridge Championships (1)
  - Senior Team Trials (1) 2004

== Publications ==
- — (1957). How to Win at Duplicate Bridge (1st ed.). Collier Books. — (1959). How to Win at Duplicate Bridge (3rd ed.). New York: Exposition Press.
- — (1963). All 52 Cards: how to reconstruct the concealed hands at the bridge table. Exposition Press. UK Edition: — (1964). Card reading at Contract: how to reconstruct the concealed hands at the bridge table. London: Nicholas Kaye. OCLC 30242705.
- — (1967). Marshall Miles Teaches Logical Bridge: a novel approach to championship principles of bidding and playing your hand (1st ed.). New York: Exposition Press. LCCN 67-24265.
- — (1987). Bridge from the Top - Vol. I. Roswell, GA: Pando Publications. — (1989). Bridge from the Top - Vol. II. Roswell, GA: Pando Publications.
- — (1992). Stronger Competitive Bidding. Oakland, CA: Lawrence & Leong Publishing. ISBN 1-877908-03-7. LCCN 92-070047.
- Reisinger Challenge (Los Alamitos, CA: C&T Bridge Supplies, 1997) OCLC 63171913
- — (2000). Competitive Bidding in the 21st Century. Toronto: Master Point Press. ISBN 1-894154-13-4.
- Inferences at Bridge (Master Point, 2002)
- Modern Constructive Bidding (Master Point, 2005)
- My System: The Unbalanced Diamond (Master Point, 2007)
- It's Your Call (Master Point, 2009)
- More Accurate Bidding (2011)
