= Chris Compton =

American bridge player

Chris Compton is an American bridge player.

He is married to Donna Compton.

== Bridge accomplishments ==
=== Awards ===
- Fishbein Trophy (1) 2016

=== Wins ===
- North American Bridge Championships (4)
  - Jacoby Open Swiss Teams (1) 2008
  - Reisinger (1) 1989
  - Von Zedtwitz Life Master Pairs (1) 2016
  - Roth Open Swiss Teams (1) 2016

=== Runners-up ===
- North American Bridge Championships (8)
  - Keohane North American Swiss Teams (1) 1998
  - Mitchell Board-a-Match Teams (1) 1994
  - Roth Open Swiss Teams (2) 2014, 2017
  - Vanderbilt (2) 1986, 2005
  - Wernher Open Pairs (1) 1987
  - Edgar Kaplan Blue Ribbon Pairs (1) 2018
