= Morrie Elis =

American bridge player

Morris Elis (August 28, 1907 – May 31, 1992, in Lauderhill, Florida) was an American bridge player. Elis was from Lauderhill, and was a graduate of New York University.

== Bridge accomplishments ==
=== Wins ===
- North American Bridge Championships (6)
  - Masters Individual (2) 1940, 1950
  - von Zedtwitz Life Master Pairs (2) 1938, 1940
  - Vanderbilt (1) 1949
  - Chicago Mixed Board-a-Match (1) 1937

=== Runners-up ===
- North American Bridge Championships
  - Masters Individual (1) 1946
  - Wernher Open Pairs (6) 1934, 1937, 1938, 1939, 1940, 1947
  - Open Pairs (1928-1962) (1) 1939
  - Vanderbilt (2) 1943, 1954
  - Spingold (1) 1937
  - Masters Team of 4 (1) 1937
  - Chicago Mixed Board-a-Match (1) 1945
  - Spingold (1) 1938
