= Sami Kehela =

Canadian contract bridge player

Sami R. Kehela (born 1934), sometimes spelled Sammy Kehela, is a Canadian contract bridge player. A member of the Halls of Fame of both the American Contract Bridge League (ACBL) and the Canadian Bridge Federation, he and his long-time partner, the late Eric Murray, are considered two of the best Canadian players in the history of the game.

Between 1966 and 1974, Kehela and Murray placed second in three Bermuda Bowls as one of three pairs comprising the North America teams. Unique among world players, they represented their country as a partnership in all of the first six quadrennial World Team Olympiads, from Turin in 1960 to Valkenburg in 1980. Together they won the Life Master Men's Pairs, the Life Master Pairs, the Vanderbilt, and the Spingold Trophy three times. Kehela and Murray were also runners-up in the 1969 Blue Ribbon Pairs. It was said that the key to their successful partnership was that each thought the other the better player.

Kehela lives with his wife in Toronto (2007). He is a "semi-retired bridge writer and teacher" (perhaps 2001), as former editor of The Ontario Kibitzer and columnist for the monthly Toronto Life.

Kehela and Murray were both inducted into the ACBL Hall of Fame in 2001.

== Bridge accomplishments ==
=== Honours ===
- ACBL Hall of Fame, 2001
- Canadian Bridge Federation Hall of Fame, 2010

=== Wins ===
- North American Bridge Championships (9)
  - von Zedtwitz Life Master Pairs (1) 1969
  - Wernher Open Pairs (1) 1963
  - Blue Ribbon Pairs (1) 1967
  - Nail Life Master Open Pairs (1) 1963
  - Vanderbilt (2) 1966, 1970
  - Spingold (3) 1964, 1965, 1968

=== Runners-up ===
- North American Bridge Championships
  - Blue Ribbon Pairs (1) 1969
  - Reisinger (2) 1969, 1972
  - Spingold (1) 1963
