= Peter Bertheau =

Swedish bridge player

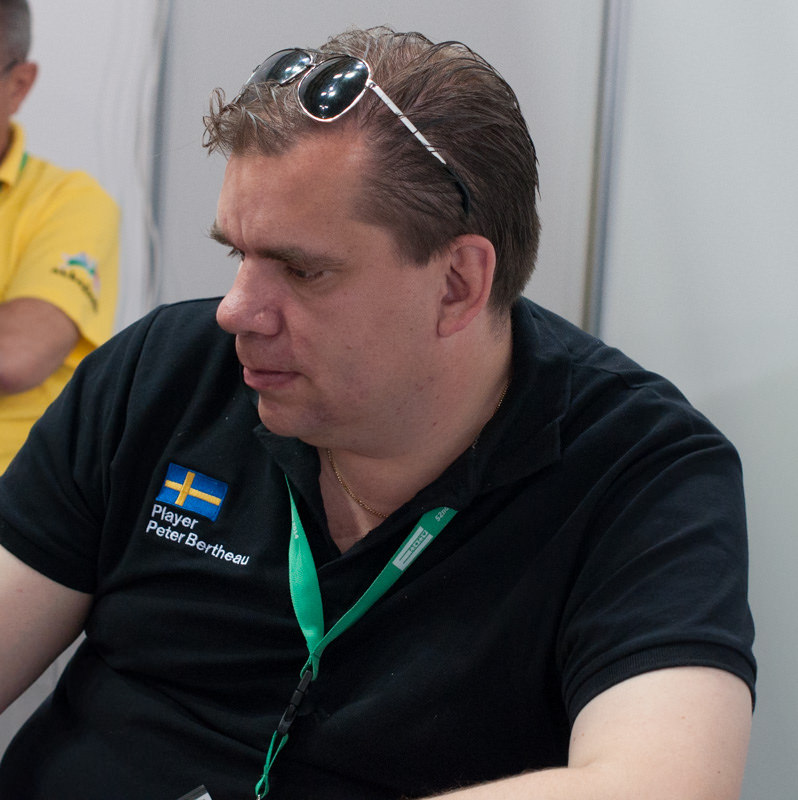
Peter Bertheau (2014)

Peter Bertheau is a Swedish bridge player.

== Bridge accomplishments ==
=== Wins ===
- World Olympiad Teams Championship (1) 2012
- North American Bridge Championships (4)
  - Jacoby Open Swiss Teams (1) 2003
  - Mitchell Board-a-Match Teams (1) 2004
  - Roth Open Swiss Teams (1) 2005
  - von Zedtwitz Life Master Pairs (1) 2011

=== Runners-up ===
- Rosenblum Cup (1) 2006
- North American Bridge Championships (2)
  - Jacoby Open Swiss Teams (1) 2004
  - Spingold (1) 2013
