= Tom Mahaffey =

American bridge player

Tom Mahaffey is an American bridge player.

== Bridge accomplishments ==
=== Wins ===
- North American Bridge Championships (1)
  - Spingold (1) 1985

=== Runners-up ===
- North American Bridge Championships (2)
  - Jacoby Open Swiss Teams (1) 1984
  - Spingold (1) 1987
