= Hank Huckaby =

American politician (1941–2021)

Chancellor of the University System of Georgia
- In office July 1, 2011 – January 1, 2017

Personal details
- Born: December 13, 1941 Griffin, Georgia, U.S.
- Died: April 14, 2021 (aged 79)
- Party: Republican

Henry M. Huckaby (December 13, 1941 – April 14, 2021) was an American politician who served as a member of the Georgia House of Representatives for the 113th district in Watkinsville, encompassing parts of Clarke County, Morgan County, Oconee County, and Oglethorpe County.

He later served as Chancellor of the University System of Georgia from 2011 to 2017.

== Biography ==
Huckaby was born in Spalding County, Georgia and grew up in Hapeville, Fulton County, Georgia. He received an A.A. in political science from Young Harris College and B.A. and M.B.A. from Georgia State University. He later studied Public Administration at the University of Georgia.

In the 1960s and 1970s, he taught at Georgia Perimeter College and Emory University. He then worked as an administrator at Gordon College, Georgia State University, and the University of Georgia. He worked as senior vice president for finance and administration at UGA until 2006. He was sworn in as a Georgia Representative in January 2011 but did not serve a full term, because he took office as chancellor of the university system on July 1, 2011.

He was a member of the Oconee County Rotary Club and the Oconee County Chamber of Commerce. He was also the chairman of the Board of the Ty Cobb Educational Foundation.

Huckaby was a member of the Athens First United Methodist Church, and a trustee of the Georgia United Methodist Foundation. He was married with two children and six grandchildren.

On April 14, 2021, Huckaby died at the age of 79 after suffering from a stroke a week prior.
