= Fred Kaplan (bridge) =

American bridge player

Fred D. Kaplan is an American bridge player.

== Bridge accomplishments ==
=== Wins ===
- North American Bridge Championships (4)
  - Hilliard Mixed Pairs (1) 1938
  - Vanderbilt (2) 1936, 1943
  - Wernher Open Pairs (1) 1936

=== Runners-up ===
- North American Bridge Championships (3)
  - Spingold (1) 1937
  - Spingold (1) 1938
  - Wernher Open Pairs (1) 1943
