= Espen Lindqvist =

Norwegian bridge player

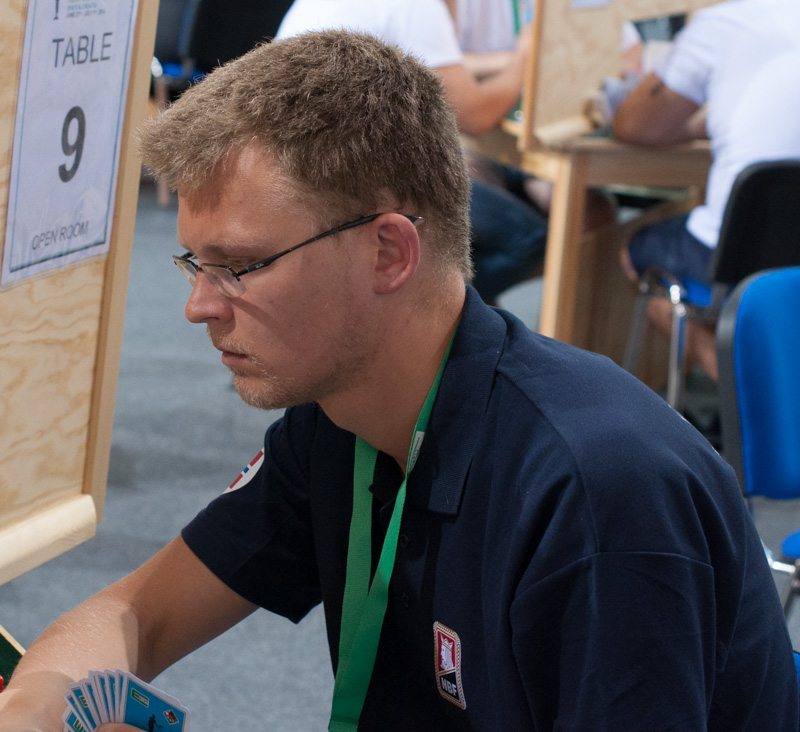
Espen Lindqvist (2014)

Espen Lindqvist is a Norwegian bridge player.

== Bridge accomplishments ==
=== Awards ===
- Fishbein Trophy (2) 2014, 2017

=== Wins ===
- Buffett Cup (1) 2008
- North American Bridge Championships (7)
  - Jacoby Open Swiss Teams (3) 2013, 2015, 2016
  - Spingold (2) 2014, 2017
  - Reisinger Board-A-Match Teams (1) 2014
  - Mitchell Open Board-A-Match Teams (1) 2015

=== Runners-up ===
- North American Bridge Championships (4)
  - Jacoby Open Swiss Teams (1) 2009
  - Von Zedtwitz Life Master Pairs (1) 2017
  - Vanderbilt (1) 2017
  - Mitchell Board-a-Match Teams (1) 2016
