= William Grieve (bridge) =

American bridge player

William Pearson Grieve (1929 – December 20, 2017) was an American bridge player from White Plains, New York. He was educated at Boston University and NYU, and was a computer programmer for IBM. Grieve won the Reisinger in 3 consecutive years, 1969, 1970, 1971. Grieve was an avid tennis player.

== Bridge accomplishments ==
=== Wins ===
- North American Bridge Championships (7)
  - Wernher Open Pairs (1) 1958
  - Mitchell Board-a-Match Teams (1) 1975
  - Chicago Mixed Board-a-Match (1) 1960
  - Reisinger (3) 1969, 1970, 1971
  - Spingold (1) 1959

=== Runners-up ===
- North American Bridge Championships (6)
  - Open Pairs (1928–1962) (1) 1959
  - Mitchell Board-a-Match Teams (1) 1972
  - Reisinger (1) 1972
  - Spingold (3) 1960, 1966, 1969
