= Ira Rubin =

American bridge player (1930–2013)

Ira Rubin (1930 – February 6, 2013) was an American professional contract bridge player. Rubin attended the Bronx High School of Science and later New York University. Rubin lived in Fair Lawn and resided in nearby Paramus for 35 years.

Rubin learned to play bridge as a boy in the 1930s, from German-speaking refugees at Lake Placid, which he visited with his mother, who was not a player. At age nine, he and friends made up bidding conventions. He started to play tournament bridge when he was in high school, and in his thirties became a full-time player, which he was able to pursue because of his wife's income from her occupation in speech pathology. Known as "the Beast" for his intense style of playing, he invented several bidding systems in the game of bridge. He won 23 contract bridge titles, including the Bermuda Bowl in 1976.

Rubin died aged 82, survived by three children and four grandchildren. He is buried at Mount Moriah Cemetery in Fairview, Bergen County, New Jersey.

Rubin was inducted into the ACBL Hall of Fame in 2000.

== Bridge accomplishments ==
=== Honors ===
- ACBL Hall of Fame, 2000

=== Awards ===
- Fishbein Trophy (2) 1959, 1962
- Herman Trophy (1) 1970

=== Wins ===
- Bermuda Bowl (1) 1976
- North American Bridge Championships (19)
  - von Zedtwitz Life Master Pairs (1) 1962
  - Wernher Open Pairs (3) 1958, 1961, 1962
  - Blue Ribbon Pairs (1) 1970
  - Open Pairs (1928-1962) (1) 1961
  - Jacoby Open Swiss Teams (1) 1983
  - Vanderbilt (2) 1965, 1966
  - Reisinger (5) 1969, 1974, 1975, 1978, 1979
  - Spingold (5) 1956, 1959, 1966, 1979, 1985

=== Runners-up ===
- Bermuda Bowl (2) 1966, 1977
- North American Bridge Championships
  - von Zedtwitz Life Master Pairs (3) 1954, 1955, 1963
  - Wernher Open Pairs (1) 1955
  - Truscott Senior Swiss Teams (1) 2004
  - Vanderbilt (4) 1968, 1969, 1971, 1981
  - Mitchell Board-a-Match Teams (2) 1976, 1980
  - Chicago Mixed Board-a-Match (1) 1957
  - Reisinger (1) 1965
  - Spingold (2) 1957, 1969

== See also ==
- List of Bronx High School of Science alumni
- List of contract bridge people
