= Russ Ekeblad =

American bridge player

Russell Alfred Ekeblad (August 17, 1946 – December 12, 2018) was an American bridge player from Portsmouth, Rhode Island and Jupiter, Florida. Ekeblad was born in Evanston, Illinois and was a graduate of Brown University.

== Bridge accomplishments ==
=== Wins ===
- North American Bridge Championships (5)
  - Silodor Open Pairs (1) 1993
  - Grand National Teams (1) 2002
  - Spingold (3) 1992, 2005, 2009

=== Runners-up ===
- North American Bridge Championships
  - Blue Ribbon Pairs (1) 1999
  - Grand National Teams (1) 2003
  - Vanderbilt (1) 2008
  - Mitchell Board-a-Match Teams (1) 1997
  - Reisinger (1) 2006
