= Sol Mogal =

American bridge player

Solomon "Sol" Mogal (September 25, 1911 - April 6, 1989) was an American bridge player from Croton-on-Hudson, New York. He was born in New York on September 25, 1911. In the late 1930s, he became president of a Manhattan-based importing business, Mitchell Mogal. He died in Manhattan on April 6, 1989. He was 77 years old.

== Bridge accomplishments ==
=== Wins ===
- North American Bridge Championships (7)
  - Wernher Open Pairs (1) 1947
  - Marcus Cup (1) 1951
  - Mitchell Board-a-Match Teams (3) 1947, 1948, 1954
  - Spingold (2) 1946, 1949

=== Runners-up ===
- North American Bridge Championships
  - Reisinger (1) 1949
  - Spingold (1) 1952
