= Ross Grabel =

American bridge player

Ross Grabel (born 1950) is an American bridge player. He is from Huntington Beach, California.

== Bridge accomplishments ==
=== Wins ===
- North American Bridge Championships (5)
  - von Zedtwitz Life Master Pairs (1) 2013
  - Grand National Teams (1) 1998
  - Jacoby Open Swiss Teams (1) 1982
  - Mitchell Board-a-Match Teams (1) 1980
  - Reisinger (1) 1984

=== Runners-up ===
- North American Bridge Championships
  - Spingold (1) 1989
