= Hemant Lall =

American bridge player

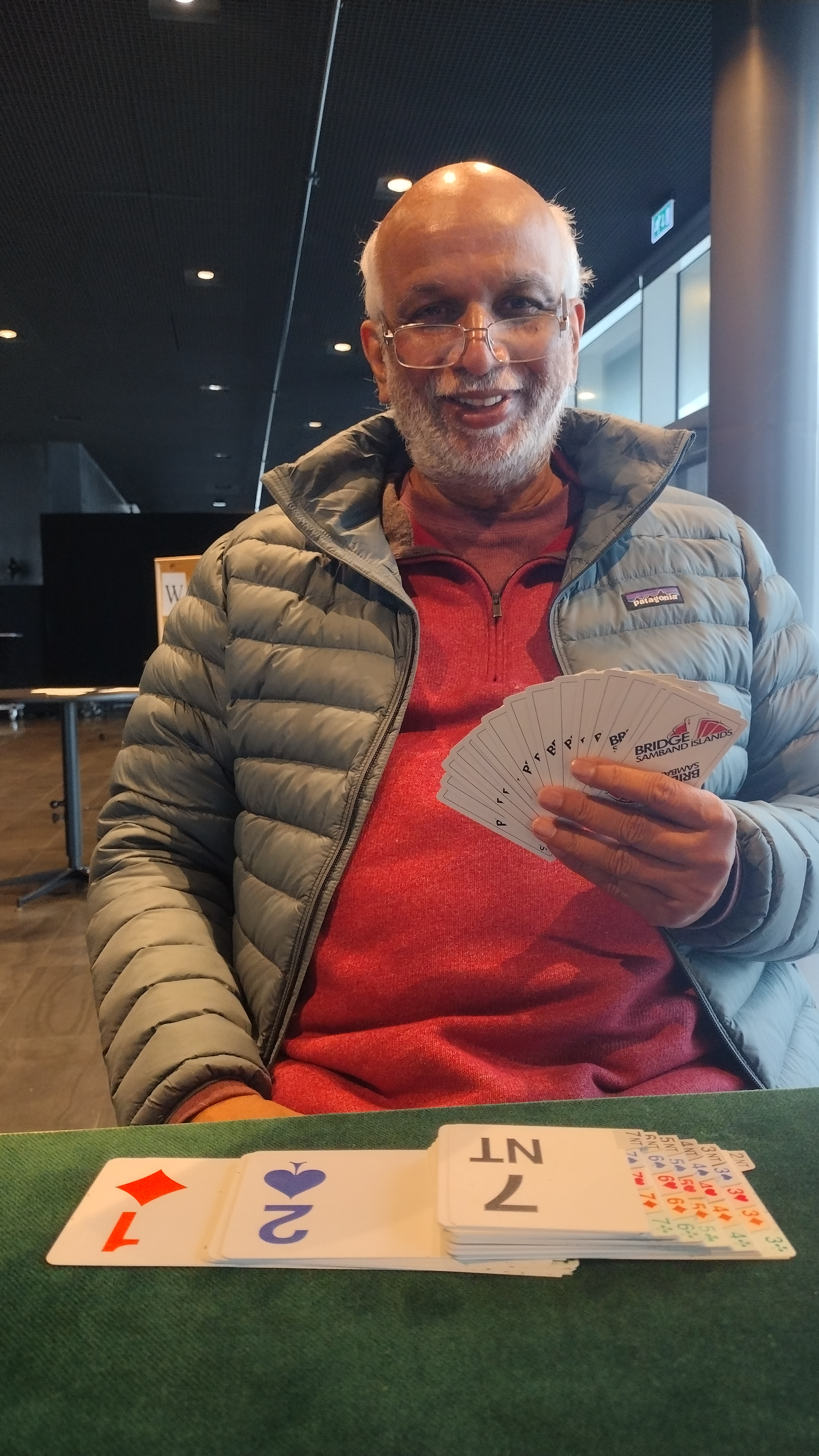
- Hemant Lall at the World Bridge Tour event in Iceland, January 2024
- Born: 1951 (age 74–75); India
- Occupation: bridge player

Hemant Lall (born 1951 in India) is an American bridge player, originally from India who now lives in Marina Del Rey, California. His son, Justin Lall, was also a bridge player. He worked for Perot Systems from 1989 to 2001.

== Bridge accomplishments ==
=== Wins ===
- North American Bridge Championships (6)
  - von Zedtwitz Life Master Pairs (1) 1992
  - Freeman Mixed Board-a-Match (1) 2011
  - Grand National Teams (1) 2006
  - Chicago Mixed Board-a-Match (2) 2003, 2005
  - Spingold (1) 2007

=== Runners-up ===
- North American Bridge Championships
  - von Zedtwitz Life Master Pairs (1) 2009
  - Rockwell Mixed Pairs (1) 1980
  - Nail Life Master Open Pairs (1) 2009
  - Keohane North American Swiss Teams (1) 2009
  - Spingold (1) 1993

== Personal life ==
Hemant is divorced with two children, Jessica and Justin Lall. He has a master's degree in computer science from SMU.
