= Brad Moss =

American bridge player

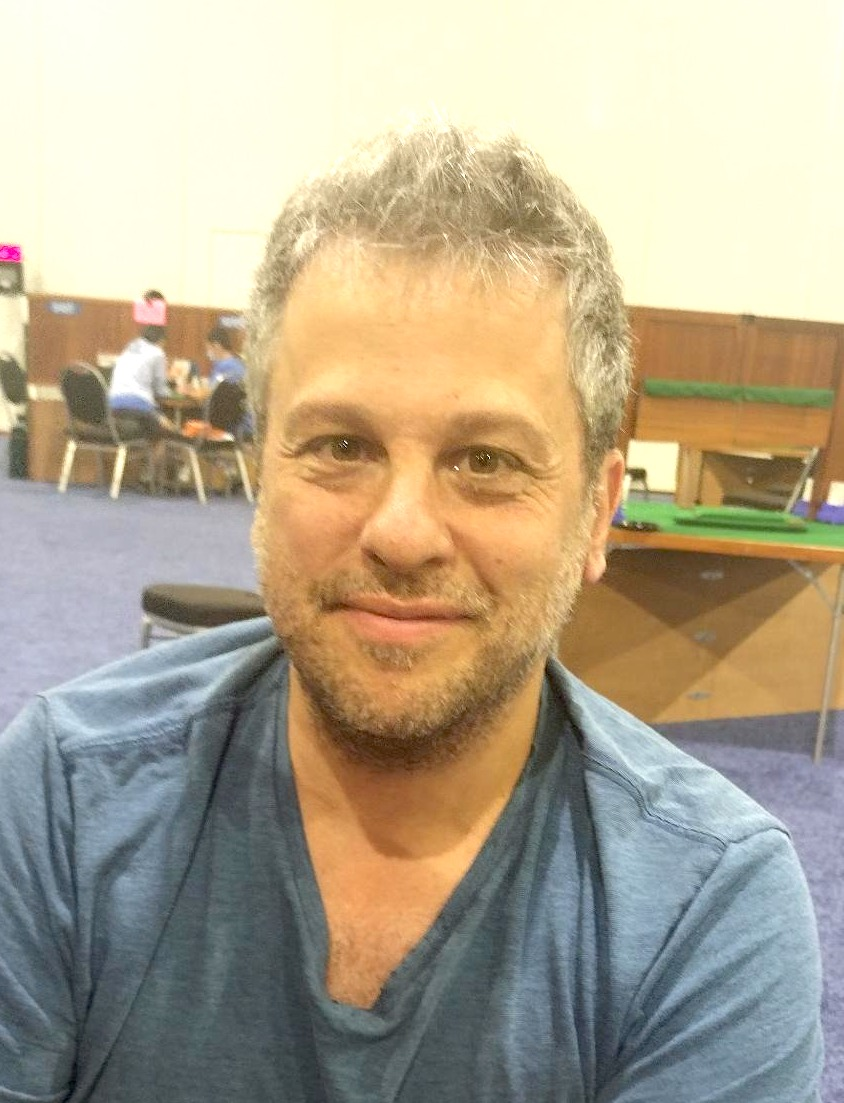
- Born: Brad Moss; 1971 (age 54–55)

Michael Brad Moss (born February 5, 1971) is an American bridge player from Berkeley, California and New York City. He is the son of Gail Greenberg.

== Bridge accomplishments ==
=== Awards ===
- ACBL King or Queen of Bridge (1) 1989
- ACBL Player of the Year (1) 2010
- Goren Trophy (1) 2010

=== Wins ===
- Bermuda Bowl (1) 2017
- World Championship Rosenblum Teams (1) 2010
- North American Bridge Championships (14)
  - Nail Life Master Open Pairs (1) 1993
  - Grand National Teams (1) 1993
  - Jacoby Open Swiss Teams (1) 2010
  - Roth Open Swiss Teams (1) 2012
  - Mitchell Board-a-Match Teams (2) 1998, 2018
  - Chicago Mixed Board-a-Match (1) 1991
  - Reisinger (1) 2001
  - Spingold (3) 2005, 2010, 2016
  - Von Zedtwitz Life Master Pairs (1) 2019
  - Vanderbilt Trophy (2) 2018, 2023

=== Runners-up ===
- North American Bridge Championships (12)
  - von Zedtwitz Life Master Pairs (1) 1999
  - Lebhar IMP Pairs (1) 1995
  - Blue Ribbon Pairs (1) 1992
  - Nail Life Master Open Pairs (1) 2010
  - Jacoby Open Swiss Teams (2) 2002, 2015
  - Vanderbilt (2) 2009, 2012
  - Reisinger (1) 2006
  - Spingold (2) 2000, 2013
  - Keohane North American Swiss Teams (1) 2021
