= Albert Weiss =

American bridge player

Albert "Dingy" Weiss (December 24, 1900 - September 1981) was an American bridge player from Miami Beach, Florida.

== Bridge accomplishments ==
=== Wins ===
- North American Bridge Championships (8)
  - Senior Masters Individual (1) 1947
  - Open Pairs (1928-1962) (2) 1939, 1951
  - Vanderbilt (3) 1948, 1963, 1965
  - Mitchell Board-a-Match Teams (1) 1946
  - Spingold (1) 1953

=== Runners-up ===
- North American Bridge Championships
  - Masters Individual (1) 1945
  - von Zedtwitz Life Master Pairs (3) 1949, 1952, 1962
  - Vanderbilt (1) 1960
  - Mitchell Board-a-Match Teams (1) 1952
  - Reisinger (1) 1936
  - Spingold (1) 1972
