= Jeff Glick =

American bridge player

Jefferson B. Glick (November 23, 1906 – July 31, 1985) was an American bridge player.

Glick was from North Miami Beach, Florida.

== Bridge accomplishments ==
=== Wins ===
- North American Bridge Championships (9)
  - Hilliard Mixed Pairs (1) 1941
  - Spingold (1) 1934
  - Marcus Cup (1) 1951
  - Mitchell Board-a-Match Teams (4) 1947, 1948, 1954, 1958
  - Reisinger (1) 1940
  - Spingold (1) 1949

=== Runners-up ===
- North American Bridge Championships
  - Masters Team of 4 (1) 1934
  - Reisinger (2) 1949, 1952
  - Spingold (2) 1946, 1952
