= Geoff Hampson =

Canadian professional bridge player (born 1968)

Geoff Hampson (born 1968) is a Canadian professional bridge player. Hampson is from Toronto and the son of Sharon Hampson (née Trostin) of Sharon, Lois & Bram and American folk singer Joe Hampson.

== Bridge accomplishments ==
=== Awards ===
- Fishbein Trophy (1) 2005
- Herman Trophy (1) 2003
- Mott-Smith Trophy (1) 2003

=== Wins ===
- North American Bridge Championships (17)
  - von Zedtwitz Life Master Pairs (1) 1998
  - Lebhar IMP Pairs (1) 2006
  - Fast Open Pairs (2) 2007, 2011
  - Rockwell Mixed Pairs (1) 1994
  - Silodor Open Pairs (2) 1997, 2014
  - Wernher Open Pairs (1) 2003
  - Nail Life Master Open Pairs (1) 2002
  - Jacoby Open Swiss Teams (1) 2010
  - Roth Open Swiss Teams (1) 2012
  - Keohane North American Swiss Teams (1) 1992
  - Reisinger (1) 2003
  - Roth Open Swiss Teams (1) 2007
  - Spingold (2) 2005, 2010
  - Mitchell Board-a-Match Teams (1) 2018

=== Runners-up ===
- North American Bridge Championships
  - von Zedtwitz Life Master Pairs (1) 2008
  - Wernher Open Pairs (2) 1992, 2002
  - Blue Ribbon Pairs (2) 2003, 2012
  - Grand National Teams (1) 1996
  - Jacoby Open Swiss Teams (1) 2003
  - Vanderbilt (3) 2007, 2009, 2012
  - Keohane North American Swiss Teams (1) 2002
