= Alvin Landy =

American bridge player

Alvin Landy (1905–1967) was an American bridge administrator and player.

Creator of the Landy convention, he was inducted into the American Contract Bridge League's Hall of Fame in 1998.

== Bridge accomplishments ==
=== Honors ===
- ACBL Hall of Fame 1998
- ACBL Honorary Member 1957

=== Awards ===
- von Zedtwitz Award 1998

=== Wins ===
- North American Bridge Championships (8)
  - Spingold (1) 1936
  - Marcus Cup (1) 1951
  - Mitchell Board-a-Match Teams (4) 1947, 1948, 1954, 1958
  - Chicago Mixed Board-a-Match (1) 1939
  - Spingold (1) 1949

=== Runners-up ===
- North American Bridge Championships (4)
  - Masters Individual (1) 1939
  - Reisinger (1) 1949
  - Spingold (2) 1946, 1952
