= Brian Glubok =

American bridge player

Brian Glubok (born 1959) is a professional American bridge player. Glubok is from New York City and graduated from Amherst College.

Glubok finished second in the World Mixed Pairs Championship in Philadelphia in 2010. Glubok has won 5 North American Bridge Championships.

== Bridge accomplishments ==
=== Wins ===
- North American Bridge Championships (5)
  - Jacoby Open Swiss Teams (3) 1996, 1997, 1999
  - Reisinger (1) 1990
  - Spingold (1) 1987

=== Runners-up ===
- World Mixed Pairs Championship (1) 2010
- North American Bridge Championships
  - Blue Ribbon Pairs (1) 1990
  - Grand National Teams (4) 1981, 2009, 2012, 2013
  - Jacoby Open Swiss Teams (1) 2007
  - Mitchell Board-a-Match Teams (2) 1994, 2003
  - Reisinger (1) 2008
  - Spingold (4) 1980, 1983, 1986, 2008
