= Tobias Stone =

American bridge player (1919–2012)

Tobias Stone (June 8, 1919 – February 15, 2012) was an American bridge player and writer from New York City.

Stone was born in Manhattan. He and Janice Gilbert married in 1955; divorced in 1975. He retired from bridge and in 1986 moved to Las Vegas, where he died in 2012.

Stone was inducted into the ACBL Hall of Fame in 2003.

== Publications ==
- with Roth, Alvin (1958). Bridge is a Partnership Game: The Roth-Stone System (1st ed.). E.P. Dutton & Co., Inc. LCCN 58-9305. 237 pages.
- with Roth, Alvin (1989). Bridge is a Partnership Game: The Roth-Stone System (2nd ed.). Ballston Lake, NY: Granovetter Books. OCLC 22757918. 237 pages. Preface revised by Alvin Roth.

== Bridge accomplishments ==
=== Honors ===
- ACBL Hall of Fame, 2003

=== Awards ===
- Fishbein Trophy (1) 1956

=== Wins ===
- North American Bridge Championships (16)
  - Master Individual (1) 1953
  - von Zedtwitz Life Master Pairs (1) 1956
  - Wernher Open Pairs (1) 1947
  - Open Pairs (1928-1962) (1) 1942
  - Vanderbilt (3) 1943, 1959, 1960
  - Marcus Cup (1) 1960
  - Mitchell Board-a-Match Teams (2) 1961, 1963
  - Chicago Mixed Board-a-Match (1) 1965
  - Reisinger (2) 1952, 1961
  - Spingold (3) 1953, 1956, 1957

=== Runners-up ===
- Bermuda Bowl (1) 1958
- North American Bridge Championships
  - von Zedtwitz Life Master Pairs (2) 1942, 1965
  - Silodor Open Pairs (2) 1958, 1965
  - Wernher Open Pairs (1) 1952
  - Hilliard Mixed Pairs (1) 1956
  - Open Pairs (1928-1962) (1) 1958
  - Vanderbilt (2) 1966, 1969
  - Mitchell Board-a-Match Teams (2) 1952, 1959
  - Chicago Mixed Board-a-Match (2) 1942, 1956
  - Spingold (2) 1961, 1963
