= Hapeville, Georgia =

City in Georgia, United States

- City
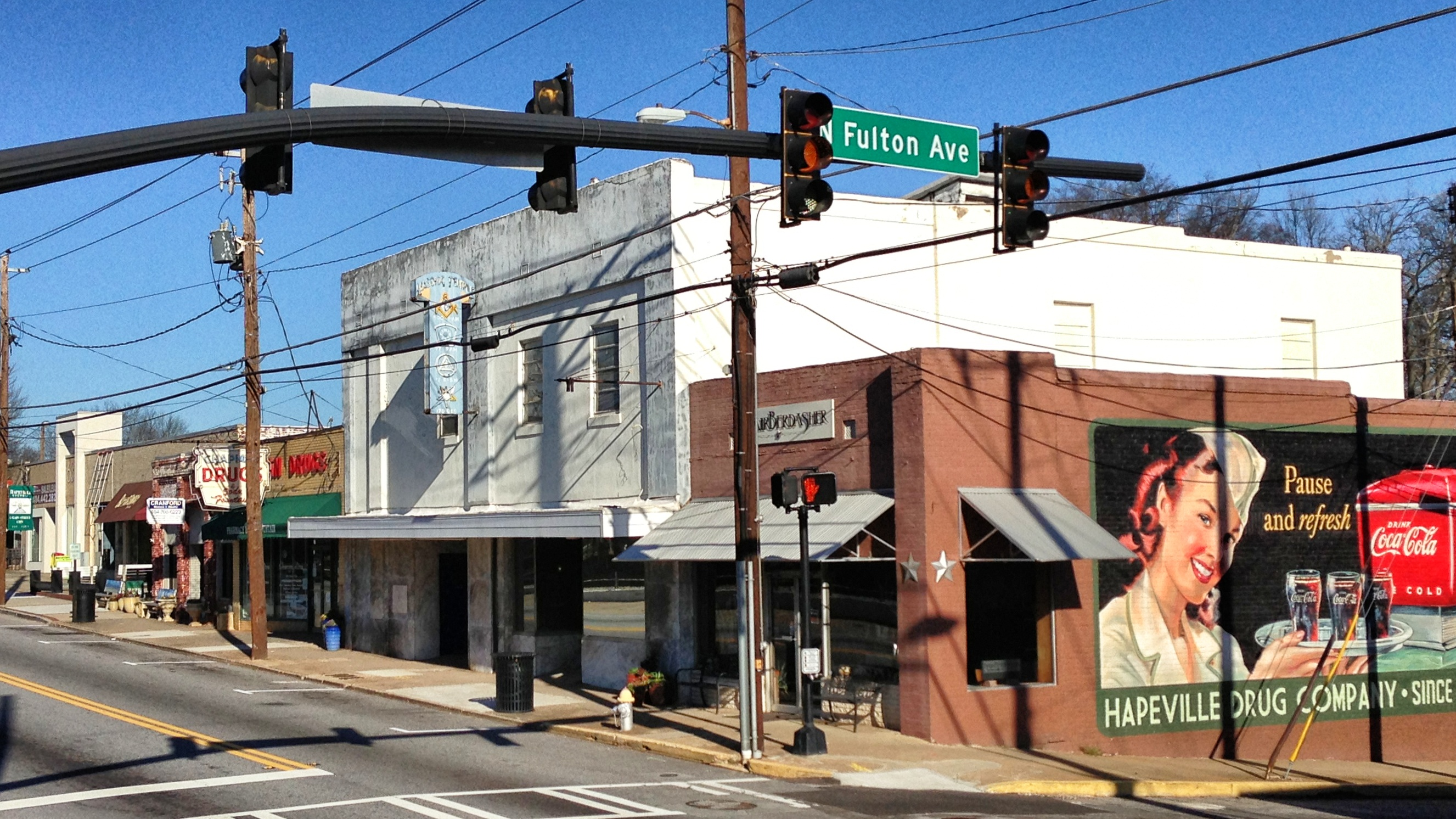
- Downtown Hapeville

- Flag Logo

- Location in Fulton County and the state of Georgia

- Location within Georgia Location within the United States
- Coordinates: 33°39′39″N 84°24′34″W
- Country: United States
- State: Georgia
- County: Fulton

Area
  - Total: 2.41 sq mi (6.23 km^{2})
  - Land: 2.41 sq mi (6.23 km^{2})
  - Water: 0 sq mi (0.00 km^{2})
- Elevation: 984 ft (300 m)

Population (2020)
  - Total: 6,553
  - Density: 2,723.6/sq mi (1,051.59/km^{2})
- Time zone: UTC-5 (Eastern (EST))
  - Summer (DST): UTC-4 (EDT)
- ZIP code: 30354
- Area code: 404
- FIPS code: 13-36472
- GNIS feature ID: 2403795
- Website: hapeville.org

Hapeville, established 1891, is a city in Fulton County, Georgia, United States. The population was 6,553 at the 2020 census, an increase of 180 residents from the 2010 census.

== Etymology ==
Hapeville is named for Dr. Samuel Hape, one of the area's original landowners and its first mayor. Dr. Hape and other members of his family are buried in Atlanta's Oakland Cemetery.

== History ==
During the 1950s and 1960s, Hapeville was a thriving part of the Tri-City (Hapeville, East Point, College Park) area and its post-World War II population supported four elementary schools (Josephine Wells, North Avenue, College Street, and St. John's Catholic school) and one high school. During the 40 years following, it became regarded as a somewhat depressed industrial area. Since 2005, Hapeville has seen significant gentrification, beginning with the Virginia Park neighborhood and then spreading throughout the city. Hapeville has been discovered by young professionals seeking historic neighborhoods close to downtown Atlanta, and there has been a great deal of new residential construction, including single-family homes, townhomes, and upscale apartments. This new residential development has led to a revived historic downtown. Hapeville has also been discovered by metro Atlanta's arts community, and the beginnings of an artist colony have taken shape with the formation of the Hapeville Arts Alliance. The Hapeville Historic District is listed on the National Register of Historic Places.

From 1947 until 2006, Hapeville was home to the Ford Atlanta Assembly Plant, recently manufacturing the Taurus. There are development plans to open a multi-use development, Aerotropolis Atlanta, on the site, which is adjacent to Atlanta Airport.

Hapeville is also home to the Dwarf House - the first Chick-fil-A restaurant which was totally rebuilt and greatly expanded in 2021, the original location's 4th incarnation. Hapeville is also home to portions of the Porsche North American Headquarters. While Porsche's headquarters building is technically located in Atlanta, its Porsche Classic Cars Restoration Facility, Porsche Service Center, and portions of the Porsche Experience track are all in Hapeville.

== Geography ==
According to the United States Census Bureau, the city has a total area of 2.4 square miles (6.2 km^{2}), all land.

== Demographics ==
Historical population
Census	Pop.	Note	%±
1880	79		—
1900	545		—
1910	864		58.5%
1920	1,631		88.8%
1930	4,224		159.0%
1940	5,059		19.8%
1950	8,560		69.2%
1960	10,082		17.8%
1970	9,567		−5.1%
1980	6,166		−35.5%
1990	5,483		−11.1%
2000	6,180		12.7%
2010	6,373		3.1%
2020	6,553		2.8%
2025 (est.)	7,410	▲	13.1%
U.S. Decennial Census; 1850-1870 1870-1880; 1890-1910 1920-1930; 1940 1950 1960; 1970 1980 1990; 2000 2010; 2025

=== Racial and ethnic composition ===
Hapeville city, Georgia – Racial and ethnic composition Note: the US Census treats Hispanic/Latino as an ethnic category. This table excludes Latinos from the racial categories and assigns them to a separate category. Hispanics/Latinos may be of any race.
Race / Ethnicity (NH = Non-Hispanic)	Pop 2000	Pop 2010	Pop 2020	% 2000	% 2010	% 2020
White alone (NH)	2,597	1,843	1,574	42.02%	28.92%	24.02%
Black or African American alone (NH)	1,567	1,804	2,339	25.36%	28.31%	35.69%
Native American or Alaska Native alone (NH)	19	6	24	0.31%	0.09%	0.37%
Asian alone (NH)	541	365	262	8.75%	5.73%	4.00%
Native Hawaiian or Pacific Islander alone (NH)	6	3	3	0.10%	0.05%	0.05%
Other race alone (NH)	11	13	57	0.18%	0.20%	0.87%
Mixed race or Multiracial (NH)	91	99	228	1.47%	1.55%	3.48%
Hispanic or Latino (any race)	1,348	2,240	2,066	21.81%	35.15%	31.53%
Total	6,180	6,373	6,553	100.00%	100.00%	100.00%

=== 2020 census ===
As of the 2020 census, Hapeville had a population of 6,553. The median age was 36.4 years. 22.8% of residents were under the age of 18 and 10.2% of residents were 65 years of age or older. For every 100 females, there were 105.3 males, and for every 100 females age 18 and over, there were 108.2 males age 18 and over.

100.0% of residents lived in urban areas, while 0.0% lived in rural areas.

There were 2,737 households in Hapeville, including 1,078 families, of which 28.5% had children under the age of 18 living in them. Of all households, 26.5% were married-couple households, 31.8% were households with a male householder and no spouse or partner present, and 33.1% were households with a female householder and no spouse or partner present. About 36.5% of all households were made up of individuals and 8.2% had someone living alone who was 65 years of age or older.

There were 2,997 housing units, of which 8.7% were vacant. The homeowner vacancy rate was 4.2% and the rental vacancy rate was 5.2%.

== Economy ==
Korean Air Cargo's U.S. headquarters are in Hapeville, near the northeast corner of the Hartsfield-Jackson Atlanta International Airport.

== Education ==
Hapeville is a part of Fulton County Schools. Residents are zoned to Hapeville Elementary School, Paul D. West Middle School in East Point, and Tri-Cities High School in East Point. In addition, Hapeville Charter Middle School is located in Hapeville.

Private schools include St. John the Evangelist Catholic School of the Roman Catholic Archdiocese of Atlanta.

The Atlanta-Fulton Public Library System operates the Hapeville Branch.

== Emergency services ==
The city is served by the Hapeville Police Department headquartered on Doug Davis Drive. The city is also served by the Hapeville and EMS Fire Department, which operates three stations.

== Notable people ==
- Comedian Jeff Foxworthy was raised in Hapeville and graduated from Hapeville High School.
- Educator and politician Hank Huckaby was raised in Hapeville.

== Gallery ==
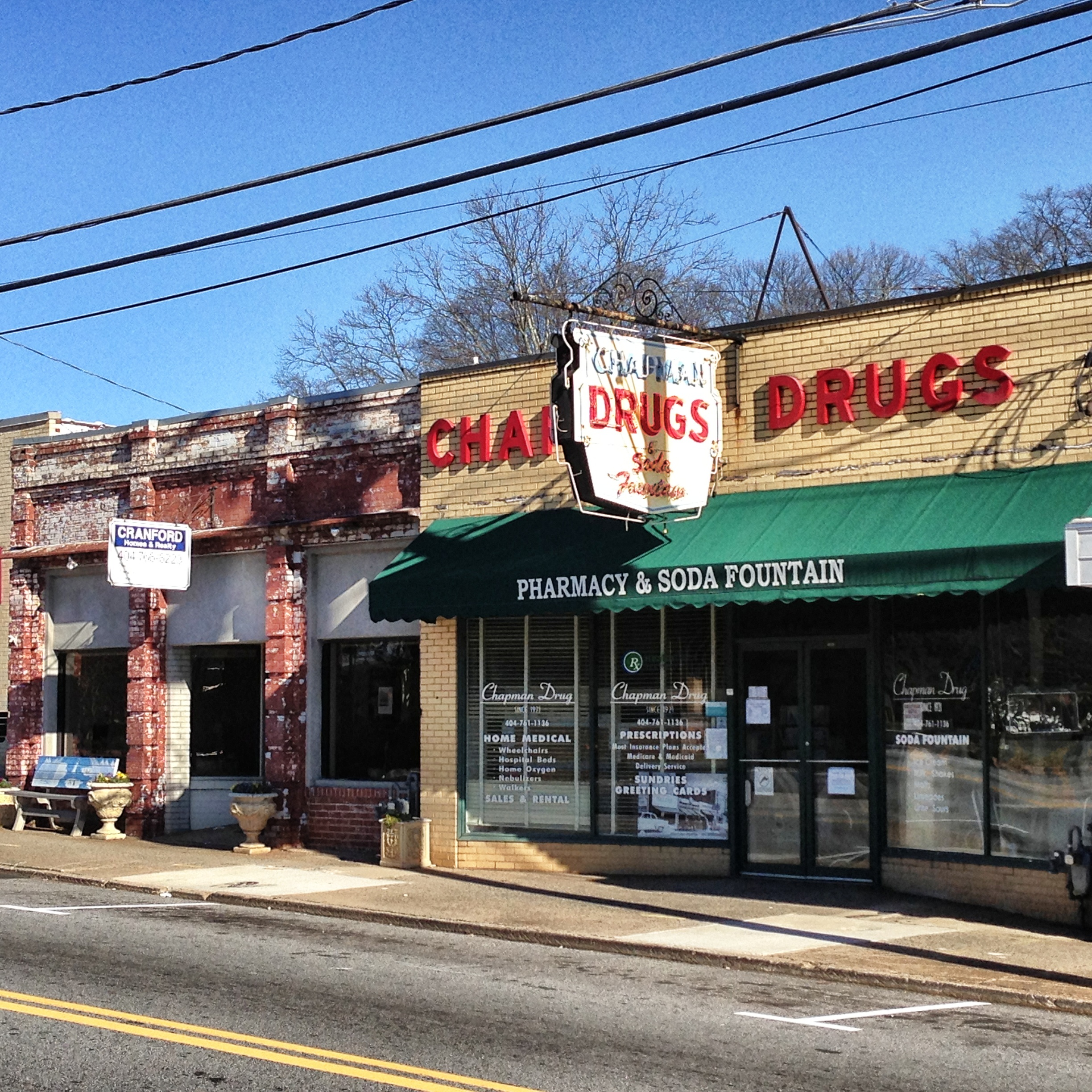
Downtown Hapeville

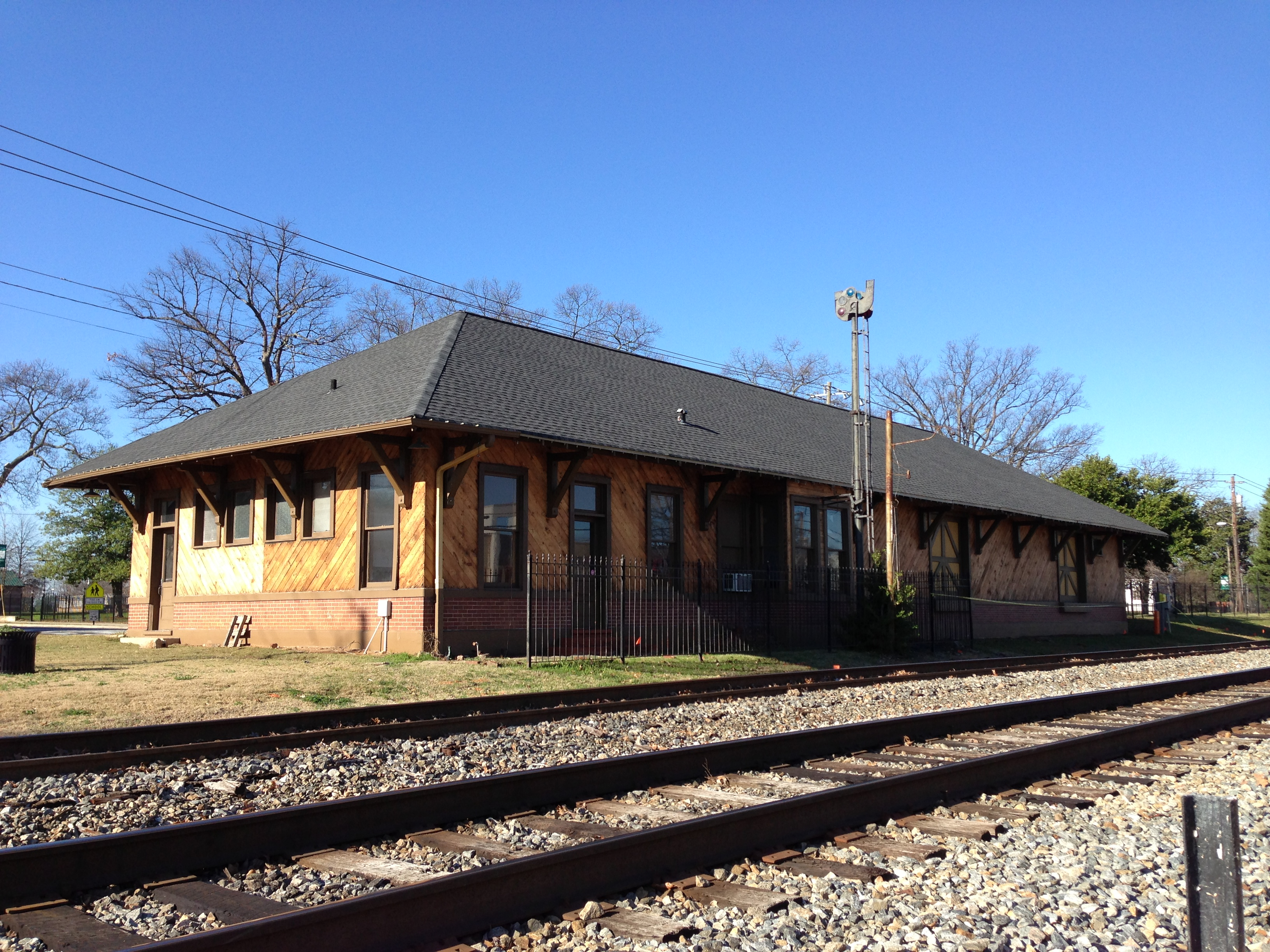
Hapeville Depot

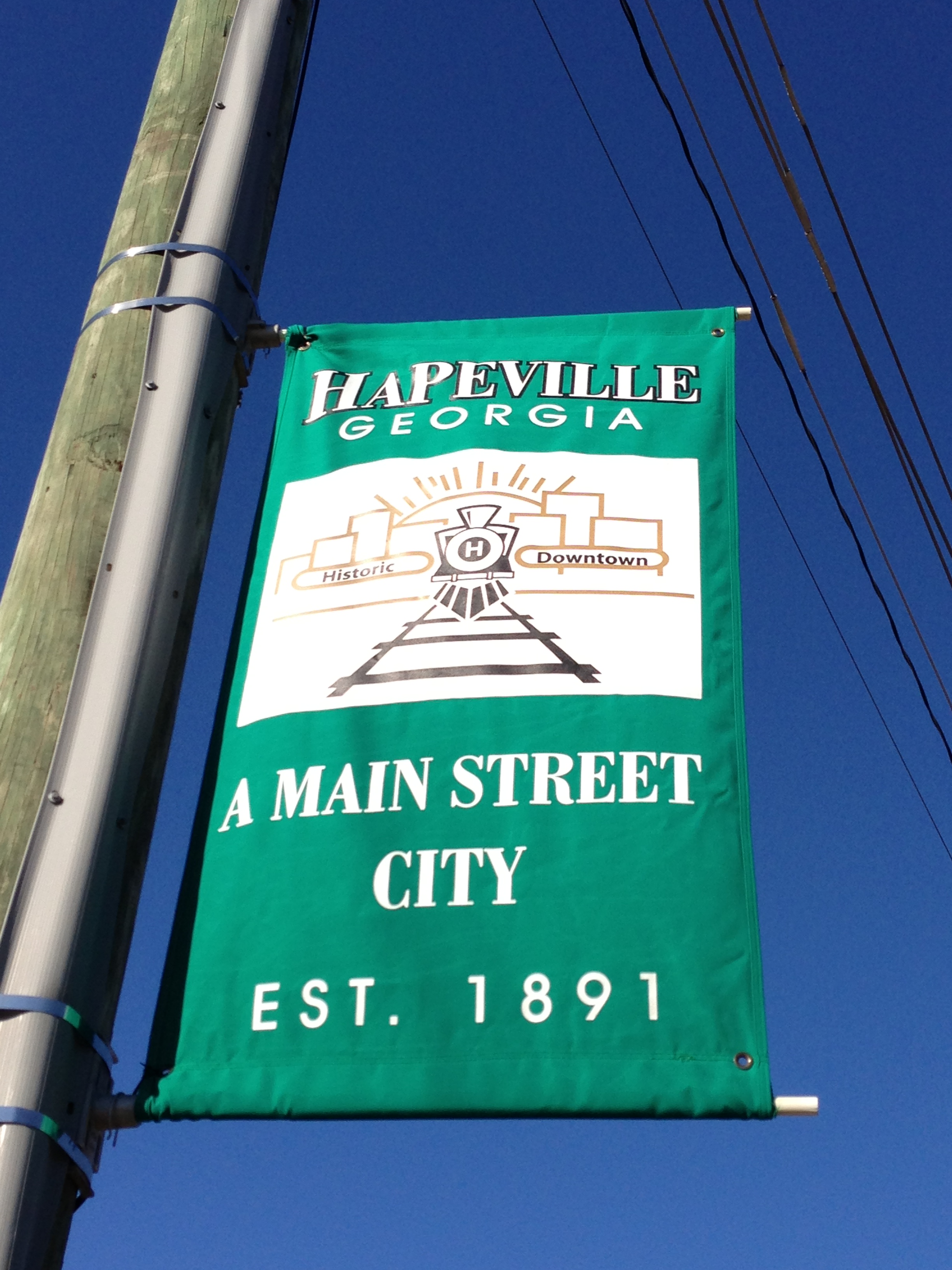
Banner downtown

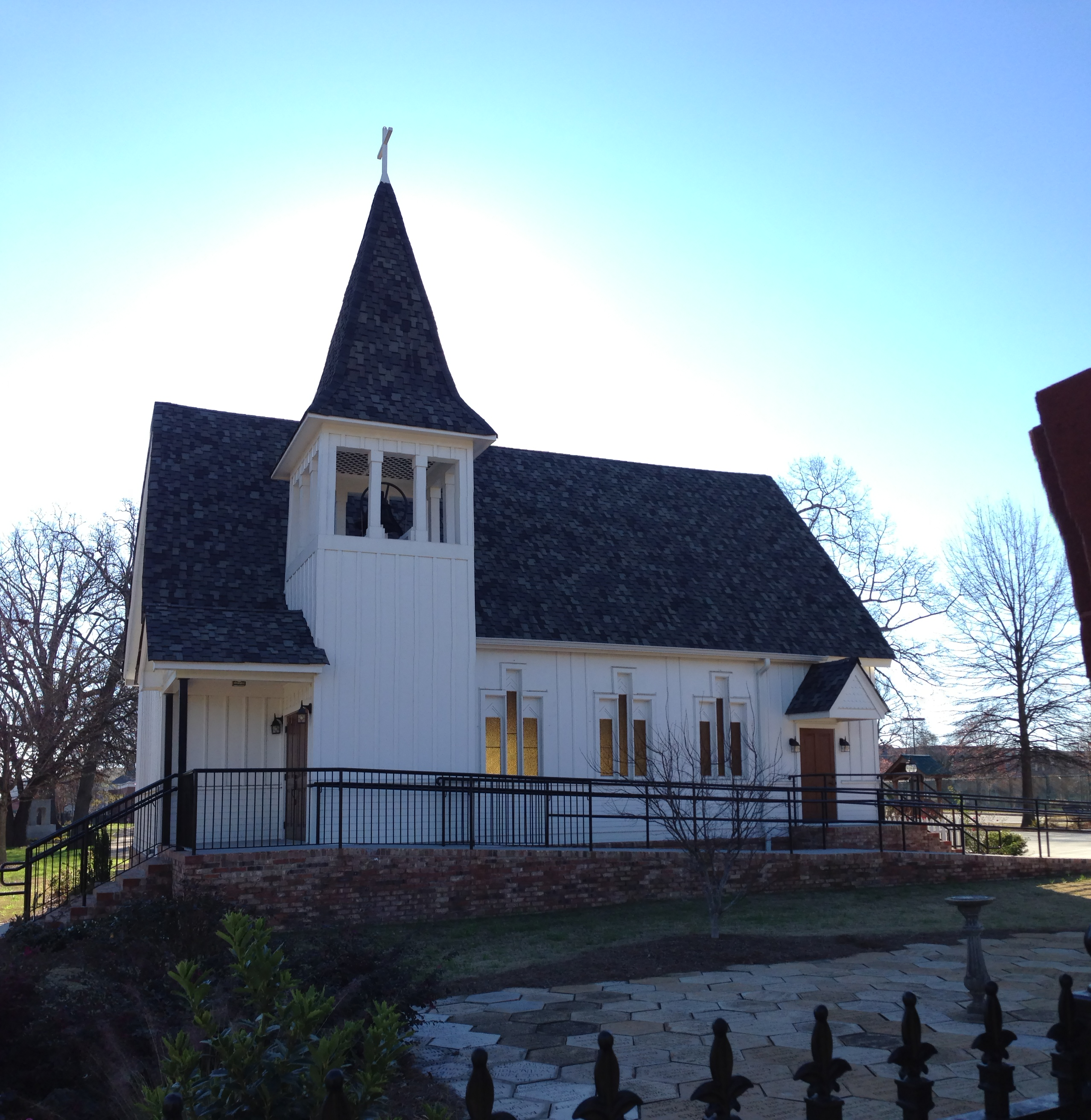
Historic Christ Church (1895)

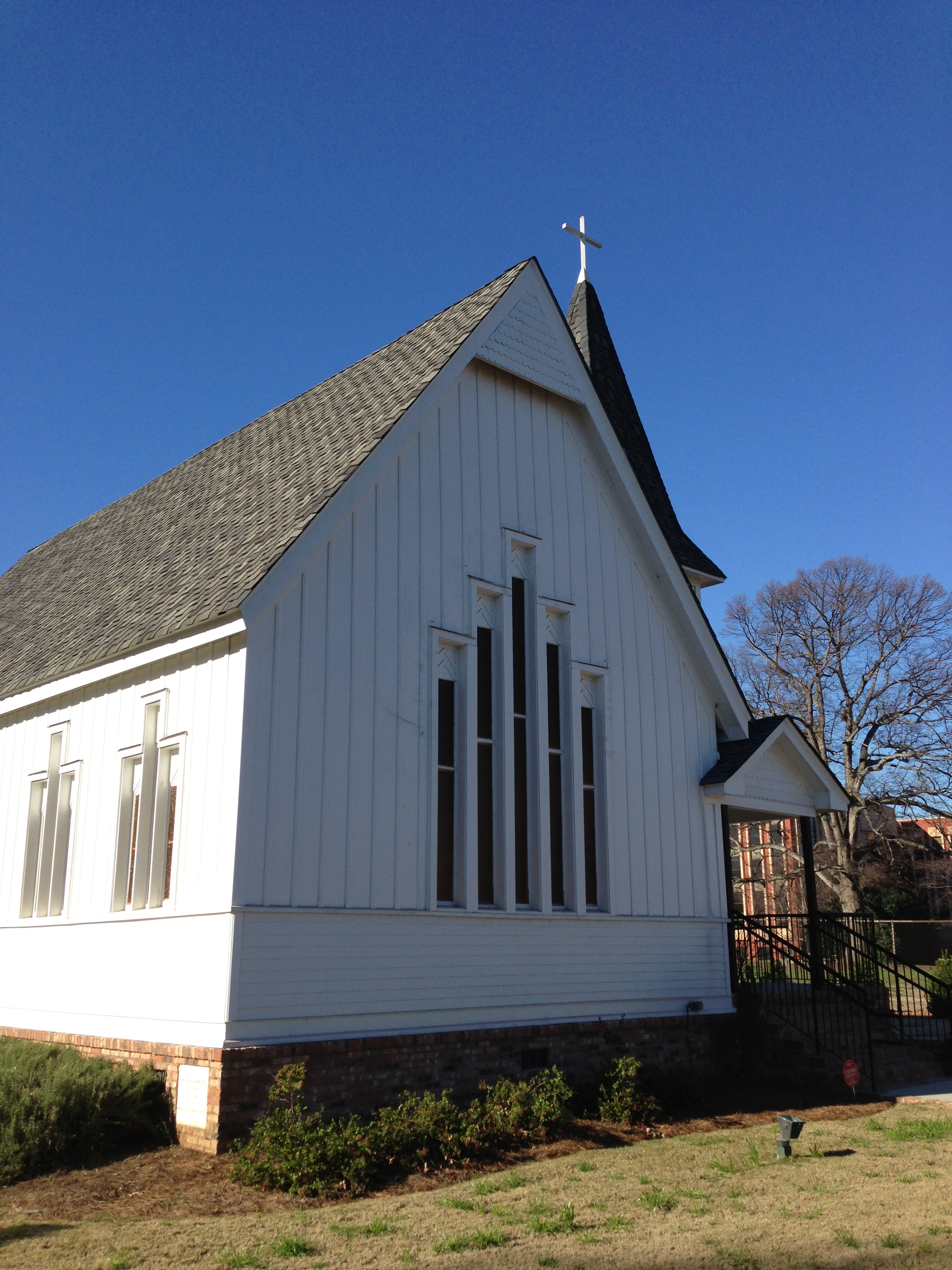
Historic Christ Church (1895)
