= Richard Freeman (bridge) =

American bridge player

Richard A. Freeman (July 21, 1933 – June 29, 2009) was a world champion American bridge player holding the title of World Grand Master, the highest title of the World Bridge Federation. He won the Bermuda Bowl world team championship and won many national championships. Freeman was inducted into the ACBL Hall of Fame in 2001. At the time of his death he held 17,880 masterpoints.

== Early life ==
He was born in 1933, and was from Atlanta, Georgia. He was a radio Quiz Kid in 1942. In 1952, Freeman became the youngest Life Master in the ACBL ever at that time. In January 1964, he became editor of newly published Modern Bridge magazine. In 1993 he was a founding member of the Nick Nickell team where he played until his death as Nickell's professional partner. He died in Atlanta.

By age 13 Freeman was in his third year at the University of Chicago. He later graduated from the University of Chicago and received a J.D. from George Washington University.

== Bridge accomplishments ==
=== Honors ===
- ACBL Hall of Fame 2001

=== Awards ===
- Fishbein Trophy (1) 1995

=== Wins ===
- Bermuda Bowl (3) 1995, 2000, 2003
- North American Bridge Championships (22)
  - von Zedtwitz Life Master Pairs (1) 2003
  - Vanderbilt (2) 1979, 2000
  - Marcus Cup (1) 1953
  - Mitchell Board-a-Match Teams (3) 1955, 1962, 1966
  - Chicago Mixed Board-a-Match (1) 1961
  - Reisinger (6) 1993, 1994, 1995, 2004, 2005, 2008
  - Spingold (8) 1993, 1994, 1995, 1996, 1998, 1999, 2004, 2006

=== Runners-up ===
- Bermuda Bowl (2) 1997, 2005
- Buffett Cup (1) 2008
- North American Bridge Championships (14)
  - Silodor Open Pairs (1) 2007
  - Blue Ribbon Pairs (1) 1970
  - Grand National Teams (1) 1983
  - Vanderbilt (3) 1975, 1996, 2002
  - Mitchell Board-a-Match Teams (6) 1957, 1958, 1977, 1983, 1998, 1999
  - Reisinger (1) 1965
  - Spingold (1) 1959
