= Peter Weichsel =

American bridge player (1943)

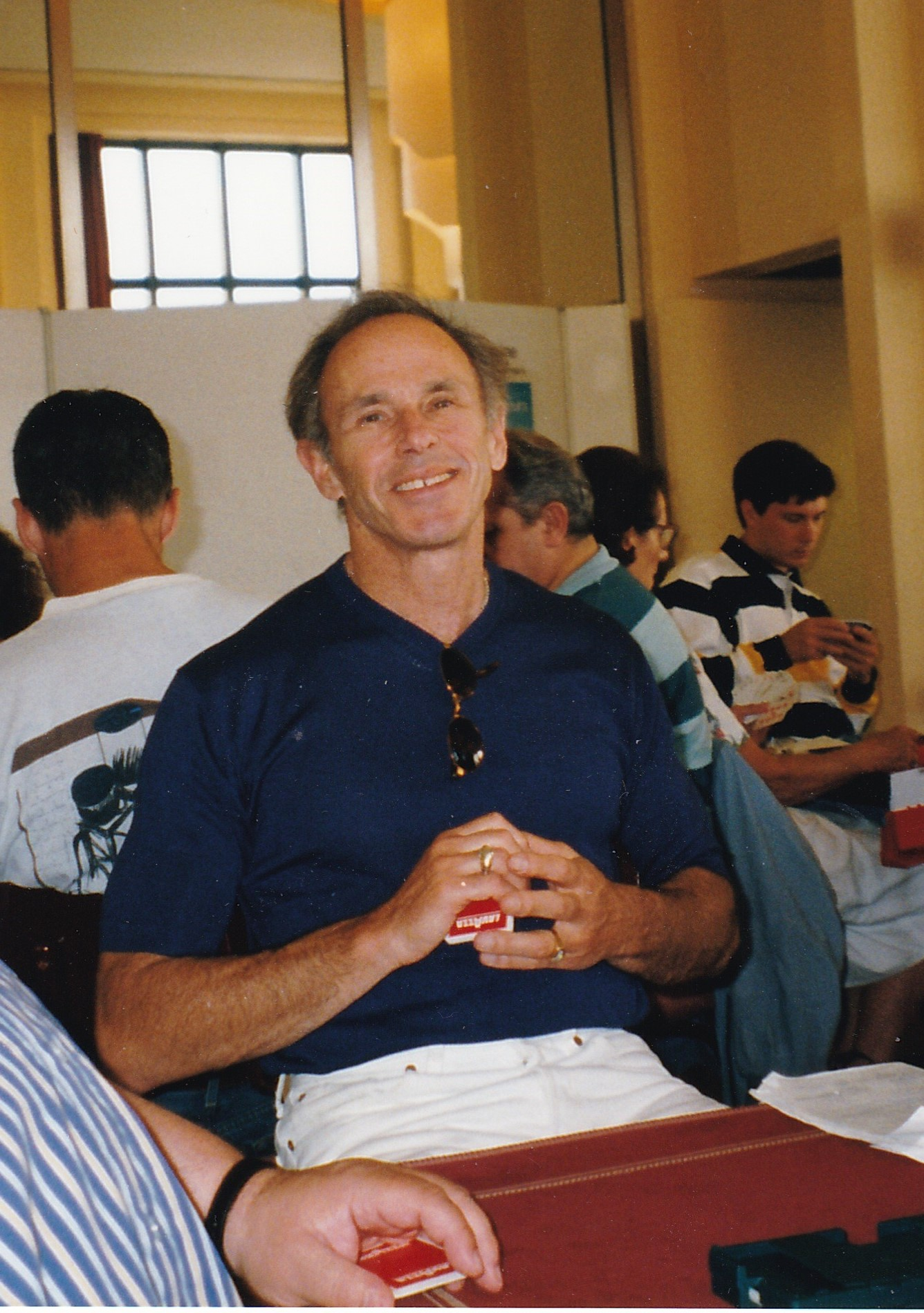
Peter Weichsel

Peter M. Weichsel (born 1943) is an American professional bridge player from Encinitas, California.

== College and war years ==
Early Weichsel started playing bridge at home with his family, but did not get hooked until 1963 when he was a student at Queens College, New York. He dropped out of college and became a Life Master in 1964. His bridge career was interrupted by the Vietnam War. He served two years duty in the Navy as a winch driver aboard the USS Mount Katmai, responsible for moving large bombs out of the hold. After discharge, he lived in San Francisco in a fleabag hotel and became an "active member" of the counterculture. He felt this was a transforming experience and to the present describes himself as a reformed hippie.

== The Precision Team and Hall of Fame ==
Weichsel returned to New York and bridge playing in the mid-1960s. His appearance, with puka shells around his neck, "really long" straight hair, beads and bell bottoms, caused "the ultra-straight bridge community" to give him "tons of strange looks...and an occasional shake of the head." He did not get a haircut until 1980. Seen as a young renegade, Weichsel feels that his looks may have helped his results, lulling unknowing opponents into thinking he could not have been much of a bridge player.

He came to prominence in 1970 as a member of C.C. Wei's "Precision Team", a group of young American players that won the Spingold, defeating the defending champions who were also 1970 Bermuda Bowl champions. The bridge world was described as being in disbelief by their victory. When he won the 2019 Mitchell BAM, he had the distinction of winning a national title in every decade since the 1970s.

Weichsel was inducted into the ACBL Hall of Fame in 2004.

== Bridge accomplishments ==
=== Honors ===
- ACBL Hall of Fame, 2004

=== Awards ===
- Fishbein Trophy (2) 1980, 2000

=== Wins ===
- Bermuda Bowl (2) 1983, 2001
- World Mixed Pairs (1) 1990
- North American Bridge Championships (25)
  - von Zedtwitz Life Master Pairs (2) 1977, 1984
  - Silodor Open Pairs (1) 1993
  - Wernher Open Pairs (2) 1980, 1984
  - Nail Life Master Open Pairs (1) 1971
  - Grand National Teams (1) 2003
  - Vanderbilt (4) 1972, 1985, 1989, 1999
  - Mitchell Board-a-Match Teams (5) 1979, 1987, 1996, 2001, 2019
  - Chicago Mixed Board-a-Match (3) 1976, 1989, 2001
  - Reisinger (1) 1973
  - Spingold (6) 1970, 1971, 1980, 1982, 1992, 2000

=== Runners-up ===
- North American Bridge Championships (19)
  - von Zedtwitz Life Master Pairs (1) 1972
  - Lebhar IMP Pairs (1) 1987
  - Blue Ribbon Pairs (1) 1983
  - Nail Life Master Open Pairs (1) 1989
  - Grand National Teams (2) 2000, 2001
  - Jacoby Open Swiss Teams (1) 2000
  - Vanderbilt (3) 1975, 1981, 2008
  - Mitchell Board-a-Match Teams (2) 1968, 1990
  - Chicago Mixed Board-a-Match (1) 2004
  - Reisinger (2) 1983, 1998
  - Spingold (4) 1985, 1988, 1991, 2003
