= Mike Becker =

American bridge player (born 1943)

Mike Becker (born 1943) is an American bridge player and official. Becker is from Boca Raton, Florida. He is a son of B. Jay Becker.

As of 1979, Becker and Ron Rubin were partners in a New York City options firm and at the bridge table. Becker trained more than 50 bridge players, 15 of whom were national champions. At bridge they used a strong one-club, relay bidding system that they called "the Ultimate Club". They played on the last of the "Aces" teams sponsored by Dallas businessman Ira Corn, which won the 1983 Bermuda Bowl world team championship.

In the American Contract Bridge League (ACBL) Becker was President of the Greater New York Bridge Association in 1980, chaired committees governing the U.S. International Team Trials from 1996 to 2012, and the Hall of Fame in 2003. He was the founding president of the United States Bridge Federation, established in 2001 primarily to select and support teams that represent the United States in world competition. He was inducted into the ACBL Hall of Fame in 2006.

== Publications ==
- The Ultimate Club, Mike Becker and others (New York: Monna Lisa Precision Corp., 1977)
- The Ultimate Club, Michael Becker, Matt Ginsberg, Matthew Granovetter, and Ron Rubin (Livingston, NJ: Ultimate Club, 1981)

== Bridge accomplishments ==
=== Honors ===
- ACBL Hall of Fame, 2006

=== Wins ===
- North American Bridge Championships (20)
  - von Zedtwitz Life Master Pairs (1) 1990
  - Silodor Open Pairs (1) 1988
  - Grand National Teams (7) 2007, 2008, 2011, 2012, 2013, 2015, 2018
  - Vanderbilt (6) 1977, 1981, 1985, 1989, 2005, 2019
  - Mitchell Board-a-Match Teams (3) 2007, 2012, 2019
  - Spingold (4) 1972, 1980, 1982, 1992
  - Reisinger (1) 2016

=== Runners-up ===
- North American Bridge Championships
  - von Zedtwitz Life Master Pairs (1) 1975
  - Silodor Open Pairs (1) 1998
  - Grand National Teams (2) 1981, 1992
  - Vanderbilt (3) 1978, 1999, 2004
  - Mitchell Board-a-Match Teams (2) 1968, 2008
  - Reisinger (5) 1967, 1983, 2002, 2004, 2007
  - Spingold (2) 1968, 1988
