= International SeaKeepers Society =

Non-profit ocean conservation organization

The International SeaKeepers Society
- Founded: 1998
- Founders: Albert Gersten
- Type: Nonprofit
- Tax ID no.: 58-2385869
- Legal status: 501(c)(3)
- Purpose: International Ocean Conservation
- Location: Coral Gables, Florida, United States
- Method: Research, Data Collection, Advocacy
- Members: 600+
- Key people: Paul Allen
- Employees: 5
- Website: www.seakeepers.org

The International SeaKeepers Society is an international charitable organization founded in 1998. The group was started by yacht owners with an initial focus on developing and utilizing instrumentation on yachts to monitor marine conditions in the ocean. Today, The International SeaKeepers Society continues to work with yachts. The International SeaKeepers Society is a 501(c)(3) organization. The organization works with governments, educational institutions, private foundations, and non-profit organizations.

== History ==
Businessman Albert Gersten founded the society with Tom Houston as its president, and recruited major yacht owners, including Microsoft founder Paul Allen, to support the start-up organization. A monitoring unit called the SeaKeeper 1000 was deployed on more than 90 platforms across the globe including yachts, cruise ships, buoys, and piers. While the SeaKeeper 1000 was active, the National Oceanic and Atmospheric Administration and the U.S. National Weather Service utilized the SeaKeeper 1000 on many of their NOAA vessels to better monitor oceanographic changes. The International SeaKeepers Society discontinued the SeaKeeper 1000 in October 2013.

=== SeaKeeper 1000 ===
The SeaKeeper 1000 unit was designed to record weather and near surface oceanographic data automatically. It then transmitted the data via NOAA satellites and through the Global Telecommunication System (GTS). The SeaKeeper 1000 unit won the 2002 Environment Award from The Tech Museum of Innovation. In 2002, 61 society members and 4 cruise lines had installed SeaKeeper 1000, and 14 yacht manufacturers had agreed to include the technology on their boats/ships.

=== BP oil spill ===
In response to the Deepwater Horizon oil spill, the Society with the assistance of researchers at the University of South Florida and environmental sensor company YSI were able to attach and interface a hydrocarbon sensor to the SeaKeeper 1000 environmental monitor in June 2010.

== Partnerships ==
On March 26, 2010 SeaKeepers formed an alliance with Yachts International Magazine to expand the Society's mission and to expand science-based understanding and analysis of global climate change.

In 2012, SeaKeepers partnered with the Volvo Ocean Race.
