= Larry Gould (bridge) =

American bridge player

Larry Gould is an American bridge player.

== Bridge accomplishments ==
=== Wins ===
- North American Bridge Championships (1)
  - Spingold (1) 1974

=== Runners-up ===
- North American Bridge Championships (3)
  - Grand National Teams (1) 1983
  - Mitchell Board-a-Match Teams (1) 1973
  - Spingold (1) 1977
