= Fishbein Trophy =

Trophy awarded by the American Contract Bridge League

The Fishbein Trophy is awarded to the player who wins the greatest number of masterpoints at the summer American Contract Bridge League (ACBL) North American Bridge Championship (NABC).

== History ==
The Fishbein Trophy was donated by the ACBL in memory of Sally Fishbein and in recognition of the untiring efforts of Harry Fishbein, who served as ACBL Treasurer and refused to accept the customary compensation.

== Winners ==
Boldface numerals represent a record-breaking number of masterpoints.

Fishbein Trophy
Year	Winner	Masterpoints
1952	John Crawford	n/a
1953	Milton Ellenby	n/a
1954	David Carter	n/a
1955	Paul Hodge	n/a
1956	Tobias Stone	n/a
1957	John Crawford	n/a
1958	Helen Sobel	n/a
1959	Ira Rubin	n/a
1960	Boris Koytchou	n/a
1961	Marshall Miles	n/a
1962	Ira Rubin	n/a
1963	Al Roth	n/a
1964	Percy Sheardown	**223**
1965	Al Roth	210
1966	Al Roth	186
1967	Phil Feldesman	177
1968	Jim Jacoby	205
1969	Bob Hamman	180
1970	Dave Strasberg	155
1971	Barbara Rappaport	187
1972	B. Jay Becker	179
1973	Richard H. Katz	199
1974	Richard Shepherd	162
1975	Grant Baze	176
1976	Richard H. Katz	219
1977	Ken Cohen	198
1978	Mike Passell	215
1979	Bobby Wolff	179
1980	Peter Weichsel	194
1981	Ralph Katz	**236**
1982	Mike Smolen	221
1983	Bob Hamman	**279.60**
1984	Steve Sion	271
1985	Bill Passell	225
1986	Mark Lair	187
1987	Danny Rotman	188
1988	Helen Utegaard	168
1989	Zeke Jabbour	198
1990	Ron Rubin, Mike Becker	227
1991	Eric Rodwell	278
1992	Juanita Chambers	182
1993	John Sutherlin	233
1994	Lynn Deas	238
1995	Nick Nickell, Richard Freeman	253
1996	Jeff Meckstroth	269
1997	Steve Garner	247
1998	Paul Soloway	**280.77**
1999	Eric Rodwell	**347.87**
2000	Rose Meltzer, Kyle Larsen, Chip Martel, Lew Stansby, Peter Weichsel	315.00
2001	Ralph Katz	**383.85**
2002	Tobi Sokolow	304.43
2003	Michael Rosenberg	**392.50**
2004	Jeff Meckstroth, Eric Rodwell	350.00
2005	Geoff Hampson	348.09
2006	Björn Fallenius	365.00
2007	Jeff Meckstroth, Eric Rodwell	385.72
2008	Migry Zur Campanile	269.56
2009	John Hurd	335.00
2010	Eric Greco, Brad Moss	301.82
2011	David Berkowitz	332.50
2012	Alan Sontag	315.00
2013	Mark Itabashi	326.7
2014	Boye Brogeland, Espen Lindqvist, Lotan Fisher, Ron Schwartz	316.34
2015	Lorenzo Lauria, Alfredo Versace	303.43
2016	Chris Compton, Mike Passell	373.16
2017	Boye Brogeland, Espen Lindqvist	392.50
2018	David Berkowitz	300.00
2019	Jacek Pszczoła	331.43
2020	no winner (due to COVID-19)	

== See also ==
- Mott-Smith Trophy
- Goren Trophy

== Sources ==
- List of previous winners, Page 6. Daily Bulletin (PDF), vol. 79–9, July 28, 2007
- 2007 winners, Page 1. Daily Bulletin (PDF), vol. 80–11, July 30, 2007
- 2008 winner, Page 1. Daily Bulletin (PDF), vol. 80–11, July 28, 2008, archived from the original (PDF) on April 11, 2014
- List of Previous winners, page 4 Daily Bulletin (PDF), vol. 90–10, August 5, 2017
