= Aerotropolis Atlanta =

Planned mixed-use development in Hapeville, Georgia, U.S.

Coordinates: 33°39′2.78″N 84°24′6.60″W

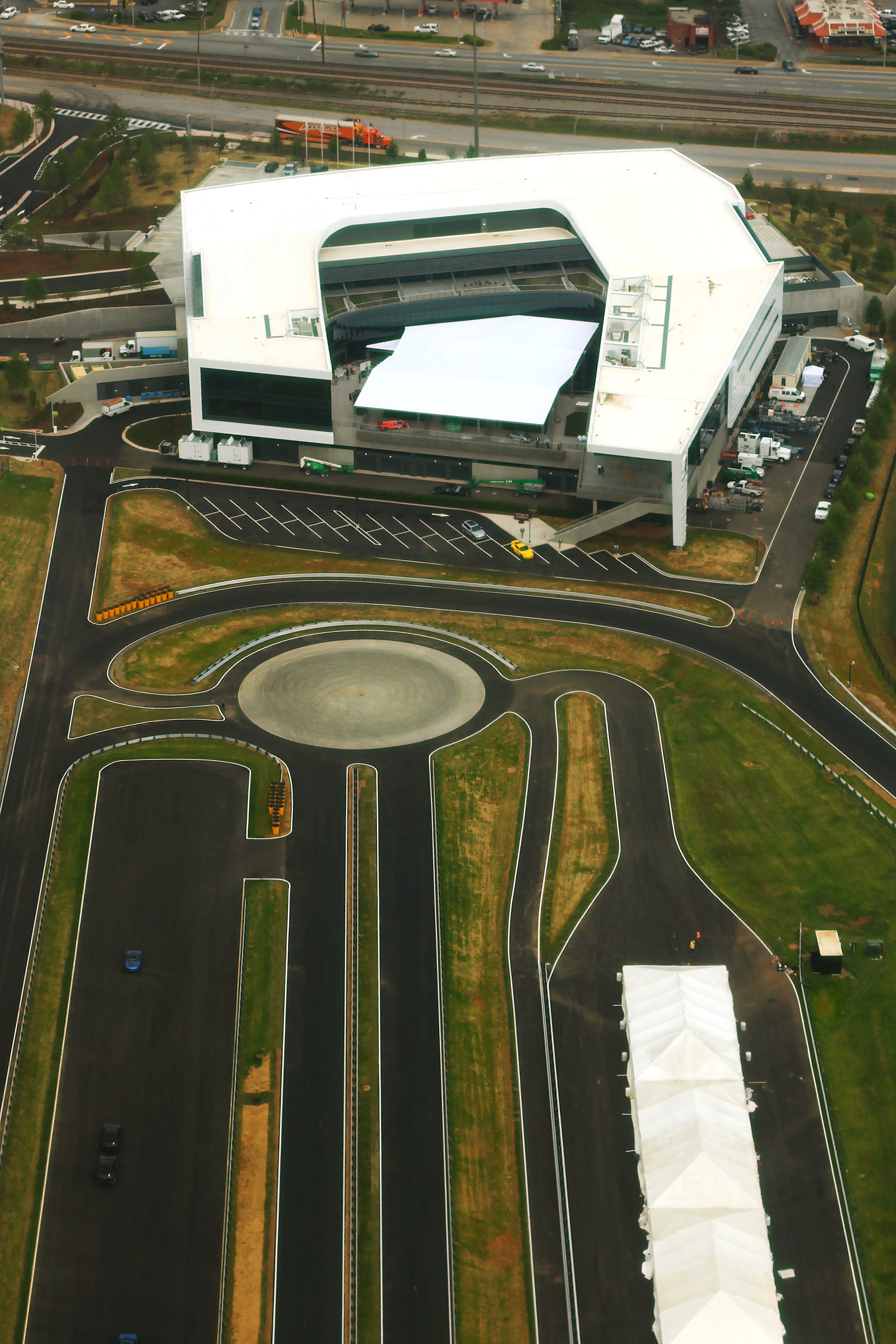
- Aerial view of the Porsche Center, 2014
- Headquarters: Atlanta, Georgia, United States
- Key people: Shannon James, President & CEO; Brian Dorelus, Senior Project Manager; Chante Foster, Marketing & Communications Manager; Valencia White, Executive Assistant
- Website: Aeroatl.org

Aerotropolis Atlanta is a planned mixed-use development in Hapeville, Georgia on the site of the former Ford Atlanta Assembly Plant. The site is directly adjacent to Hartsfield-Jackson Atlanta International Airport. The complex is to house offices, retail, and entertainment.

The plant was purchased for over $40 million by Jacoby Development, Inc. in June 2008. Demolition of the plant began in August 2008 and was expected to take one year.

In May 2011 Porsche North America announced plans to spend $80-100 million to move its North American headquarters from Sandy Springs to Aerotropolis Atlanta, including a new office building and test track. Porsche will receive about $15 million in economic incentives to do so including a $10 million tax break as Aerotropolis is in an "enterprise zone". In August 2012, Porsche building permit filings with the City of Atlanta revealed more details of the project's ambitious scope and cost.

== Initiatives ==
In addition to the redevelopment in the area, AeroATL is also reinvesting in the community, by focusing on economic, community, and logistical development, with the goal of helping the area prosper.

== 2024 Leadership Structure ==
There is an executive committee, made up of prominent community members and investors, as well as a Board of Directors

Executive committee:

- Michelle Arrington, Chair, Verizon
- Kent Mason, Vice Chair, Prologis
- Axel Adams, Treasurer, Delta Air Lines
- Nichole Miles-Sullivan, Atlanta Gas Light
- Alan Peterson, Invest Atlanta
- Mike Alexander, Atlanta Regional Commission
- Dr. Harrison Braddy, Invest Clayton
- George Feygin, Porsche North America
- Honorable Dr. Alieka Anderson-Henry, Clayton County Board of Commissioners
- Gerald McDowell, ATL Airport CIDs
- Honorable Tom Reed, City of Chattahoochee Hills
- Katrina Julien, Community Foundation for Greater Atlanta
- Carol Waddy, Chick-fil-A
- Stephen Vault, WellStar

Board of Directors:

- Marty Turpeau, Development Authority of Fulton County
- Ricky Clark, City of Forest Park
- Dr. Anthony Smith, Clayton County Public Schools
- Stacy Blakley, The ATL Airport Chamber
- Honorable Teresa Thomas-Smith, City of Palmetto
- Honorable Bianca Motley Broom, City of College Park
- Christopher Benjamin, Truist
- Honorable Mario Aver, City of Fairburn
- Honorable Marci Fluellyn, City of LoveJoy
- Dr. Georj Lewis, President of Clayton State University, Clayton County Chamber
- Honorable Mayor Donya Sartor, City of Jonesboro
- Chris Leighty, City of Lake City
- Cedric Matheny, T. Dallas Smith & Company
- Honorable Artie Jones, City of South Fulton
- Honorable Alan Hallman, City of Hapeville
- Gregg Simon, Metro Atlanta Chamber
- Honorable Deana Holiday Ingraham, City of East Point
- Lisa Walker Holloway, Comcast
- Honorable Robb Pitts, Fulton County Board of Commissioners
- Michelle Taylor-Willis, South Fulton Chamber
- Randy Weisburd, Atlantic Pacific Companies
- Dr. Tamara Candis, Fulton County Public Schools
- Honorable Vince Williams, City of Union City
- Honorable Evelyn Wynn-Dixon, City of Riverdale

== Investors ==
AeroATL has taken on several large investors for the project the likes of Delta, Chick-fil-A, Porsche, Georgia Power, and more.
