= Von Zedtwitz Life Master Pairs =

American national bridge championship

The Von Zedtwitz Life Master Pairs national bridge championship is held at the summer American Contract Bridge League (ACBL) North American Bridge Championship (NABC).

Usually called simply the "Life Master Pairs" or "LM Pairs", this is a six-session pairs tournament open to all players without regard to age, sex, nationality, or membership. It is restricted to Life Masters, now a modest career record in ACBL sanctioned play, which leading players from overseas are able to achieve by attending a few NABC meets. If it remains the most prestigious competition for pairs, that may be because it is older than the parallel spring and fall events, the Norman Kay Platinum Pairs established 2010 and Edgar Kaplan Blue Ribbon Pairs established 1963.

== History ==
The Life Master Pairs is a six-session event with two qualifying, two semi-final and two final sessions. It is restricted to Life Masters. At stake is the Von Zedtwitz Gold Cup. In 1930, Waldemar von Zedtwitz donated the Gold Cup, which was presented to the winners of the Life Master Pairs. The first winners: Von Zedtwitz and P. Hal Sims.

The trophy was initially contested by master players who had qualified by winning a national championship. It was a four-session event, and the field was limited to 64 players so that a complete movement could be played.

The trophy was originally presented on the basis that three wins by one player would secure him outright possession of the trophy. This feat was achieved by Howard Schenken in 1934. Schenken won in 1931 and 1933 with David Burnstine and 1934 with Richard L. Frey. He also won in 1941 with Merwyn Maier and in 1943 with John R. Crawford. The cup, put back into competition by the donor, was stolen in 1954 while in the possession of John Hubbell, who held the LM Pairs title. The theft followed a television appearance during which Hubbell had exhibited the trophy and given the address of his bridge club where the cup was normally displayed.

The trophy was never recovered and the present cup is an exact replica. Mary Jane Farell and Marilyn Johnson are the only pair of women to win the event. Their victory came in 1978.

The record score for the event belongs to S. Garton Churchill and Cecil Head, who won in 1948—scoring 65% as an average for four sessions and 77.4% in a single session.

== Winners ==
The first seven champion "Master Pairs", from 1930 to 1936, and also the 1931 to 1933 runners-up, each comprised two of the nine men named Life Masters #1 to #9 by the American Bridge League when it introduced the title in 1936.

Only one pair has defended its title successfully, the 1971 and 1972 winners Al Roth and Barbara Rappaport.

Von Zedtwitz Gold Cup, 1930 to present
Year	Winners	Runners-up
1930	P. Hal Sims, Waldemar von Zedtwitz	Ely Culbertson, Josephine Culbertson
1931	David Burnstine, Howard Schenken	Michael T. Gottlieb, Theodore Lightner
1932	Michael T. Gottlieb, Theodore Lightner	David Burnstine, Howard Schenken
1933	David Burnstine, Howard Schenken	P. Hal Sims, Waldemar von Zedtwitz
1934	Richard L. Frey, Howard Schenken	Walter Malowan, Sydney Rusinow
1935	B. Jay Becker, Theodore Lightner	Louis Haddad, Charles Hall
1936	David Burnstine, Oswald Jacoby	Robert Appleyard, Isadore Epstine
1937	S. Garton Churchill, Charles Lochridge	Doris Fuller, Henry Vogel
1938	Morrie Elis, Sherman Stearns	John R. Crawford, Charles Solomon
1939	Robert Appleyard, Harry Fishbein	Oswald Jacoby, Waldemar von Zedtwitz
1940	Harry Fishbein, Morrie Elis	Sam Fry, Myron Fuchs
1941	Merwyn Maier, Howard Schenken	John R. Crawford, Oswald Jacoby
1942	Charles Goren, Helen Sobel	Philip Abramsohn, Tobias Stone
1943	John R. Crawford, Howard Schenken	Sidney Silodor, Margaret Wagar
1944	Samuel Katz, Peter Leventritt	Ambrose Casner, Ralph Hirschberg
1945	Robert Appleyard, M. A. Lightman	Bertram Lebhar Jr., Simon Rossant
1946	Sidney Silodor, Charles Solomon	Lee Hazen, Ruth Sherman
1947	Allen Harvey, Frank Weisbach	John R. Crawford, Theodore Lightner
1948	S. Garton Churchill, Cecil Head	Erik Coon, Vincent Remey
1949	Ruth Gilbert, Leo Roet	Arthur Glatt, Albert Weiss
1950	Manuel Sherwin, C. W. Yorke	Edward Marcus, Sam Stayman
1951	Richard Kahn, Peter Leventritt	Ned Drucker, Edgar Kaplan
1952	William Jackson, William Joseph	2/3. John R. Crawford, Howard Schenken; 2/3. Arthur Glatt, Albert Weiss
1953	Milton Ellenby, William Rosen	Charles Goren, Helen Sobel
1954	David Carter, John Hubbell	Victor Mitchell, Ira Rubin
1955	Ben Fain, Paul Hodge	Victor Mitchell, Ira Rubin
1956	Al Roth, Tobias Stone	John R. Crawford, Sidney Silodor
1957	H. Sanborn Brown, Martin Cohn	Francis Begley, Louis Kelner
1958	1/2. Charles Goren, Helen Sobel; 1/2. Wilson Landley, Louis Levy	
1959	Ed Rosen, Dan Rotman	Sidney Aronson, Larry Weiss
1960	Helen Portugal, Morris Portugal	Curtis Smith, Bobby Wolff
1961	Phil Feldesman, Marshall Miles	Paul Kibler, Robert Reynolds
1962	Phil Feldesman, Ira Rubin	Edith Kemp, Albert Weiss
1963	Lew Mathe, Edward Taylor	Ira Rubin, Curtis Smith
1964	B. Jay Becker, Dorothy Hayden	Bruce Elliott, Percy Sheardown
1965	Victor Mitchell, Sam Stayman	Al Roth, Tobias Stone
1966	Hermine Baron, Meyer Schleifer	Morrie Freier, Robert Reynolds
1967	Phil Feldesman, Lew Mathe	Diana Schuld, Frank Schuld
1968	Billy Eisenberg, Bobby Goldman	Jim Jacoby, Bobby Wolff
1969	Sami Kehela, Eric Murray	Chuck Burger, Jimmy Cayne
1970	Paul Heitner, Michael Moss	Robert Freedman, James Mathis
1971	Al Roth, Barbara Rappaport	Jim Jacoby, Minda Brachman
1972	Al Roth, Barbara Rappaport	Alan Sontag, Peter Weichsel
1973	Jack Blair, Paul Swanson	Chuck Burger, Jimmy Cayne
1974	Gerald Michaud, Bobby Nail	Walter Walvick, Thomas Weik
1975	Roy Fox, Eugene O'Neill	Mike Becker, Ahmed Hussein
1976	Bobby Lipsitz, Neil Silverman	Garey Hayden, Mike Passell
1977	Alan Sontag, Peter Weichsel	Ken Cohen, Bobby Lipsitz
1978	Mary Jane Farell, Marilyn Johnson	Ron Feldman, David Sacks
1979	Ralph Katz, Ken Schutze	Dan Morse, Bobby Nail
1980	Bob Hamman, Eric Rodwell	Don Caton, Homer Shoop
1981	Fred Stewart, Steve Weinstein	Paul Lavings, Bob Richman
1982	Ron Andersen, Tommy Sanders	Bobby Lipsitz, Ron Sukoneck
1983	Bob Hamman, Eddie Kantar	Jeff Meckstroth, Eric Rodwell
1984	Mike Lawrence, Peter Weichsel	Steve Sion, Alan Sontag
1985	George Steiner, Darryl Pedersen	David Siebert, Allan Siebert
1986	Douglas Simson, Eric Rodwell	Tom Kniest, Karen Walker
1987	David Berkowitz, Larry N. Cohen	Peter Boyd, Steve Robinson
1988	Marty Bergen, Larry N. Cohen	John Carruthers, Howard Weinstein
1989	Richard Katz, Bobby Levin	Howard Weinstein, Ralph Katz
1990	Mike Becker, Ron Rubin	John Mohan, Kay Schulle
1991	Doug Simson, Eric Rodwell	Steve Sion, Clint Morrell
1992	Bob Hamman, Hemant Lall	Zia Mahmood, Hugh Ross
1993	Dan Morse, John Sutherlin	Tom Clarke, Alan Lebendig
1994	Bobby Levin, Jeff Wolfson	Steve Sion, Eddie Wold
1995	Joe Kivel, Allan Siebert	Bill Root, Richard Pavlicek
1996	David Berkowitz, Larry N. Cohen	Tony Forrester, Geir Helgemo
1997	Steve Garner, Howard Weinstein	Tony Forrester, Geir Helgemo
1998	Eric Greco, Geoff Hampson	Richard Pavlicek, Rich Pavlicek Jr.
1999	John Mohan, Sam Lev	Brad Moss, Fred Gitelman
2000	Zia Mahmood, Michael Rosenberg	John Mohan, Sam Lev
2001	Bobby Levin, Steve Weinstein	Gary Cohler, Ralph Katz
2002	Tobi Sokolow, Leni Holtz	Lynn Deas, Curtis Cheek
2003	Nick Nickell, Richard Freeman	Michael Rosenberg, Ralph Katz
2004	Waleed El Ahmady, Zia Mahmood	Reese Milner, John Mohan
2005	Stephen Gladyszak, Pat McDevitt	Waleed El Ahmady, Zia Mahmood
2006	Bart Bramley, Björn Fallenius	Marty Fleisher, William Pollack
2007	Zia Mahmood, Chip Martel	Renee Mancuso, Howard Weinstein
2008	Jan Jansma, Ricco van Prooijen	Eric Greco, Geoff Hampson
2009	Michał Kwiecień, Roald Ramer	Nikolay Demirev, Hemant Lall
2010	Boye Brogeland, Erik Sælensminde	Norberto Bocchi, Guido Ferraro
2011	Per-Ola Cullin, Peter Bertheau	Zia Mahmood, Tarek Sadek
2012	Alan Sontag, Alan Osofsky	Zia Mahmood, Marty Fleisher
2013	Mark Itabashi, Ross Grabel	Kevin Bathurst, Steve Weinstein
2014	Doug Doub, Frank Merblum	Giorgio Duboin, Zia Mahmood
2015	Jean Quantin, Cedric Lorenzini	Zia Mahmood, Giorgio Duboin
2016	Mike Passell, Chris Compton	Ralph Katz, Steve Garner
2017	Joel Wooldridge, John Hurd	Espen Lindqvist, Boye Brogeland
2018	Michael Roche, John Carruthers	Peter Bertheau, Frederic Wrang
2019	Vincent Demuy, Brad Moss	Gary Soules, Edward Nagy
2020	Cancelled (COVID-19)	Cancelled (COVID-19)
2021	Cancelled (COVID-19)	Cancelled (COVID-19)
2022	Nick Nickell, Ralph Katz	Steve Weinstein, Eric Greco
2023	Zia Mahmood, Ola Rimstedt	Agustin Madala, Alon Birman
2024	Ami Zamir, Oren Toledano	Jerome Rombaut, Leo Rombaut
2025	Owen Lien, Harrison Luba	Christian Bakke, Mikael Rimstedt

== See also ==
- Edgar Kaplan Blue Ribbon Pairs, or Blue Ribbon Pairs
- Norman Kay Platinum Pairs, or Platinum Pairs
