= Knockout squeeze =

Bridge (card game) tactic

In bridge, a knockout squeeze is a squeeze in three suits, one of which is the trump suit. The defender's trump holding is needed to prevent declarer from making a successful play involving trumps, including one as prosaic as ruffing a loser. Because the knockout squeeze does not threaten to promote declarer's trumps to winners (they are often already of winning rank) it is termed a non-material squeeze. Other non-material squeezes include entry squeezes, single-suit squeezes and winkles.

== Example 1 ==
		♠♤	10		
		♥	7		
		♦	10 4		
		♣♧	6		
♠♤	4	N W E S		♠♤	8
♥	J	N W E S		♥	—
♦	8 5 2	N W E S		♦	K Q
♣♧	—	N W E S		♣♧	J 8
North on lead		♠♤	J 9		
North on lead		♥	—		
North on lead		♦	7		
North on lead		♣♧	7 5		

In a spade contract, declarer needs three of the last five tricks. He can't play for a crossruff because East will get the lead in a minor suit and lead his ♠8. Declarer leads dummy's ♥7 and East's hand collapses.

- If East discards a diamond, South ruffs with the ♠J and leads a diamond, to win two spades and a diamond.
- If East discards a club on the ♥7, South ruffs with the ♠9 and leads a club, to win two spades and a club.
- And if East discards his trump, South can overruff with either the ♠J or the ♠9 and play a minor suit, eventually making his two remaining trumps separately.

The salient point in the diagram position is that because East holds a trump, South can't just duck a minor suit trick to set up a crossruff. If he does, East will win and lead his trump, killing the crossruff. East does not threaten to take a trump trick, just to lead his trump and stop dummy's ruff.

But if East gives up his guard in either minor, he gives South an additional trick in the side suit, and now South no longer needs the ruff.

Notice the entry-shifting mechanism in the trump suit. South chooses the card to ruff with depending on East's discard. If East discards a diamond on the ♥7, South ruffs high so that he can later win a trump trick with the ♠10. If East discards a club on the ♥7, South ruffs low so that he can later win the ♠J.

== Example 2 ==
		♠♤	Q 2		
		♥	7		
		♦	4		
		♣♧	8		
♠♤	5	N W E S		♠♤	A 6
♥	—	N W E S		♥	J
♦	9 6 5	N W E S		♦	A K
♣♧	10	N W E S		♣♧	—
		♠♤	K J 8		
		♥	—		
		♦	10 7		
		♣♧	—		

A positional squeeze can entail an entry-shift, and in fact the squeeze given above is positional — it will not operate if the East-West hands are switched. But many knockout squeezes are not positional but automatic — that is, the threats are located such that the squeeze operates against either opponent. Here is an example:

With spades trump, North has the lead. South needs three of the last five tricks. He leads dummy's club to knockout-squeeze East. If East discards a trump, South will be able to take two trumps in his hand and ruff a diamond in dummy. If East discards anything else, South ruffs low and leads a diamond, to win two trumps and a red suit trick, or two trumps and a diamond ruff, depending on how East defends.

		♠♤	Q 2		
		♥	7		
		♦	4		
		♣♧	8		
♠♤	A 6	N W E S		♠♤	5
♥	J	N W E S		♥	—
♦	A K	N W E S		♦	9 6 5
♣♧	—	N W E S		♣♧	10
		♠♤	K J 8		
		♥	—		
		♦	10 7		
		♣♧	—		

The ruff of the ♣8 in South's hand still operates a squeeze if the East-West hands are switched, so the position is an automatic squeeze:

South ruffs the ♣8 with the ♠8, and West is backwash-squeezed. The threats are the same as in the prior case, where East is squeezed. But the position is characteristic of a backwash squeeze: West is squeezed in three suits; one of the threats is against West's ability to lead trump effectively; there is no structural two-card menace consisting of an entry and a threat card; West is squeezed as South ruffs a card in the fourth suit.

== Example 3 ==
		♠♤	Q J 8		
		♥	8 5 4 3		
		♦	6 3 2		
		♣♧	A 8 4		
♠♤	6 2	N W E S		♠♤	7 5 4
♥	9 7 2	N W E S		♥	K J 10 6
♦	Q 9	N W E S		♦	A K J 10
♣♧	Q 10 9 7 5 2	N W E S		♣♧	J 3
		♠♤	A K 10 9 3		
		♥	A Q		
		♦	8 7 5 4		
		♣♧	K 6		

Discussing the relationship between backwash and knockout squeezes, Ottlik and Kelsey state, "The KO [knockout] squeeze is, in fact, the general form of the strategic squeeze against 'idle' trump cards, of which the backwash . . . is a particular case."

The backwash and the knockout squeezes can be distinguished by whether the squeezed defender must play before or after third hand ruffs: in the knockout squeeze, the squeezed defender plays prior to the ruff; in the backwash squeeze, after. The following example is from Ottlik and Kelsey:

Against 4♠, West leads a small trump. The defense is now a tempo ahead, if South plays to ruff a diamond in dummy. Seeing this, South wins dummy's ♠8, takes the heart finesse, and cashes the ♣K, the ♣A, and then ruffs the ♣8 with the ♠K in this position:

		♠♤	Q J		
		♥	8 5 4		
		♦	6 3 2		
		♣♧	8		
♠♤	6	N W E S		♠♤	7 5
♥	9 7	N W E S		♥	K J 10
♦	Q 9	N W E S		♦	A K J 10
♣♧	Q 10 7 2	N W E S		♣♧	—
		♠♤	A K 10 9		
		♥	A		
		♦	8 7 5 4		
		♣♧	—		

East is knockout-squeezed. On the ♣8:

- A heart discard allows South to ruff out the suit, using the ♠QJ as entries, first to ruff the ♥4 and then to cash the ♥5.
- A spade discard means that the defense cannot lead two more rounds of trumps, and South can ruff a diamond in dummy after all.
- A diamond discard just delays the dénouement. South plays on diamonds after ruffing the ♣8, and depending on East's subsequent defense South can either ruff a diamond in dummy or establish his ♦8.

		♠♤	Q J 8		
		♥	8 5 4 3		
		♦	6 3 2		
		♣♧	A 8 4		
♠♤	7 5 4	N W E S		♠♤	6 2
♥	J 10 9 6	N W E S		♥	K 7 2
♦	A K J 10	N W E S		♦	Q 9
♣♧	J 3	N W E S		♣♧	Q 10 9 7 5 2
		♠♤	A K 10 9 3		
		♥	A Q		
		♦	8 7 5 4		
		♣♧	K 6		

But suppose that the East-West hands are switched, except that East retains the ♥K (the successful heart finesse plays no role in the squeeze itself):

South plays as before, winning the trump opening lead in dummy, taking the heart finesse, and then playing on clubs, to reach this position before leading the third club:

		♠♤	Q J		
		♥	8 5 4		
		♦	6 3 2		
		♣♧	8		
♠♤	7 5	N W E S		♠♤	6
♥	J 10 9	N W E S		♥	K 7
♦	A K J 10	N W E S		♦	Q 9
♣♧	—	N W E S		♣♧	Q 10 7 2
		♠♤	A K 10 9		
		♥	A		
		♦	8 7 5 4		
		♣♧	—		

South ruffs the third round of clubs with the ♠K and West is backwash-squeezed. The defense has the same losing options as it does when East is knockout-squeezed. Regardless of the terminology, this matrix of threats results in an automatic squeeze.
