= List of play techniques (bridge) =

== Techniques by declarer ==
- trumping or ruffing and crossruffing
- establishing a long suit
- finessing
- ducking
- blocking and unblocking
- managing entries
- maintaining tempo
- drawing trumps
- not drawing trumps

== Advanced techniques by declarer ==
- card reading, also known as counting the hand
- dummy reversal
- endplay
- coups
- squeezes
- suit combinations play
- safety play
- applying the principle of restricted choice
- applying the theory of vacant places
- applying percentages and probabilities

== Techniques by defenders ==
- making the opening lead
- signaling
- unblocking
- overtaking
- holding up.
