= Squeeze play (bridge) =

Contract bridge technique

A squeeze play (or squeeze) is a technique used in contract bridge and other trick-taking games in which the play of a card (the squeeze card) forces an opponent to discard a winner or the guard of a potential winner. The situation typically occurs in the end game, with only a few cards remaining. Although numerous types of squeezes have been analyzed and catalogued in contract bridge, they were first discovered and described in whist.

Most squeezes operate on the principle that declarer's and dummy's hands can, between them, hold more cards with the potential to take extra tricks than a single defender's hand can protect or guard. Infrequently, due to the difficulty of coordinating their holdings, two defenders can cooperate to squeeze declarer or dummy on the same principle.

== Context ==
=== Complexity ===
Squeeze plays are considered by many "to be the domain of the experts but many of the positions are straightforward once the basic principles are understood." And according to Terence Reese, the squeeze play "in its practical aspects is not particularly difficult. It takes time, admittedly...and has...to be learned – it cannot be 'picked up'".

=== Significance and prevalence ===
Squeeze plays are important in difficult-to-make high-level contracts and in matchpoint play where the taking of one more trick than generally achieved by the field is a real difference-maker likely to result in a top board. The opportunity to employ a squeeze play arises sufficiently frequently that it is essential to learn if one aspires to become an advanced player.^{,}

=== Terminology ===
- Busy cards: Cards held by defenders which are winners or protecting winners.
- Card reading: Determining or assuming the location of the opponents' cards.
- The count: The number of tricks that must be lost before the squeeze can function.
- Rectify the count: To lose the necessary number of tricks.
- Entry: A high card or trump that enables declarer to place the lead in the hand that holds, or that will hold, another card that the squeeze has established.
- Idle cards: Cards that can safely be discarded by defenders (i.e., are not busy). Rectifying the count removes idle cards from the defenders' hands.
- Menace or threat cards: Cards held by declarer or dummy which start out as losers, but which may be promoted to winning rank when the squeeze forces the defense to discard its stoppers.
- Squeeze card: The card which (when led) forces the defense to discard a busy card or cards. Before the squeeze card can bring the squeeze about, several conditions described below must be met.

== Conditions ==
The most basic forms of squeeze require all the following conditions to be in place before the squeeze can operate:

- The defense's guards in the threat suits must be held by one defender only.
- The count has been rectified which ensures that:
  - Declarer has enough winners to take all the remaining tricks but one, which is to be gained from the squeeze; and
  - The defender being squeezed has no idle cards.
- Between them, declarer and dummy have threat cards in two suits that the squeeze may establish as winners:
  - At least one of the threat cards must be in the hand opposite the squeeze card; and
  - At least one of the threat cards must lie in the hand that plays after the squeezed defender.
- There is an entry to the threat card opposite the squeeze card.

== Examples ==
Example 1		♠♤	A J		
Example 1		♥	K		
Example 1		♦	—		
Example 1		♣♧	—		
♠♤	K Q	N W E S		♠♤	
♥	A	N W E S		♥	Q J 10
♦	—	N W E S		♦	
♣♧	—	N W E S		♣♧	—
South to lead		♠♤	4		
South to lead		♥	2		
South to lead		♦	—		
South to lead		♣♧	A		

Example 2		♠♤	A J		
Example 2		♥	K		
Example 2		♦	—		
Example 2		♣♧	—		
♠♤		N W E S		♠♤	K Q
♥	Q J 10	N W E S		♥	A
♦		N W E S		♦	—
♣♧	—	N W E S		♣♧	—
South to lead		♠♤	4		
South to lead		♥	2		
South to lead		♦	—		
South to lead		♣♧	A		

South needs all three remaining tricks in a notrump contract. South leads the squeeze card, the ♣A, and West is squeezed in hearts and spades. If West discards the ♥A, North's ♥K becomes a winner. If West discards either spade, North's ♠J becomes a winner.

Note the following features of this position:

1. One defender, West, holds the defense's only guards in declarer's two threat suits, spades and hearts.
2. The count is rectified. Three cards remain, and declarer has two immediate winners (the ♣A and ♠A). Another winner will be established by the squeeze (either the ♥K or the ♠J).
3. The ♥K and the ♠J are the threat cards. At least one threat card (in this case, both the ♥K and the ♠J) lies opposite the squeeze card (the ♣A).
4. At least one threat card (in this case, both the ♥K and the ♠J) is in the hand that plays after the squeezed defender.
5. The ♠A is an entry to either threat card.

This is an example of a positional squeeze, because both threat cards are in the same hand, North's. No threat card lies over East and therefore the squeeze can take effect only if West is to be squeezed.

If West's cards are transferred to East, as shown in Example 2, the squeeze fails because the fourth condition above is not satisfied. In that case, one of the menaces must be discarded before it is East's turn to play. If the ♥K is discarded, East can safely discard the ♥A. If the ♠J is discarded, East can safely discard a spade.

=== Progressive squeeze ===
The progressive squeeze (also termed a "repeating squeeze") is a contract bridge squeeze that gains two tricks by squeezing one and the same player twice, hence the name. A progressive squeezes is a subset of triple squeezes that, depending both on entries and on positional factors, may result in a subsequent, simple, two-suit squeeze that takes place against the opponent who has just been triple squeezed. Confusing the issue is that some triple squeezes can become progressive squeezes through misdefense. The first diagram shows a basic example:

♠♤	A J 10		
♥	—		
♦	—		
♣♧	6		
N E S		♠♤	K Q
N E S		♥	A
N E S		♦	A
N E S		♣♧	—
♠♤	3		
♥	K		
♦	K		
♣♧	A		

When the ace of clubs is cashed East is squeezed and has to discard one of his red aces, the established king is cashed (this is the progressive squeeze card) and East is squeezed for another trick.

In the above example an extended menace, threatening the immediate loss of two tricks was present. That is not always necessary, a progressive squeeze still works if we have an additional entry as compensation.

♠♤	A J		
♥	3 2		
♦	—		
♣♧	6		
N E S		♠♤	K Q
N E S		♥	K Q
N E S		♦	A
N E S		♣♧	—
♠♤	2		
♥	A J		
♦	K		
♣♧	A		

When the ace of clubs is cashed East can either discard the diamond ace, after which the diamond king will seal his fate, or bare one of his major suit holdings in which case the jack in that suit will be the progressive squeeze card. Had West East's cards the best defense to discard a spade will break the second squeeze.

== Classification ==
There are several ways to classify squeezes:

- According to which opponent can be squeezed:
  - In a positional squeeze, only one opponent can be squeezed.
  - In an automatic squeeze, either opponent can be squeezed.
- According to number of opponents squeezed:
  - In a single squeeze, only one opponent is squeezed.
  - In a double squeeze, both opponents are squeezed.
- According to number of suits involved:
  - In a two-suit squeeze, there are menaces in two suits.
  - In a three-suit squeeze, there are menaces in three suits.
  - In a compound squeeze, there are menaces in three suits (against one); then, menaces in three suits (against both opponents). It could be named a six-suit squeeze.
  - The peculiar and rare single-suit squeeze is actually a type of endplay rather than a real squeeze.
- According to what is gained:
  - In a material squeeze, the opponents are forced to give up a trick directly.
  - In a non-material squeeze, the opponents are forced to give up strategic position. For example, an opponent can be squeezed out of an exit card or a card that disturbs declarer's entries. An extra trick, however, may materialize later.
- According to the count rectification:
  - In a squeeze with the count, the count is rectified before the squeeze card is played, and declarer will lose no more tricks. These are typically material squeezes.
  - In a squeeze without the count, the count is not yet rectified. These are typically non-material squeezes, often with a throw-in in the end position.

Most of the common types of squeezes (and some of the rare ones) have names:

Type of Squeeze	Positional or Automatic	Opponents	Suits	Material or Non-material	Count Rectified
Simple squeeze	Either	Single	2	Yes	Yes
Criss-cross squeeze	Automatic	Single	2	Yes	Yes
Trump squeeze	Either	Single	2	Yes	Yes
Progressive squeeze (a.k.a. Triple squeeze)	Positional	Single	3	Yes	Yes
Double squeeze (also: Simultaneous double squeeze Non-simultaneous double squeeze)	Either	Double	3	Yes	Yes
Compound squeeze	Positional	Double	3	Yes	Yes
Entry-shifting squeeze	Positional	Single	2	Yes	Yes
Single-suit squeeze	Positional	Single	1	Yes	No
Strip squeeze	Positional	Single	2–3	Yes	No
Backwash squeeze	Positional	Single	2	Yes	Yes
Cannibal squeeze (a.k.a. Suicide squeeze)	Positional	Single	2	Yes	Yes*
Stepping-stone squeeze	Positional	Either	2	No	No
Guard squeeze	Positional	Either	2–3	Yes	Yes
Vice squeeze	Positional	Single	2–3	Yes	No
Winkle squeeze	Positional	Single	3	No	No
Clash squeeze	Positional	Either	3	Yes	Yes
Saturated squeeze	Positional	Double	4	Yes	Yes
Pseudo-squeeze	N/A	N/A	N/A	No	N/A
Entry squeeze	Either	Either	3	No	No
Knockout squeeze	Either	Single	3	No	No

== See also ==
- Bridge Squeezes Complete by Clyde E. Love
- List of play techniques (bridge)
- Vienna coup
