= Vice squeeze =

Advanced squeeze in contract bridge

The Vice is an advanced squeeze in contract bridge. Its distinguishing motive is presence of a "vice" menace in one suit, where one defender holds cards of equivalent rank which split the declarer's pair of cards in front of him, where his partner has a winner in the suit. It was first attested by Terence Reese in the book "The Expert Game", a.k.a. "Master Play in Contract Bridge". In other words, the defenders have a "high" finesse position, equivalent to the one in diagram:

	K10	
QJ	W N↑ S↓ E	Ax
	xx	

If West can be forced to abandon QJ, the defenders will take only one trick in the suit.

A similar motive is encountered in guard squeezes, however, in the vice, the defenders have a winner in the suit. Since that winner will take a trick, this squeeze is without the count.

== Examples ==
		♠♤	—		
		♥	K 10 4		
		♦	—		
		♣♧	—		
♠♤	—	N W E S		♠♤	—
♥	Q J	N W E S		♥	A 9 7
♦	10	N W E S		♦	—
♣♧	—	N W E S		♣♧	—
South to lead		♠♤	5		
South to lead		♥	3		
South to lead		♦	8		
South to lead		♣♧	—		

Hearts are the "vice suit", and the second menace is the declarer's ♦8. This is a position akin to automatic simple squeeze. When South leads the high ♠5, West must not discard the ♦10; when he parts with a heart honor, declarer leads the heart and East must cede the last trick to dummy's heart ten.

		♠♤	—		
		♥	K 10		
		♦	K 5		
		♣♧	—		
♠♤	—	N W E S		♠♤	—
♥	Q J	N W E S		♥	A 9
♦	10 9	N W E S		♦	7 4
♣♧	—	N W E S		♣♧	—
		♠♤	5		
		♥	3		
		♦	8 2		
		♣♧	—		

When the second menace (diamonds) is in dummy, it must be a two-card menace accompanied by an entry, otherwise West can safely abandon the suit; if the ♦K were absent, the West can discard the diamond winner, as the declarer will not have the entry to enjoy it.
