= Strip squeeze =

Declarer technique

A strip squeeze is a declarer technique at contract bridge combining elements of squeeze and endplay.

This squeeze occurs when declarer has two or more losers remaining. By cashing winners, declarer forces the squeezed defender to discard cards so that he cannot defeat the contract. Eventually, the defender will be forced to unguard a potential winner, exposing it to capture or be put on lead and forced to lead a suit that will cost his side a trick.

== Examples ==
Example 1a South in 6♥		♠♤	A 3 2		
Example 1a South in 6♥		♥	A 6 3 2		
Example 1a South in 6♥		♦	4 3 2		
Example 1a South in 6♥		♣♧	4 3 2		
♠♤	K 7 6 5	N W E S		♠♤	J 10 9 8
♥	5 4	N W E S		♥	7
♦	6 5	N W E S		♦	J 10 9 8 7
♣♧	K Q 10 6 5	N W E S		♣♧	9 8 7
Lead: ♣K		♠♤	Q 4		
Lead: ♣K		♥	K Q J 10 9 8		
Lead: ♣K		♦	A K Q		
Lead: ♣K		♣♧	A J		

South is in a 6♥ contract with 11 top tricks on the ♣K lead. To perform a simple squeeze, South would have to lose a trick at some point to rectify the count. This will not work on this hand because the only menaces South has are in clubs and spades. Ducking a trick in clubs would allow East to guard the suit.

South must rely on a strip squeeze to make the hand. The first club trick is won, and the hearts then the diamonds are cashed.

Example 1b		♠♤	A 3		
Example 1b		♥	—		
Example 1b		♦	2		
Example 1b		♣♧	4		
♠♤	K 7	N W E S		♠♤	J
♥	—	N W E S		♥	—
♦	—	N W E S		♦	J 10
♣♧	Q 10	N W E S		♣♧	9
South on lead		♠♤	Q 4		
South on lead		♥	—		
South on lead		♦	K		
South on lead		♣♧	J		

South remains with ♠Q ♠4 ♣J and ♠A ♠3 ♣4 in dummy. West must choose between baring the ♠K or ♣Q. If West keeps ♠K X, South puts West on lead with a club to lead away from the spade. Otherwise, South plays a spade to the Ace to drop West's King.

An experienced West will try to make things as difficult as possible for South so that the correct route to 12 tricks is not certain. Making the key discard before the final winner is cashed will introduce as much ambiguity as possible. Although in double-dummy it is impossible to go wrong, occasionally South will make the wrong decision in competition.

Squeezes often require declarer to know the location of specific high cards or the number of cards a defender holds in a particular suit, in order to know what cards the squeezee will be forced to play. Examples 2a and 2b illustrates:

Example 2a		♠♤	A J		
Example 2a		♥	K		
Example 2a		♦	2		
Example 2a		♣♧	—		
♠♤	K Q	N W E S		♠♤	3 2
♥	A	N W E S		♥	—
♦	7	N W E S		♦	Q
♣♧	—	N W E S		♣♧	8
South to lead		♠♤	4		
South to lead		♥	2		
South to lead		♦	3		
South to lead		♣♧	A		

Example 2b		♠♤	A J		
Example 2b		♥	K		
Example 2b		♦	2		
Example 2b		♣♧	—		
♠♤	K Q	N W E S		♠♤	—
♥	A	N W E S		♥	—
♦	7	N W E S		♦	Q
♣♧	—	N W E S		♣♧	3 2 8
South to lead		♠♤	4		
South to lead		♥	2		
South to lead		♦	3		
South to lead		♣♧	A		

Again South needs three of the remaining tricks in a notrump contract. In Example 2a the presence of the diamond loser means that when South cashes the ♣A, West is not squeezed. He can safely discard his idle ♦7. However, when South next plays the ♦3, West is squeezed again. East wins the ♦Q, but must lead to dummy's winners.

In Example 2b East's ♠3 ♠2 are replaced by the ♣3 ♣2 and declarer must know East's club length in order to make the correct play. If South cashes the ♣A and then leads the ♦3, East wins the ♦Q and will take the rest of the tricks. In this case, the correct play is for South to lose the ♦Q immediately, before taking the ♣A, in order to rectify the count. Now East is forced to lead a club to South's ace, and West is squeezed as before.

But with East's hand as shown in Example 2a, losing the ♦Q first does not work. East can return a spade, and declarer will score only the ♠A. Not only does the squeeze position disappear, but there is no entry to cash the ♣A.

== See also ==
- Bridge Squeezes Complete by Clyde E. Love
- Squeeze play bibliography.
