= Compound squeeze =

Type of play in the game of contract bridge

A compound squeeze is a type of play in the game of contract bridge. In this squeeze, one opponent is squeezed such that some form of other squeeze emerges involving either or both players. Usually this term is used to reference a pentagonal squeeze. In this form of squeeze, both players guard two suits, and one player guards a third suit. On the play of a card the player guarding three suits must give up one of the shared guards (so as not to provide immediate winners). Now each opponent singly guards one suit, and there is a third suit that is jointly guarded. This means that a double squeeze matrix exists. Note that there are pseudo compound squeezes, where the triply squeezed opponent can select the 'correct' shared suit, such that the entry situation precludes the proper functioning of the double squeeze.

Other variations of compound squeezes:

- hexagonal squeeze: where one opponent is triply squeezed, and the resulting matrix is that of a pentagonal squeeze. Both opponents are squeezed in the same three suits.
- saturated squeeze: similar to the hexagonal squeeze, but all four suits are involved, with each opponent singly holding length guards in 2 suits, and then the 2 other suits are shared.

== Example ==
		♠♤	A 4		
		♥	A J 9 2		
		♦	K 8 6 4		
		♣♧	A 7 3		
♠♤	J 2	N W E S		♠♤	10 7
♥	Q 7 6 5 3	N W E S		♥	K 10 8
♦	Q 9 5 3	N W E S		♦	J 10 2
♣♧	10 4	N W E S		♣♧	K Q 8 5 2
		♠♤	K Q 9 8 6 5 3		
		♥	4		
		♦	A 7		
		♣♧	J 9 6		

		♠♤	—		
		♥	A J		
		♦	K 8 6		
		♣♧	7		
♠♤	—	N W E S		♠♤	—
♥	Q 7 6	N W E S		♥	K 10
♦	Q 9 5	N W E S		♦	J 10 2
♣♧	—	N W E S		♣♧	K
		♠♤	5 3		
		♥	4		
		♦	A 7		
		♣♧	J		

South plays in 6♠, East having doubled the bid of 5♣. West leads the ♣10. Despite the potential defensive ruff, the declarer must duck the lead to East's queen in order to rectify the count. East returns a trump (a red card would reduce the situation to other sorts of squeeze ending). The declarer has 7 spade tricks, a heart, a club, and two diamonds. The twelfth trick can be obtained by compound squeeze: assuming only East guards clubs, he will have to ultimately unguard one of red suits on the first squeeze card; that suit will serve as the "common suit" for the latter double squeeze. The declarer draws trumps, cashing the ♣A in the process for a Vienna coup. When declarer leads the sixth trump (♠5), the position as on the right diagram is reached.

West discards a heart, dummy a club, but East now has a problem, as he must discard one of red suits:

- If he discards a diamond, declarer can now cash ♦K and ♦A. On the last spade, a classic double-squeeze position occurs, where both players cannot guard hearts.
- If he discards a heart, declarer can now cash ♥A and ♦A. Again, a double-squeeze is executed, as both players cannot guard diamonds.

The motive is similar to the one in guard squeeze – East is squeezed in three suits and forced to abandon the help to his partner in one of them.
