= Guard squeeze =

Bridge (cards) tactic

A guard squeeze is a type of squeeze in contract bridge where a player is squeezed out of a card which prevents his partner from being finessed. The squeeze operates in three suits, where the squeezed player protects the menaces in two suits, but cannot help his partner anymore in the third suit after the squeeze is executed.

== Example ==
The following example shows a guard squeeze:

		♠	—		
		♥	5		
		♦	Q		
		♣	A 7		
♠	—	N W E S		♠	—
♥	10	N W E S		♥	—
♦	K	N W E S		♦	—
♣	J 6	N W E S		♣	Q 9 8 4
		♠	2		
		♥	—		
		♦	—		
		♣	K 10 5		

South has a simple squeeze against West in hearts and diamonds except that there is no entry in either threat suit. The squeeze operates because West is also busy protecting East against a club finesse. South plays the ♠2 and West must keep all his red cards to protect menaces of ♥5 and ♦Q in the dummy. Thus West must discard a club. Now, the declarer plays a club to the ace and can finesse against East's queen of clubs.

== Double guard squeeze ==
		♠	—		
		♥	K 10		
		♦	Q		
		♣	8		
♠	—	N W E S		♠	—
♥	Q 9	N W E S		♥	J
♦	K	N W E S		♦	A
♣	J	N W E S		♣	Q 9
		♠	2		
		♥	4		
		♦	—		
		♣	K 10		

A double guard squeeze is very rare. Again, in the diagram South leads the spade 2. If West discards ♣J, the position comes down to the one from the previous diagram. So, he must discard the diamond king. The declarer ditches now unnecessary club from the table, and the pressure comes to East—he must not throw the ♦A nor a club, and after the discard of the ♥J the declarer has a free way to finesse West's queen.

== See also ==
- Bridge Squeezes Complete by Clyde E. Love
- Double squeeze
- List of play techniques (bridge)
- Squeeze play (bridge)
