= Winkle squeeze =

Play in the card game of contract bridge

A winkle squeeze is a rare squeeze/endplay in contract bridge in which a trick is offered to the defenders but whichever wins the trick is then endplayed. Often one defender would be forced to offer a finesse or ruff and discard while the other could overtake and thereby promote a trick in that suit for declarer. The winkle squeeze was named and analyzed by Terence Reese in Master Play in Contract Bridge.

An example end-position, South on lead with spades as trumps and needing four tricks:

South in 4♠ Needs 4 tricks		♠♤	—		
South in 4♠ Needs 4 tricks		♥	—		
South in 4♠ Needs 4 tricks		♦	J 6 4		
South in 4♠ Needs 4 tricks		♣♧	A K		
♠♤	—	N W E S		♠♤	—
♥	—	N W E S		♥	10 8
♦	K 10 2	N W E S		♦	Q 8 7
♣♧	Q 2	N W E S		♣♧	—
South on lead		♠♤	2		
South on lead		♥	J 9		
South on lead		♦	A 3		
South on lead		♣♧	—		

On the play of the last spade, West and North let go clubs, and East is squeezed. Pitching a heart allows South to win both tricks left in that suit. But if East discards a diamond, South follows with the Ace and 3 of diamonds. If East wins the trick, they must lead hearts conceding the last two tricks there. If West saves partner by playing the king of diamonds on the second diamond trick, they must then concede the last two tricks to dummy's Ace of clubs and now high Jack of diamonds.
