= Entry-shifting squeeze =

Strategy in Bridge

In the card game contract bridge, an entry-shifting squeeze is a positional squeeze involving a mixture between a material squeeze and an immaterial squeeze. The material part is the same as in a trump squeeze or a squeeze without the count. The immaterial part is that depending on the choice of discards of the squeeze an entry into one or into the other hand is created.

== Examples ==
| | | ♠♤ | — | | |
| | | ♥ | K 6 | | |
| | | ♦ | — | | |
| | | ♣♧ | A 5 | | |
| ♠♤ | — | N W E S | | ♠♤ | J 5 |
| ♥ | A 4 | N W E S | | ♥ | 3 |
| ♦ | K 9 | N W E S | | ♦ | — |
| ♣♧ | — | N W E S | | ♣♧ | 8 |
| | | ♠♤ | — | | |
| | | ♥ | — | | |
| | | ♦ | Q 2 | | |
| | | ♣♧ | J 2 | | |

In the first diagram clubs are trumps and South could claim all tricks on a crossruff were it not for the trump in East's hand. When the club jack is played, the entry-shifting squeeze comes to his rescue.

If West sheds a heart, the jack is overtaken with the ace, a heart ruffed and North is left with the last trump and a master heart. If West chooses to discard a diamond, the club jack is underplayed with the five. North's club ace ruffs the diamonds good and the South hand wins the last two tricks.

The entry-shifting mechanism works also in No Trumps, as can be seen in the next example.

| | | ♠♤ | A 8 6 4 | | |
| | | ♥ | — | | |
| | | ♦ | K J | | |
| | | ♣♧ | — | | |
| ♠♤ | K Q 7 | N W E S | | ♠♤ | 5 3 |
| ♥ | K Q 5 | N W E S | | ♥ | 9 8 3 |
| ♦ | — | N W E S | | ♦ | — |
| ♣♧ | — | N W E S | | ♣♧ | 3 |
| | | ♠♤ | 2 | | |
| | | ♥ | A J 10 | | |
| | | ♦ | A Q | | |
| | | ♣♧ | — | | |

As only five tricks out of remaining six cards are required, this is a squeeze without the count. It is not possible to rectify the count as there are not enough communications between the two hands. The entry-shifting mechanism will overcome this though. South leads the ♦A and West has no good discard. If he discards a spade, the ♦J is played and South continues with a spade to the ace and the spade eight. West returns a heart to South's ace, but the diamond king serves as an entry to the established spades. If West chooses to discard a heart, the diamond king is played and after ace of hearts and another heart, the ♦Q will serve as an entry.
