= Cannibal squeeze =

Type of card-game squeeze

Cannibal squeeze or suicide squeeze is a type of squeeze in bridge or whist, in which a defender is squeezed by a card played by his partner. Normally, this occurs with less-than-perfect defense, but there are also legitimate positions where the defense could not have prevailed.

== Examples ==
| | | ♠ | — | | |
| | | ♥ | — | | |
| | | ♦ | A Q | | |
| | | ♣ | 6 2 | | |
| ♠ | — | N W E S | | ♠ | — |
| ♥ | 8 | N W E S | | ♥ | — |
| ♦ | 7 3 | N W E S | | ♦ | K 4 |
| ♣ | 4 | N W E S | | ♣ | J 10 |
| West to lead | | ♠ | — | | |
| West to lead | | ♥ | — | | |
| West to lead | | ♦ | 8 5 | | |
| West to lead | | ♣ | K 3 | | |

West is on lead. If he cashes the high heart, a club is thrown from the dummy, and East is squeezed. Whichever card East discards, the declarer will take two tricks in that suit. Instead, West must lead a diamond to protect the partner from subsequent endplay (if he returns a club, the declarer will take the King and put East in with another club, forcing him to lead into ♦AQ).

The most common position for a legitimate suicide squeeze occurs when a side suit is "tangled" (neither side can lead it without giving up a trick), and another suit is protected by the partner of the player on lead, as in the following diagram:

| | | ♠ | — | | |
| | | ♥ | — | | |
| | | ♦ | Q 6 2 | | |
| | | ♣ | — | | |
| ♠ | — | N W E S | | ♠ | — |
| ♥ | 8 | N W E S | | ♥ | — |
| ♦ | J 8 | N W E S | | ♦ | K 4 |
| ♣ | — | N W E S | | ♣ | 7 |
| West to lead | | ♠ | — | | |
| West to lead | | ♥ | — | | |
| West to lead | | ♦ | A 10 | | |
| West to lead | | ♣ | 3 | | |

West is to lead; if he leads a diamond, it will "untangle" the suit for the declarer, who will take two diamond tricks. However, when he leads the high heart, he induces a simple squeeze on his partner, who must either discard the high ♣7 or unguard the diamond king. (Dummy has an idle card, and East is to play before the declarer.) Again declarer will take two tricks.
