= Simultaneous double squeeze =

Contract bridge squeeze

In contract bridge, a simultaneous double squeeze is a double squeeze in which both opponents are squeezed by the same card, as opposed to non-simultaneous double squeeze where the two opponents are squeezed in different tricks.

There are three basic matrices. In each of those, the double menace (the suit guarded by both opponents) must be accompanied by an entry, and the other two (single) menaces need not have one.

		♠	A 2		
		♥	K		
		♦	—		
		♣	—		
♠	Q 6	N W E S		♠	K 9
♥	A	N W E S		♥	—
♦	—	N W E S		♦	Q
♣	—	N W E S		♣	—
		♠	3		
		♥	—		
		♦	J		
		♣	2		

1) In the first matrix, the double menace (spades) is in one hand (dummy in the example), accompanied by an entry, and the other two are split between two declarer's hands. When the club deuce is played West has to shed a spade, dummy sheds the now useless king of hearts and East is squeezed in the pointed suits. This is a positional squeeze (it would not work with E-W hands reversed).

		♠	A 2		
		♥	K		
		♦	J		
		♣	—		
♠	Q J 9	N W E S		♠	10 8 5
♥	A	N W E S		♥	—
♦	—	N W E S		♦	Q
♣	—	N W E S		♣	—
		♠	K 6 4		
		♥	—		
		♦	—		
		♣	2		

2) The double menace (spades) is in one hand (declarer's) with entries in both hands, and two single menaces are in the other hand. The two of clubs is cashed and again West has to give up the guard in the double menace suit (spades). The now useless king of hearts is played from dummy and East is squeezed in the pointed suits. This is an automatic squeeze (working with hands interchanged), but the declarer has to know which defender guards which suit.

		♠	A K 2		
		♥	—		
		♦	2		
		♣	—		
♠	Q J 9	N W E S		♠	10 8 5
♥	A	N W E S		♥	—
♦	—	N W E S		♦	K
♣	—	N W E S		♣	—
		♠	4		
		♥	Q		
		♦	Q		
		♣	3		

3) This is the most comfortable end position of the three simultaneous double squeeze matrices, because this squeeze is automatic with no guessing game involved. There, the double menace is a 3-card menace with two winners (including an entry) sits opposite the hand with two single menaces. The declarer discards the two of diamonds on the squeeze card (♣3) regardless of West's discard. As long as the squeeze worked, all spades in the North hand must be winners, unless one of our two queens became a master. It's not possible with one spade less in the layout: there would be no room in South's hand to keep the squeeze card, two red menaces, and an entry card (small spade) in only 3 cards. It is possible, though, (but rare) with a four-card double menace:

		♠	A K Q 2		
		♥	—		
		♦	2		
		♣	—		
♠	J 9 7 5	N W E S		♠	10 8 6 4
♥	A	N W E S		♥	—
♦	—	N W E S		♦	K
♣	—	N W E S		♣	—
		♠	3		
		♥	Q 2		
		♦	Q		
		♣	3		
