= Backwash squeeze =

Type of squeeze play in bridge

Backwash squeeze is a rare squeeze which involves squeezing an opponent which lies behind declarer's menace. A variation of this, known as the "Sydney Squeeze" or "Seres Squeeze", was discovered in play at a rubber bridge game in Sydney, Australia, in 1965, by the Australian great Tim Seres; it was later attested by famous bridge theorist Géza Ottlik in an article in The Bridge World in 1974, as well as in his famous book Adventures in Card Play, co-authored with Hugh Kelsey.

By nature, backwash squeeze is a non-material trump squeeze without the count. It occurs when the declarer (or dummy) has high trump(s) but must not draw opponent's remaining trump(s). Instead, he ruffs a card high, and the opponent playing after, still having trump(s), must choose to under-ruff or give up one of menaces, either in form of a direct trick or an exit card, allowing later endplay. Since the squeeze may be without the count, the squeezed defender might take a later trick.

== Example: Backwash without the count ==
| South in 6♠ and needs 5 tricks | | ♠♤ | K J | | |
| South in 6♠ and needs 5 tricks | | ♥ | 3 2 | | |
| South in 6♠ and needs 5 tricks | | ♦ | A 5 | | |
| South in 6♠ and needs 5 tricks | | ♣♧ | — | | |
| ♠♤ | 8 5 4 | N W E S | | ♠♤ | — |
| ♥ | — | N W E S | | ♥ | Q |
| ♦ | K J | N W E S | | ♦ | 10 9 4 2 |
| ♣♧ | 5 | N W E S | | ♣♧ | J |
| North to lead | | ♠♤ | A 7 | | |
| North to lead | | ♥ | — | | |
| North to lead | | ♦ | Q 8 3 | | |
| North to lead | | ♣♧ | 9 | | |

Spades are trumps, and South needs five of the six remaining tricks, the last trick having been taken by dummy. The material for those is theoretically there by means of ♦A and crossruffing, but West's ♠8 is in the way, as he can overruff declarer's ♠7 if he tries to ruff hearts. However, West also protects diamonds, and can be thrown-in with that trump if the correct position is set up. The declarer now ruffs a heart with trump Ace (establishing the suit), and West is backwash-squeezed. If West under-ruffs, declarer will draw trumps, cash the two red suit winners, and concede the last trick. If West discards his club exit card, declarer plays two rounds of trumps and leads the ♥3.

If West discards a diamond, declarer cashes the ♦A and discards the ♣9 on the ♥3. West can ruff this, but a club return allows declarer to ruff in hand, and any other return allows declarer to draw trumps and claim the remaining tricks.

== Example: Backwash with the count (Sydney Squeeze or Seres Squeeze) ==
| | | ♠♤ | 9 | | |
| | | ♥ | J | | |
| | | ♦ | — | | |
| | | ♣♧ | 10 | | |
| ♠♤ | 7 5 | N W E S | | ♠♤ | J |
| ♥ | — | N W E S | | ♥ | Q |
| ♦ | J | N W E S | | ♦ | — |
| ♣♧ | — | N W E S | | ♣♧ | 7 |
| | | ♠♤ | — | | |
| | | ♥ | — | | |
| | | ♦ | 10 6 | | |
| | | ♣♧ | 9 | | |

This example projects the backwash squeeze into its smallest compass. Clubs are trump, but if South pulls East's last trump he will be stuck in dummy with two losers. So South ruffs a diamond with the ♣10, and East is caught in the backwash of the ruff:

- If East underruffs, South ruffs himself back to hand and cashes his established diamond.
- If East discards, that promotes a winner in dummy, which South cashes, ready to overruff on either the next-to-last or on the last trick.

Notice that there is no traditional two-card menace. Instead, the ♣9 and the ♦10 serve the function of a two-card menace. The reason that two-card menaces help simple squeezes function is that one card is used as an entry and the other as a threat to take a trick. In this backwash squeeze, the ♣9 functions as the entry and the ♦10 as the threat.

Also notice that the "U" in Clyde Love's BLUE acronym, standing for "Upper," is missing in this example. There is usually at least one card that threatens to be promoted to winner status lying over the squeezed hand. But here these two cards, the ♠9 and the ♥J, both lie under the squeezed hand. Ottlik says that this aspect of the position suggests the term "backwash".
