= Suicide squeeze =

Suicide squeeze may refer to:

- Squeeze play (baseball), a play in baseball in which the runner on third starts for home immediately while the batter attempts a bunt.
- Squeeze (bridge), a set of plays of the cards in contract bridge.
- Suicide Squeeze Records, a record label.
- Cannibal squeeze, a contract bridge squeeze also known as a suicide squeeze.
- "Suicide Squeeze", an episode of the TV series Castle
