= 25 Bridge Conventions You Should Know =

Book by Barbara Seagram

- Author: Barbara Seagram, Marc Smith
- Language: English
- Genre: Contract Bridge
- Published: 1999 (Master Point Press)
- Publication place: Canada
- Media type: Print
- Pages: 224
- ISBN: 978-1-894154-07-9

25 Bridge Conventions You Should Know is a book on contract bridge co-written by Canadian teacher and author Barbara Seagram and British player and author Marc Smith. It was published by Master Point Press in 1999.

The book is aimed at beginners, with each chapter outlining a single convention, including takeout doubles, negative doubles, and cuebid raises. All chapters are followed by a quiz.

Since its publication, the book has sold over 300,000 copies, and won the American Bridge Teachers' Association Book of the Year (Student) award. It has also been translated into French, Japanese and German.

In 2022, the book was updated and revised by Master Point Press. The new edition, while retaining the approach and features that made the original so popular, carefully revised each convention in the book to reflect changes that have occurred over the past 20 years. Additional material by David Bird, taken from 25 More Bridge Conventions You Should Know, as well as a new chapter on Meckwell, appear in this new edition.
