= Entry =

Entry may refer to:

- Entry, West Virginia, an unincorporated community in the United States
- Entry (cards), a term used in trick-taking card-games
- Entry (economics), a term in connection with markets
- Entry (film), a 2013 Indian Malayalam film
- Entry, occurrence of a repeated musical theme, especially in a fugue
- Atmospheric entry
- Royal entry, a procession of a ruler or his/her representative into a city in premodern Europe

== See also ==
- Enter (disambiguation)
- Entrance (disambiguation)
