= The Entrance =

The Entrance may refer to:

- The Entrance, New South Wales
- Electoral district of The Entrance, the electoral district in the Legislative Assembly which encompasses the above-mentioned town
- The Entrance (film), 2006
- "The Entrance", a song by Large Professor from Main Source, 2008
- "The Entrance", a song by Shinedown from Attention Attention, 2018

== See also ==
- Entrance (disambiguation)
