= Planning the Play of a Bridge Hand =

Book by Barbara Seagram

- Author: Barbara Seagram, David Bird
- Language: English
- Genre: Contract Bridge
- Publisher: Master Point Press
- Publication date: 2009
- Publication place: Canada
- Media type: Print
- Pages: 231 pp
- ISBN: 978-1-897106-33-4

Planning the Play of a Bridge Hand is a book on contract bridge co-written by the Canadian teacher and author Barbara Seagram and the British author David Bird. It was published by Master Point Press in 2009.

The book teaches novice bridge players some basic techniques of declarer play, including suit establishment, ruffing losers and the finesse. It also explains how to make a plan as declarer, teaching readers how to recognize which technique should apply on a given deal, both in no trump contracts and suit contracts. It also teaches entry management and elementary counting.

The book won the ABTA (American Bridge Teachers Association) Book of the Year award for 2010.

In 2018, their sequel, Planning the Play - The Next Level, also won an ABTA Book of the Year award, covering more complex topics.

== See also ==
- List of bridge books
- List of bridge magazines
