= Triple squeeze =

Squeeze against one player, in three suits

A triple squeeze is a contract bridge squeeze against one player, in three suits; a more explicit definition is "three simple squeezes against the same player."

It is often equated with "progressive squeeze" (also termed a "repeating squeeze"), but progressive squeezes are a subset of triple squeezes. A progressive squeeze is a triple squeeze that, depending both on entries and on positional factors, may result in a subsequent, simple, two-suit squeeze that takes place against the opponent who has just been triple squeezed. Confusing the issue is that some triple squeezes can become progressive squeezes through misdefense.

== Example: Triple squeeze with potential misdefense ==
Here is an example of a triple squeeze that should not become progressive:

		♠♤	A 5 2		
		♥	J 10 8 2		
		♦	9 4 2		
		♣♧	A 6 4		
♠♤	Q J 10	N W E S		♠♤	8 7 6 4
♥	6 3	N W E S		♥	7
♦	A K Q J 10	N W E S		♦	8 7 5 3
♣♧	Q J 10	N W E S		♣♧	8 7 3 2
		♠♤	K 9 3		
		♥	A K Q 9 5 4		
		♦	6		
		♣♧	K 9 5		

South, pushed to 5♥ by the nonvulnerable opponents, ruffs the second diamond lead and runs hearts to reach this position:

		♠♤	A 5 2		
		♥	—		
		♦	9		
		♣♧	A 6 4		
♠♤	Q J 10	N W E S		♠♤	8 7 6
♥	—	N W E S		♥	—
♦	Q	N W E S		♦	—
♣♧	Q J 10	N W E S		♣♧	8 7 3 2
		♠♤	K 9 3		
		♥	9		
		♦	—		
		♣♧	K 9 5		

South cannot be prevented from winning six more tricks, and if West isn't careful South will win all seven. When South leads his last heart, West is triple-squeezed and must discard the ♦Q to stop the overtrick. Now South discards dummy's ♠2 and crosses to the ♠A. Dummy's ♦9 is cashed, South discards the ♣5, and West lets go the ♣10. South can now cash two clubs and a spade but must give up either a spade or a club at the end.

If West discarded from a black suit when South cashed the final heart, the position would progress to another squeeze, of the simple squeeze variety. The reason that this does not occur after the ♦Q is discarded on the ♥9 is that a squeezed position requires that at least one threat sit over the squeezed opponent. After West discards, say, the ♣10 on the ♥9, dummy discards a small club, keeping dummy's ♦9 as a threat sitting over West's ♦Q. Now South can cash the ♣A, the ♣K and the ♣9 to effect another squeeze, a simple two-suit squeeze in spades and diamonds, against West.

But if West discards the ♦Q on South's final heart, South cannot arrange for a threat to sit over West's black suit holdings, a progressive squeeze cannot mature, and South is held to the one additional trick he gets from the triple squeeze.

== One threat opposite the squeeze card ==
Clyde Love, in his classic book on squeeze play, classifies triple squeezes according to the number of threats opposite the squeeze card. (This article assumes, for consistency, that it is always South who holds the squeeze card.) In the example given above, only one threat, the ♦9, was opposite the squeeze card, the ♥9, and West was squeezed. In that case, and if West defends correctly, this triple squeeze cannot become a progressive squeeze.

Again with North holding one threat, the triple squeeze will become a progressive squeeze against East if the necessary entry conditions are present: both North and South have entries in their own threat suits. In the following example, North holds one threat card (the ♠9), and East is to be triple-squeezed. Given those conditions, and with the ♥J as an entry to South's ♥4 and the ♠Q as an entry to the ♠9, the triple squeeze must always work as a progressive squeeze against East:

		♠♤	Q 9		
		♥	2		
		♦	6 4		
		♣♧	—		
♠♤	8 7 6 5	N W E S		♠♤	J 10
♥	—	N W E S		♥	10 9
♦	7	N W E S		♦	J
♣♧	—	N W E S		♣♧	—
		♠♤	4		
		♥	J 4		
		♦	9		
		♣♧	3		

At notrump, South plays the ♣3 and dummy discards the ♦4. East is triple squeezed, and regardless of his discard South can squeeze him in his two remaining suits, to win all five tricks.

== Two threats opposite the squeeze card ==
The situation is different if North has not one but two threats, accompanied by at least one entry. Then, the triple squeeze succeeds against an opponent, either one, who guards all three suits, with one exception. The exception occurs when North's entry is in South's threat suit, and South has no entry in any threat suit: then, East cannot be triple-squeezed.

For example, West is squeezed on the lead of the ♣2:

		♠♤	9		
		♥	J 5		
		♦	J 7		
		♣♧	—		
♠♤	Q	N W E S		♠♤	10 8 7
♥	9 6	N W E S		♥	—
♦	10 9	N W E S		♦	6 5
♣♧	—	N W E S		♣♧	—
		♠♤	J		
		♥	3		
		♦	3 2		
		♣♧	2		

and the squeeze also succeeds against East:

		♠♤	9		
		♥	J 5		
		♦	J 7		
		♣♧	—		
♠♤	10 8 7	N W E S		♠♤	Q
♥	—	N W E S		♥	9 6
♦	6 5	N W E S		♦	10 9
♣♧	—	N W E S		♣♧	—
		♠♤	J		
		♥	3		
		♦	3 2		
		♣♧	2		

Although with North holding two threats the triple squeeze always succeeds against East, it can never mature as a progressive squeeze. It will always become a progressive squeeze against West, however, if South and North each has an entry in their own threat suit(s). For example:

		♠♤	A 9		
		♥	6 2		
		♦	—		
		♣♧	Q 10		
♠♤	J 10	N W E S		♠♤	8 6
♥	K Q	N W E S		♥	5 4
♦	—	N W E S		♦	—
♣♧	K 7	N W E S		♣♧	9 5
		♠♤	7 2		
		♥	A J		
		♦	5		
		♣♧	A		

Notice that the triple squeeze succeeds and is progressive against West. But if East's and West's holdings are swapped, the triple squeeze succeeds, but does not become progressive if East defends correctly.
