= Barbara Seagram =

Canadian contract bridge teacher, writer, and administrator

Barbara Seagram (born 1949 in Barbados, West Indies) is a Canadian Registered Nurse and contract bridge writer, teacher, and administrator. She is co-author of thirty-eight published bridge books, including co-writing with Marc Smith 25 Bridge Conventions You Should Know, which received the American Bridge Teachers' Association (ABTA) Book of the Year award in 1999. The book was in its 19th printing and has been translated into French, German, Japanese, Portuguese and Danish. It has now been rewritten and revised in 2023.

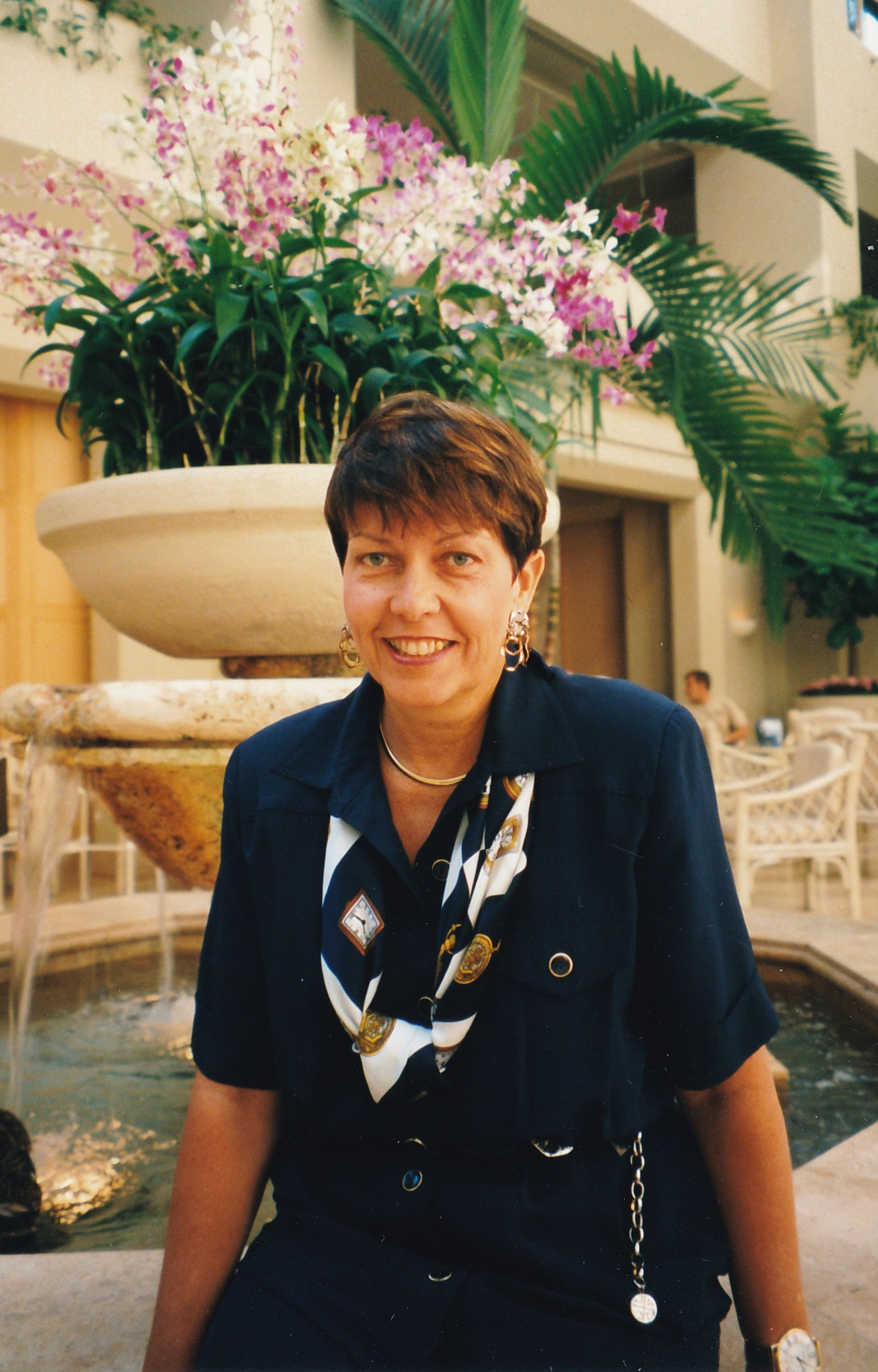
Barbara Seagram

Seagram was a member of the American Contract Bridge League (ACBL) Board of Governors from 1997 to 2009, has served as president and vice president of ACBL Unit 166 (Southern Ontario), has contributed to the ACBL Bridge Bulletin, and has been annually recognized as one of the top ten recruiters of new ACBL members. She has also served on the Board of Governors of ACBL and Board of Directors for the ABTA.

Seagram and her husband Alex Kornel run the Barbara Seagram School of Bridge in Toronto.

In 2012 the ACBL named Seagram number 40 on the list of 52 most influential bridge personalities during the organization's 75-year history, citing her work (along with Paul Cronin) promoting friendly behavior at the bridge table Zero Tolerance program.

== Publications ==
Seagram's books are joint works with one or more co-authors and are published by the bridge specialist Master Point Press of Toronto.

- 25 Bridge Conventions You Should Know (1999), with Marc Smith – winner of the American Bridge Teachers' Association 1999 BOOK OF THE YEAR
- 25 Ways to Compete in the Bidding (2000), with Smith
- 25 Ways to Take More Tricks as Declarer (2002), with David Bird
- 25 More Bridge Conventions You Should Know (2003), with Bird
- Practice Your Bidding: Jacoby 2NT (2003), with Linda Lee
- Practice Your Bidding: Roman Keycard Blackwood (2003), with Linda Lee
- Practice Your Bidding: Splinter Bids (2003), with Linda Lee
- Practice Your Bidding: Four-Suit Transfers (2004), with Andy Stark
- Practice Your Bidding: Jacoby Transfers (2004), with Stark
- Practice Your Bidding: Stayman Auctions (2004), with Linda Lee
- 25 Ways to Be a Better Defender (2006), with Bird
- Barbara Seagram's Beginning Bridge (2008), with Linda Lee
- Planning the Play of a Bridge Hand (2009), with Bird Winner of ABTA Book of The Year
- Defensive Play at Bridge: A Quiz Book (2013) with Bird
- Declarer Play at Bridge: A Quiz Book (2012) with Bird Winner of ABTA Book of the Year
- Bidding at Bridge: A Quiz Book (2014) with Bird
- Pocket Guide to Bridge (2009), with Ray Lee
- Pocket Guide to Defensive Play at Bridge (2014) with Bird
- Pocket Guide to Declarer Play at Bridge (2013) with Bird
- Pocket Guide to Bridge Conventions You Should Know (2012) with Marc Smith

Barbara's Bridge Tips (2020): winner of the American Bridge Teachers' Association 1999 BOOK OF THE YEAR

- Pocket Guide to Even More Bridge Conventions (2015) with Bird
- Pocket Guide to ACOL Bridge with Mark Horton

More Conventions: More Practice (with Bird) Planning the Defense (with Bird) Planning the Defense: The Next Level (with Bird) Two Over One by Barbara Seagram (2024) Barbara's Quizzes by Barbara Seagram (2021) Play It Safe: Barbara Seagram & David Bird (2021) Bridge: The Magic of Defense by Barbara Seagram (2023)

- Intermediate Cheat sheet
- Advanced Cheat sheet (Conventions)
- Defence Cheat sheet
- Two Over One Cheat sheet
- Doubles cheat sheet
