= Pseudo-squeeze =

Type of deceptive play in contract bridge

Pseudo-squeeze is a type of deceptive play in contract bridge. The declarer goes through the motions of executing a genuine squeeze where none exists, in the hope that a defender misreads the actual position and misdefends. The pseudo-squeeze simply gives the defender able to recognize the possibility of a squeezed position a chance to go wrong.

== Example ==
♠	4	Example 1	
♥	6	Example 1	
♦	—	Example 1	
♣	A	Example 1	
N E S		♠	K Q
N E S		♥	A
N E S		♦	—
N E S		♣	—
♠	A J		
♥	K		
♦	—		
♣	—		

Consider the simple legitimate positional squeeze in Example 1 where South is declarer requiring all remaining tricks and has the lead in dummy:

The ♣A is led from dummy and East is genuinely squeezed between hearts and spades.

- If he throws away the ♥A, declarer discards the ♠J from hand, plays hearts and makes the ♥K and the ♠A.
- If he throws away one of the spades, South discards the ♥K, plays spades, and again makes the two remaining tricks.

Example 2		♠	4		
Example 2		♥	6		
Example 2		♦	—		
Example 2		♣	A		
♠	J 3	N W E S		♠	K Q
♥	4	N W E S		♥	A
♦	—	N W E S		♦	—
♣	—	N W E S		♣	—
		♠	A 2		
		♥	K		
		♦	—		
		♣	—		

Now consider an alternate layout which from East's perspective could be identical to that above.

In double-dummy play, on the play of the ♣A, East can safely throw a spade, as his partner still guards South's ♠2 menace. However, East cannot see declarer's hand and if he throws the ♥A, then he has been pseudo-squeezed.

Example 3		♠	4		
Example 3		♥	6		
Example 3		♦	—		
Example 3		♣	A		
♠	3 2	N W E S		♠	K Q
♥	K	N W E S		♥	A
♦	—	N W E S		♦	—
♣	—	N W E S		♣	—
		♠	A J		
		♥	4		
		♦	—		
		♣	—		

In another layout, if East throws a spade on the ♣A, South makes the rest of the tricks.

== Memory squeeze ==
A memory squeeze is a sub-class of pseudo-squeeze where the declarer plays hoping that an opponent has forgotten (or not been paying attention) to the exact cards of a suit. The most basic example:

♠	K		
♥	3		
♦	—		
♣			
N E S		♠	A
N E S		♥	—
N E S		♦	A
N E S		♣	—
♠	—		
♥	?		
♦	K		
♣	—		

Declarer leads the ♥3. East realizes that declarer has the last heart, but has not been paying attention (or forgotten) which heart declarer has. If it is the 2, the lead for the last trick will be in dummy and East must keep the ♠A. If it is anything else, declarer will overtake and win the trick, so East must keep the ♦A. Declarer is playing for East to have forgotten and guess wrong.

== Defence ==
Defenders can sometimes avoid being taken in by pseudo-squeezes if they count and signal accurately. Many times, however, the position is simply too difficult. Consider this layout, constructed by Clyde E. Love:

		♠	K 4		
		♥	8 7 5 3		
		♦	A K Q 7 5 4		
		♣	8		
♠	J 8 7 5 3	N W E S		♠	10 9 2
♥	J 10 9 6	N W E S		♥	4 2
♦	10 6 2	N W E S		♦	J 9 8 3
♣	10	N W E S		♣	J 7 5 4
		♠	A Q 6		
		♥	A K Q		
		♦	—		
		♣	A K Q 9 6 3 2		

South plays 7NT and West leads the ♥J. As a genuine threat, North's diamonds are useless because they cannot be run, South has no diamond entry to support a genuine squeeze, and three diamond tricks only are no help. South has 13 tricks if the clubs break 3-2, but what if they break 4-1? In that case, only a club discard from length will help.

So South cashes the hearts and then the ♠K, ♠A and ♠Q. It cannot hurt to cut the link between the North and South hands because, as noted, North's diamonds are useless.

But East has a real problem on the sixth major suit trick, because the position makes East believe that he is squeezed. South "obviously" has at least one diamond because he didn't cash diamonds when the lead was in dummy with the ♠K. So, East thinks he must keep his diamonds and hope that West can help guard the clubs, but as soon as East discards a club South has 13 tricks. As Love states, "It would take an imbecile or a genius to discard a diamond!" Notice that neither counting nor a defensive signal can help East here – the crucial decision comes too early.

Here is a pseudo-squeeze by Victor Mollo:

		♠	6 5 4		
		♥	8 7 6		
		♦	K J 3 2		
		♣	K 8 7		
♠	K Q J	N W E S		♠	10 9 8 7
♥	J 5 4 3	N W E S		♥	K Q 10 9
♦	9 7 5 4	N W E S		♦	Q 10 8 6
♣	5 4	N W E S		♣	6
		♠	A 3 2		
		♥	A 2		
		♦	A		
		♣	A Q J 10 9 3 2		

The players were the Hideous Hog (South), Papa the Greek (West) and Molly the Mule (East).

Against the Hog's 6♣ Papa led the ♠K. With only one winner in dummy to take care of three losers in hand, the Hog went for the swindle. He won the ♠A and ran his clubs, stranding dummy's ♦K in the process. Both Papa and Molly thought that the Hog had ♦Ax in his hand – with the bare ♦A, the Hog would have cashed the diamond tops before cutting himself off from dummy.

The position with six cards left was:

		♠	6 5		
		♥	8		
		♦	K J 3		
		♣	—		
♠	Q J	N W E S		♠	—
♥	J 4	N W E S		♥	K Q 9
♦	9 7	N W E S		♦	Q 10 8
♣	—	N W E S		♣	—
		♠	3 2		
		♥	A 2		
		♦	A		
		♣	J		

When the Hog led his final club, Papa thought that he had to keep two diamonds. If he came down to the ♦9, the Hog would cash his ♦A and lead toward dummy's ♦KJ. Papa would show out and the Hog would drop Molly's ♦Q. Papa could not throw a spade, because that would allow the Hog to establish a small spade as his twelfth trick. So Papa threw the ♥4. Papa was pseudo-squeezed.

Then Molly chose to throw the ♥9 in order to retain her diamond guard. She was pseudo-squeezed as well, although earlier she had relied on Papa to keep the ♥Jx, so that she could eventually unblock under the ♥A. The Hog cashed the ♥A and ♦A and threw Molly in with a heart to lead up to the ♦KJ.
