= Linda Lee =

Linda Lee may refer to:

== People ==
- Linda Lee (bridge) (born 1947), Canadian bridge champion and co-owner of Master Point Press
- Linda Lee (politician), American politician
- Linda Lee Cadwell (born 1945), American author and widow of the martial-arts star Bruce Lee
- Lee E-jun (born 1969), Taiwanese singer also known as Linda Lee

== Fictional characters ==
- Supergirl, a DC Comics superheroine whose secret identity is Linda Lee Danvers
- Linda Lee, a character in the science fiction novel Neuromancer

== See also ==
- Linda Lee Thomas (1883–1954), American socialite who was married to songwriter Cole Porter
- Lynda Lee-Potter (1935–2004), British journalist
