= Ante Over =

Children's game

Ante Over (also known as Andy I Over, Andy Over, Annie, Annie Over, Annie, Annie Over the Shanty, Anti-Anti-I-Over, Nicky Nicky Nee) is a children's game played in the United States and Canada, dating back to at least the mid-nineteenth century. The game requires a ball or any other small object and a barrier (such as a small building) between the two teams over which the ball is thrown.

== Basic play ==
There are two teams, one on each side of the barrier. A player on the team that starts with the ball throws the ball over the barrier to the other team, yelling some version of "Ante Over" to warn them that it has been thrown. If the other team fails to catch the ball before it hits the ground, then they will yell "Ante Over" and throw it back. If the team that is thrown to catches the ball, then the player holding the ball and this team run around the building and attempt to hit one of the members of the opposing team with the ball. Players are "safe" if they succeed in running around the building without being hit. If a player is hit, they then join the team of the player who hit them with the ball. Play continues until one team has all of the players or just one is left.

In some versions of the game, if the ball bounces off the wall or rolls back without going over the roof, the thrower will yell "Pigs tail", to let the other team know the ball has been thrown but did not go over. They then yell "Ante Over" again and make another attempt to throw the ball over the roof.

An indoor version of the game uses a curtain instead of a building. Any tall obstacle that obscures the other team works for the game, although a gabled roof is part of traditional play.

When a building is used instead of a fence or some other narrow object, in some variations the ball must touch the other side of the roof. Having the ball bounce this way can make it tougher for the other side to catch. Some players even learn to finesse the ball rolling it up and over the roof.

When the barrier is a fence, or a similar obstacle that can be seen through, it is more difficult for the players to cheat as the other side can see if the ball does or does not hit the ground. When it is a building, or other opaque barrier, players can sometimes stealth to the other side, catching the other team by surprise.

One rule has it that the opposing player can only be hit below the waist as a safety precaution like in dodge ball.

In some versions, players only have to run to the other side of the building to be "safe", while other versions require them to run all the way around the building.
