= Non-simultaneous double squeeze =

Double squeeze in the card game of bridge

In bridge, a non-simultaneous double squeeze is a double squeeze in which the pressure is not applied to both opponents at the same trick. Before categorizing a little more about it we will show a diagram for the four basic matrices.

| | | ♠ | 2 | | |
| | | ♥ | A J | | |
| | | ♦ | K | | |
| | | ♣ | — | | |
| ♠ | Q 6 | N W E S | | ♠ | K 9 |
| ♥ | K Q | N W E S | | ♥ | 3 |
| ♦ | — | N W E S | | ♦ | A |
| ♣ | — | N W E S | | ♣ | — |
| | | ♠ | A 3 | | |
| | | ♥ | 2 | | |
| | | ♦ | — | | |
| | | ♣ | A | | |

1) When the club ace is played West is squeezed immediately and has to shed a spade. North plays the now useless jack of hearts and East still has an idle card to throw, the three of hearts. But when the heart deuce is led up to the ace, East is squeezed on his turn in the pointed suits. This is a positional squeeze.

| | | ♠ | 2 | | |
| | | ♥ | A J | | |
| | | ♦ | K | | |
| | | ♣ | 2 | | |
| ♠ | Q 6 5 | N W E S | | ♠ | J 9 4 |
| ♥ | 3 | N W E S | | ♥ | K Q |
| ♦ | A | N W E S | | ♦ | — |
| ♣ | — | N W E S | | ♣ | — |
| | | ♠ | A K 3 | | |
| | | ♥ | 2 | | |
| | | ♦ | — | | |
| | | ♣ | A | | |

2) When the club ace is played West can shed a heart, but East is squeezed and has to give up his spade guard. When the heart deuce is led to the ace it is West who is squeezed in the pointed suits. This is an automatic squeeze.

| | | ♠ | K 3 | | |
| | | ♥ | A J | | |
| | | ♦ | Q | | |
| | | ♣ | — | | |
| ♠ | Q 6 5 | N W E S | | ♠ | J 9 4 |
| ♥ | K Q | N W E S | | ♥ | 3 |
| ♦ | — | N W E S | | ♦ | K |
| ♣ | — | N W E S | | ♣ | — |
| | | ♠ | A 7 2 | | |
| | | ♥ | — | | |
| | | ♦ | 2 | | |
| | | ♣ | A | | |

3) When the club ace is played West is squeezed immediately and has to shed a spade. North plays the now useless jack of hearts and East still has an idle card to throw, the three of hearts. A spade is led to the king and the heart ace is cashed. On that card East is squeezed in the pointed suits. This is a positional squeeze.

| | | ♠ | 2 | | |
| | | ♥ | A K 8 | | |
| | | ♦ | — | | |
| | | ♣ | 2 | | |
| ♠ | Q 5 | N W E S | | ♠ | J 8 |
| ♥ | Q J 9 | N W E S | | ♥ | 3 |
| ♦ | — | N W E S | | ♦ | K |
| ♣ | — | N W E S | | ♣ | 3 |
| | | ♠ | A 3 | | |
| | | ♥ | 2 | | |
| | | ♦ | Q | | |
| | | ♣ | A | | |

4)When the club ace is played West is squeezed immediately and has to shed a spade. Two hearts are cashed and East is squeezed between the pointed suits on the second of them. This is an automatic squeeze.

In all double squeezes the second squeeze card is opposed to (that is in the other hand than) the first squeeze card (it could be in the same hand in diagram (2) though). The double menace is always in the same hand than the first squeeze card. In matrices (1) and (2) the second squeeze executes immediately after the first. For that reason the squeeze card is an entry to North. In matrices (3) and (4) we cross to the North hand and then execute the squeeze, two tricks later than the first one. But that could even be later as demonstrated by the following diagram, which is a somehow extreme variation of (4).

| | | ♠ | 3 | | |
| | | ♥ | A K Q J 10 2 | | |
| | | ♦ | — | | |
| | | ♣ | 2 | | |
| ♠ | Q 6 | N W E S | | ♠ | K 9 |
| ♥ | 9 8 7 6 5 4 | N W E S | | ♥ | - |
| ♦ | — | N W E S | | ♦ | A K Q J 10 9 |
| ♣ | — | N W E S | | ♣ | — |
| | | ♠ | A 2 | | |
| | | ♥ | 3 | | |
| | | ♦ | 5 4 3 2 | | |
| | | ♣ | A | | |

We have an eight card ending and by playing the club ace West is squeezed, forced to give up a spade. East will be squeezed five tricks later on the heart ten.
