= Pin (bridge) =

Bridge (card game) tactic

In bridge and similar trick-taking games, the term pin refers to the lead of a higher card from one hand to capture a singleton of lower rank in an opponent's hand.

== Example ==
	A 10 9 8 4	
K 7 6 5	W N↑ S↓ E	J
	Q 3 2	

South wants five tricks from this suit. If the opponents' cards split 3-2 and they defend rationally, South must lose at least one trick – dropping a singleton king won't help South. However, if East holds the singleton jack then South can begin by lead the queen and pinning the jack. Provided declarer can re-enter his hand at least once, he can then take up to two finesses to capture the king.

The tactic is also available to the defense, but it is more difficult to find when declarer holds the singleton.
