= Julian Pottage =

British bridge player, writer and teacher

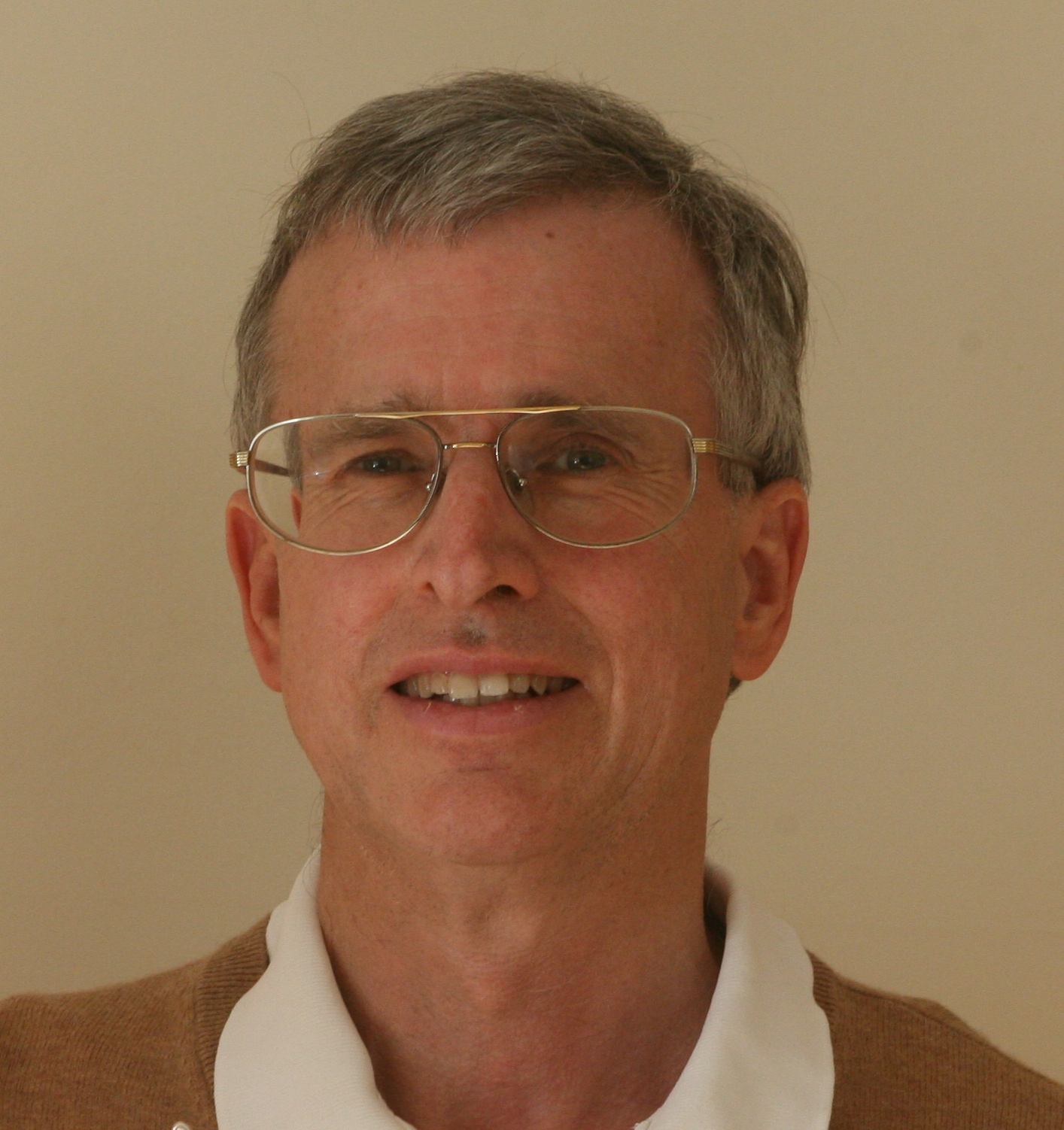
Julian Y. Pottage

Julian Y. Pottage (born 1962) is a British contract bridge player, writer, and teacher, who studied mathematics at Trinity College, Cambridge. He is also well known as a collector of bridge problems, and writes a monthly problem column in Britain's Bridge Magazine.

He is the Bridge Correspondent for The Daily Telegraph, a regular contributor to English Bridge and, prior to Mr Bridge’s retirement, was Associate Editor of BRIDGE.

He has written or co-authored 26 books on bridge, including Bridge Problems for a New Millennium and The Extra Edge In Play with Terence Reese (1913–1996). He also co-edited the 2010 second edition of Clyde E. Love's Bridge Squeezes Complete.

His book Play or Defend? won the International Bridge Press Association's 2004 Book of the Year Award, as did A Great Deal of Bridge Problems, in 2014.

Pottage is from Hampshire and went to school at St John's College in Southsea and Millfield school in Somerset. After reading mathematics at Trinity College Cambridge, Julian had a career in the occupational pensions industry. More recently his work has concentrated on bridge writing and breeding golden retriever dogs, his kennel name being Yorkbeach.

As a player, Pottage has participated in several national and international events, notably winning the Pachabo and Tollemache double in 1999. In recent years he has won several simultaneous pairs, including the inaugural Peter Jordan trophy. Julian was in the winning England team in the 1984 Junior Camrose and, having moved to Wales in 2005, has represented Wales in a number of international competitions. Since 2023, his caps for Wales include the most recent 3 European Championships and at least 1 Camrose weekend for each of the preceding 6 years.

He lives in Wales. He and his wife have 4 now adult children.

== Bibliography ==
Books created by Julian Pottage
Title	Published	Co-author
Art of Psychic Bidding, the	2003	Peter Burrows
Back through the Pack	2006	
Bridge Behind Bars	2008	Nick Smith
Bridge Player's Companion, the	2006	
Bridge Problems for a New Millennium	2001	
Clues from the Bidding at Bridge	1990 2005	
Defend or Declare	2012	
Defend These Hands with Me	2006	
Easy Guide to Defensive Signals at Bridge	2005	
Extra Edge in Play at Bridge	1994 2005	Terence Reese
Golden Rules for Rubber Bridge Players, the	2005	
Golden Rules of Competitive Auctions, the	2003	Marc Smith
Golden Rules of Constructive Bidding, the	2002	Marc Smith
Golden Rules of Declarer play, the	2001	Marc Smith
Golden Rules of Defence, the	2000	Marc Smith
Golden Rules of Opening Leads, the	2004	
Great Deal of Bridge Problems, a	2007	
Little Book of Bridge Secrets	2012	
Masterpieces of Declarer Play	2001	
Masterpieces of Defence	2002	
More Hocus Pocus	2002	Erwin Brecher
Play or Defend	2003	
Positive Declarer Play at Bridge	1986 2005	Terence Reese
Positive Defense at Bridge	1985 2005	Terence Reese
Why You still Lose at Bridge	2013	
Win the Big Match	2004	
