= Entry squeeze =

Card game move

An entry squeeze move in contract bridge exerts pressure by threatening the length of a defender's holding in a side suit. In many familiar squeezed positions, such as a simple or double squeeze, the rank of a defender's holding prevents declarer from cashing a threat until the squeeze has matured. This situation is also present in entry squeezes, but in addition a defensive holding interferes with declarer's entries, preventing declarer from effectively going back and forth between his hand and dummy.

The entry squeeze is sometimes described as a "non-material" squeeze. The entry squeeze may weaken a defender's holding in a suit where declarer can already take winners, but cannot take them in the preferred hand or in the preferred order. Therefore, it is only in part a squeeze against high cards, and so is not entirely material.

Geza Ottlik and Hugh Kelsey give this example:

		♠♤	K 7		
		♥	8 4 3		
		♦	K 6 5 2		
		♣♧	J 8 4 3		
♠♤	10 8 5 3	N W E S		♠♤	A Q 6
♥	10 7 5 2	N W E S		♥	A J 9
♦	J	N W E S		♦	9 8 7 3
♣♧	9 6 5 2	N W E S		♣♧	Q 10 7
Lead: ♠3		♠♤	J 9 4 2		
Lead: ♠3		♥	K Q 6		
Lead: ♠3		♦	A Q 10 4		
Lead: ♠3		♣♧	A K		

Choosing the fourth best in his longest and strongest suit, West leads the ♠3 against 3NT. East plays three rounds of spades, declarer winning the third with the ♠J and discarding dummy's ♣3. South cashes the ♦AQ, on which West discards a heart.

The position is now:

		♠♤	—		
		♥	8 4 3		
		♦	K 6		
		♣♧	J 8 4		
♠♤	10	N W E S		♠♤	—
♥	10 7 5	N W E S		♥	A J 9
♦	—	N W E S		♦	9 8
♣♧	9 6 5 2	N W E S		♣♧	Q 10 7
		♠♤	9		
		♥	K Q 6		
		♦	10 4		
		♣♧	A K		

Declarer would like to lead toward his ♥KQ twice, but his entry situation is such that he can get to dummy in diamonds once only. If he thinks of it, declarer can now play the ♠9, a losing squeeze card, to West's ♠10. So doing destroys East's hand.

If East discards a club, declarer can subsequently unblock the ♣AK and score the ♣J. If East discards a heart, declarer can establish two heart tricks with only one lead from dummy. If East discards a diamond, declarer gets two entries to dummy: he overtakes the ♦10 with the ♦K, leads a heart toward his ♥KQ6, and later, if necessary, leads the ♦4 to the ♦6, for another heart lead toward his remaining honor.

Ottlik and Kelsey summarize this entry squeeze as follows: "Those silly little diamonds in the East hand have a function after all. Idle, irrelevant or immaterial as they may be called, by their mere existence they also serve. They stand and wait, in the way, blocking traffic, hindering enemy lines of communication. And having this value, however silent and hidden, they are subject to the pressure of a squeeze."

Another Ottlik – Kelsey entry squeeze:

		♠♤	J 7 4		
		♥	A K Q J		
		♦	A Q		
		♣♧	A Q J 6		
♠♤	10 9 8 6 2	N W E S		♠♤	K 3
♥	10	N W E S		♥	9 7 6 4 2
♦	K J 6	N W E S		♦	9 8 4 2
♣♧	K 9 7 3	N W E S		♣♧	8 5
		♠♤	A Q 5		
		♥	8 5 3		
		♦	10 7 5 3		
		♣♧	10 4 2		

North overbids wildly to 7NT and West leads the ♠10. South unblocks dummy's ♠7, East covers with the ♠K and South wins. In a sense, declarer has 13 tricks: three spades, four hearts, two diamonds with the finesse, and four clubs with repeated finesses. But there aren't enough apparent entries to the South hand to take all those finesses.

South finesses the ♦Q, cashes the ♦A, and runs the hearts. The fourth heart squeezes West (South throws the ♦7):

		♠♤	J 4		
		♥	J		
		♦	—		
		♣♧	A Q J 6		
♠♤	9 8	N W E S		♠♤	3
♥	—	N W E S		♥	9 7
♦	K	N W E S		♦	9 8
♣♧	K 9 7 3	N W E S		♣♧	8 5
		♠♤	Q 5		
		♥	—		
		♦	10 7		
		♣♧	10 4 2		

A club discard lets South pick up the clubs with two finesses, using the ♣10 to force a cover or retain the lead, so only one entry to the South hand is needed. A spade discard gives South an additional entry, so that he can overtake the ♠J with the ♠Q, finesse in clubs, and finally lead to the ♠5 to squeeze West between clubs and diamonds.

But suppose that West discards the ♦K on the fourth heart. Now, ♠4 to the ♠Q and the ♦10 is cashed. West throws the ♠9 and dummy the ♠J. The ♠5 is cashed, West is finally forced to discard a club – and dummy is one-suit squeezed (!) in this position, with dummy to play:

		♠♤	—		
		♥	—		
		♦	—		
		♣♧	A Q J 6		
♠♤	—	N W E S		♠♤	—
♥	—	N W E S		♥	9
♦	—	N W E S		♦	9
♣♧	K 9 7	N W E S		♣♧	8 5
		♠♤	—		
		♥	—		
		♦	—		
		♣♧	10 4 2		

So, declarer does not lead dummy's ♠4 after West discards the ♦K. Instead, he leads dummy's ♠J and overtakes with the ♠Q. Now when South cashes the ♦10, West must either discard a club a trick earlier, while dummy still has an idle spade, or allow South a re-entry with the ♠5. This would not have been possible if South had not unblocked the ♠7 at trick 1.
