= Bridge Squeezes Complete =

Book about bridge (card game)

- 2010 revised edition cover
- Author: Clyde E. Love
- Publication date: 1959

Bridge Squeezes Complete is a book on contract bridge written by Ann Arbor, Michigan-based mathematics professor Clyde E. Love, originally published in 1959. Written in a "dry, mathematical way", it is still considered one of the most important bridge books ever written and the squeeze vocabulary Love invented remains the basis for all discussions of squeezes.

Reprints of the original text have been published in 1961 by Mayflower (London), in 1968 by Dover (New York) and in 1969 by Constable (London). A revised edition, edited by Linda Lee and Julian Pottage, was published by Master Point Press in 2010.

An interactive software presentation of the original text was developed by Lorne Russell in 2006 and translated into French by Theo VanDommelen in 2008.

== See also ==
- Squeeze play bibliography
