= Saturated squeeze =

Bridge (cards) tactic

The saturated squeeze is a type of squeeze play in the card game of Bridge.

The key feature of the saturated squeeze is that it involves threats in all four suits, and all four threats are necessary for the squeeze to function. Accordingly, saturated squeezes can only occur in notrump contracts, and they are always non-simultaneous, with each defender being squeezed in turn as one or more winners are cashed in a suit guarded by the other defender.

At least 20 positions exist, with different arrangements of menaces and entries. The following diagram demonstrates the simplest form of saturated squeeze:

		♠	-		
		♥	-		
		♦	AK9		
		♣	A2		
♠	A	/ N; W / / E; / S		♠	K
♥	A	/ N; W / / E; / S		♥	K
♦	QJ10	/ N; W / / E; / S		♦	-
♣	-	/ N; W / / E; / S		♣	QJ10
		♠	2		
		♥	2		
		♦	-		
		♣	K93		

Here West has the only diamond stopper, East has the only club stopper, and the major suits are protected by both defenders. When the ace of clubs is cashed, West must abandon one of the majors, and now cashing the top diamonds squeezes East between that major and clubs.

Here is an example of a more complex saturated squeeze ending:

		♠	2		
		♥	-		
		♦	AK9		
		♣	A42		
♠	A	/ N; W / / E; / S		♠	K
♥	Q108	/ N; W / / E; / S		♥	J97
♦	-	/ N; W / / E; / S		♦	QJ10
♣	QJ10	/ N; W / / E; / S		♣	-
		♠	-		
		♥	AK2		
		♦	2		
		♣	K53		

This time West has the club stopper, East has the diamond stopper, and once again the major suits are protected by both defenders. Declarer cashes the diamond ace, on which West cannot discard a club, and

(i) if West discards the spade, declarer continues with the diamond king (discarding a club from the South hand), forcing West to abandon hearts as well. Now declarer can cash either club winner to squeeze East in three suits.

(ii) if West discards a heart, and then discards another heart on the king of diamonds (again, South discards a club), declarer next cashes the king of clubs. East must retain the heart and diamond stoppers, so must discard a spade. Now cashing the top hearts squeezes West in the black suits.
