= Entrance =

Entrance generally refers to the place of entering like a gate, door, or road or the permission to do so.

Entrance may also refer to:

- Entrance (album), a 1970 album by Edgar Winter
- Entrance (display manager), a login manager for the X window manager
- Entrance (liturgical), a kind of liturgical procession in the Eastern Orthodox tradition
- Entrance (musician), born Guy Blakeslee
- Entrance (film), a 2011 film
- Entrance, Alberta, a community in Canada
- The Entrance, New South Wales, a suburb in Central Coast, New South Wales, Australia
- "Entrance", a song by Dimmu Borgir from the 1997 album Enthrone Darkness Triumphant
- Entry (cards), a card that wins a trick to which another player made the lead
- N-Trance, a British electronic music group formed in 1990
- University and college admissions
- Entrance Hall
- Entryway

== See also ==
- Enter (disambiguation)
- Entry (disambiguation)
