= Clash squeeze =

Three suit bridge squeeze with a special kind of menace

A clash squeeze is a three suit bridge squeeze with a special kind of menace, referred to as clash menace. The clash menace is one that might fall under a winner in the opposite hand, because it can be covered by another card in an opponent's hand. If the clash squeeze can force the opponent to discard his guard, then the clash menace can be cashed separately from the winner opposite. For example, consider this layout of the spade suit:

	A 2	
K	W N↑ S↓ E	J 10
	Q	

The ♠Q is the clash menace. If, when South plays another suit, West can be forced to discard the ♠K, then the ♠Q and the ♠A can be cashed on separate tricks. Notice the presence of the ♠2, a companion that releases the clash menace to be cashed separately from the ♠A. The ♠2 also serves as a simple menace against East, requiring West to retain his clash-menace guard to allow his partner to guard the suit.

Clash squeezes were described and analyzed by Chien-Hwa Wang in Bridge Magazine, in 1956 and 1957.

== Examples ==
Here is a simple, positional clash squeeze, with the ♣8 as the clash menace:

		♠♤	—		
		♥	—		
		♦	J 8		
		♣♧	10 3		
♠♤	—	N W E S		♠♤	—
♥	J	N W E S		♥	—
♦	10 9	N W E S		♦	7 5
♣♧	9	N W E S		♣♧	7 6
		♠♤	6		
		♥	10		
		♦	3		
		♣♧	8		

South leads the ♠6. If West discards the ♥J, the ♥10 becomes a winner. If West discards a diamond, the ♣3 is discarded and the ♦J and ♦8 are cashed. If West discards the ♣9, South discards dummy's ♦8 and cashes the ♣8. Then the ♦3 to dummy allows the ♣10 to score. Note the presence of the Vise theme.

This is a secondary clash squeeze:

		♠♤	K 4		
		♥	—		
		♦	10 2		
		♣♧	9 6		
♠♤	7 6 5	N W E S		♠♤	9 8
♥	—	N W E S		♥	—
♦	9	N W E S		♦	6 5
♣♧	8 7	N W E S		♣♧	10 4
		♠♤	A 3 2		
		♥	J		
		♦	8		
		♣♧	3		

South cashes the ♥J. If West discards a spade, South will make one of his small spades. If West discards a club, one of dummy's clubs will become a winner. And if West discards the ♦9, South cashes the clash menace, the ♦8.

Here is a simultaneous, double clash squeeze:

		♠♤	—		
		♥	J 3 2		
		♦	J		
		♣♧	10		
♠♤	—	N W E S		♠♤	—
♥	9 8	N W E S		♥	6 5 4
♦	10 4	N W E S		♦	9 5
♣♧	J	N W E S		♣♧	—
		♠♤	J		
		♥	10 7		
		♦	8 2		
		♣♧	—		

South leads the ♠J and West is clash squeezed. Discarding the ♣J gives up immediately. If West discards a heart, South cashes the ♥10 and ♥7 before crossing to the ♦J for the ♥J. If West discards a diamond, South discards the ♣10 and East is squeezed in the reds.

Finally, here's a non-simultaneous double clash squeeze:

		♠♤	10 4 3		
		♥	—		
		♦	—		
		♣♧	J 4		
♠♤	9 6 5	N W E S		♠♤	8 7
♥	J	N W E S		♥	10
♦	—	N W E S		♦	—
♣♧	10	N W E S		♣♧	8 7
		♠♤	J 2		
		♥	9		
		♦	J		
		♣♧	9		

This double clash squeeze consists of a clash squeeze against West, followed two tricks later by a simple squeeze against East. South leads the ♦J. West cannot throw the ♣10 because that establishes South's clash menace, and a spade discard sets up North's spades. So West throws the ♥J. Now South cashes the ♠10 and the ♠J, in that order, to squeeze East in hearts and clubs.

There are other positions, including trump squeezes with clash menaces.
