= Enter =

Enter or ENTER may refer to:

- Enter key, on computer keyboards
- Enter, Netherlands, a village
- Enter (magazine), an American technology magazine for children 1983–1985
- Enter (Finnish magazine), a Finnish computer magazine
- Enter Air, a Polish airline
- Equivalent National Tertiary Entrance Rank, an Australian school student assessment

== Music ==
- Enter (Cybotron album) or the title song, 1983
- Enter (Russian Circles album) or the title song, 2006
- Enter (Within Temptation album) or the title song, 1997
- Enter, an album by Bin-Jip, 2010
- Enter, an album by DJ Kentaro, 2007

== See also ==
- Entrance (disambiguation)
- Entry (disambiguation)
- Access (disambiguation)
