= Criss-cross squeeze =

Bridge (card game) tactic

In contract bridge, the criss-cross squeeze is a variant of the simple squeeze in which both menaces are blocked. However, the blocking cards provide the necessary communication between hands after the squeeze has been effected. Unblocking in the correct order allows the squeezing player to cash the newly created winner; but this requires an exact count of the hand – or a correct guess.

== Examples ==
Example 1		♠	Q 5
Example 1		♥	A
Example 1		♦	—
Example 1		♣	2
♠	K 3	N W S	
♥	K 3	N W S	
♦	—	N W S	
♣	—	N W S	
		♠	A
		♥	Q 5
		♦	—
		♣	A

The menaces are the major-suit queens, blocked by the corresponding aces. One of those aces will serve as entry or re-entry to whichever queen is established by the squeeze. When South cashes the ♣A as squeeze card, West must blank (unguard) one of his kings. The declarer can then cash the ace of the suit in which West has bared his king, and cross to the other ace, which serves as entry to the now-established queen.

Example 2		♠	Q 5		
Example 2		♥	A		
Example 2		♦	—		
Example 2		♣	2		
♠	4 2	N W E S		♠	K 3
♥	4 2	N W E S		♥	K 3
♦	—	N W E S		♦	—
♣	—	N W E S		♣	—
		♠	A		
		♥	Q 5		
		♦	—		
		♣	A		

A criss-cross squeeze is technically an automatic squeeze, i.e. it works against either opponent – although a guess as to which opponent (if either) has been squeezed may be required in the end position after playing the squeeze card (here, ♣A). If the complete hand is as shown here, then East is squeezed; but if declarer cannot be certain from the previous bidding and play who holds both kings, he will have to guess which suit to play first if the defenders discard in different suits (as they should). If the kings are in different hands, there is no squeeze: both defenders will have idle cards to discard in the suit in which they do not hold a king.

== See also ==
- Glossary of contract bridge terms
