= Stepping-stone squeeze =

Advanced type of squeeze in contract bridge

The stepping-stone squeeze is an advanced type of squeeze in contract bridge. It is used when the declarer has enough high cards to take all but one of the remaining tricks, but does not have enough communication between the hands to cash them. It was analyzed and named by Terence Reese in the book "The Expert Game", also titled "Master Play in Contract Bridge".

The following position is an example of a Stepping-stone squeeze:

		♠♤	A J		
		♥	2		
		♦	—		
		♣♧	2		
♠♤	Q 3	N W E S		♠♤	—
♥	A	N W E S		♥	—
♦	3	N W E S		♦	9 8 7 6
♣♧	—	N W E S		♣♧	—
		♠♤	K		
		♥	K		
		♦	2		
		♣♧	A		

South has three winners: The ♠K, ♠A, and ♣A. However, after cashing the ♠K, there will be no entry to the North hand to enjoy the ♠A. However, on the play of ♣A, West is squeezed. Discarding a spade allows South to overtake the ♠K to get two tricks in the suit. Throwing the ♥A lets South cash the ♥K. Therefore, West parts with the ♦3. Now South is able to play the ♠K and lead the ♥K, putting West on lead with only the ♠Q remaining in hand.

The name stepping-stone alludes to South's use of West's ♥A to cross over to the abandoned ♠A.

This squeeze would work equally well with the East and West hands reversed.

An interesting variation is the following ending playing in no trumps with the lead in South:

		♠♤	A K 6 2		
		♥	—		
		♦	5		
		♣♧	—		
♠♤	Q 9 5	N W E S		♠♤	8 7 4
♥	A 9	N W E S		♥	K 8
♦	—	N W E S		♦	—
♣♧	—	N W E S		♣♧	—
		♠♤	J 10		
		♥	Q J 3		
		♦	—		
		♣♧	—		

Needing all but one of the remaining tricks, the declarer leads the ♠10 covered by West, dummy winning with the ♠A. When the winning diamond is led from dummy (declarer throwing a heart) both defenders are subjected to a stepping-stone squeeze. If they both throw spades then declarer cashes the spades in dummy. If one defender keeps two spades then declarer plays a small spade to the ♠J and leads a heart. Now the defender who kept spades wins his stiff honour and must lead a spade to dummy's winner. His partner cannot overtake as this sets up the ♥Q.
