= Single-suit squeeze =

Squeeze play in contract bridge

A single-suit squeeze is a unique squeeze play in contract bridge that occurs with an awkward defensive distribution of one suit. It contains elements of a squeeze and a throw-in. It is a kind of immaterial squeeze, in which a discard does not cost a trick directly, but gives up a position, allowing the opponents to adopt a winning line.

== Example ==
This example shows a one-suit squeeze in which the victim can choose between an endplay or a simple promotion:

		♠	K 8 5		
		♥	—		
		♦	3		
		♣	—		
♠	10 2	N W E S		♠	A Q J 3
♥	K 3	N W E S		♥	—
♦	—	N W E S		♦	—
♣	—	N W E S		♣	—
South to lead		♠	9 4		
South to lead		♥	2		
South to lead		♦	5		
South to lead		♣	—		

If the five of diamonds is played, East must choose whether to discard the spade three or an intermediate honor.

By throwing the three East chooses an endplay; South simply ducks a small spade to East, who has to lead up to the king. By throwing an intermediate honor, East allows for a promotion of the eight; South leads the nine, West has to cover in order to avoid an endplay and the eight will eventually become master. Note that if the spade five and three were exchanged the squeeze still works. East can choose between an endplay to the king, or an endplay to the eight.
