= Vienna coup =

Unblocking technique in contract bridge

The Vienna coup is an unblocking technique in contract bridge made in preparation for a squeeze play. It is so named because it was originally published by James Clay (1804-1873) after observing it being executed in the days of whist by "the greatest player in Vienna" — identity unknown.

== Examples ==
♠	A J	Example 1 South to lead	
♥	A	Example 1 South to lead	
♦	—	Example 1 South to lead	
♣	2	Example 1 South to lead	
N E S		♠	K Q
N E S		♥	K 4
N E S		♦	—
N E S		♣	—
♠	4		
♥	Q 2		
♦	—		
♣	A		

On the play of the ♣A by South, East is squeezed but can escape by throwing a small heart. Although the ♥Q is now set up, South must next play either the ♥Q, ♥2 or ♠4 to be won in dummy and has no entry back to cash it; he must now lose a spade to East.

♠	A J	Example 2 North to lead	
♥	—	Example 2 North to lead	
♦	—	Example 2 North to lead	
♣	2	Example 2 North to lead	
N E S		♠	K Q
N E S		♥	K
N E S		♦	—
N E S		♣	—
♠	4		
♥	Q		
♦	—		
♣	A		

However, if instead, South plays the ♥2 to the ♥A, East is squeezed when declarer next leads the ♣2 to the ace.

- If East discards the ♥K, declarer cashes the ♥Q discarding the ♠J and leads to the ♠A.
- If East discards the ♠K or ♠Q, declarer cashes the ♠A and ♠J.

♠	A J	Example 3 South to lead	
♥	—	Example 3 South to lead	
♦	2	Example 3 South to lead	
♣	—	Example 3 South to lead	
N E S		♠	K Q
N E S		♥	K
N E S		♦	—
N E S		♣	—
♠	4		
♥	Q		
♦	—		
♣	A		

In this layout there is no way to get back to the hand by playing the ♣2 to the ace. In this case, the ♥A must have been cashed already at an earlier stage to squeeze East when declarer leads the ♣A and discards the ♦2 from the table.
