= Ruff (cards) =

Trump play in trick-taking card games

In trick-taking games, to ruff means to play a trump card to a trick (other than when trumps were led). According to the rules of most games, a player must have no cards left in the suit led in order to ruff. Since the other players are constrained to follow suit if they can, even a low trump can win a trick. In some games, like Pinochle and Preferans, the player who cannot follow suit is required to ruff. In others, like Bridge and Whist, he may instead discard (play any card in any other suit). Normally, ruffing will win a trick. But it is also possible that a subsequent player will overruff (play a higher trump). Historically, ruff meant to "rob" i.e. exchange a card with the stock.

== Usage of the word "ruff" vs. "trump" ==
"Ruff" is normally a verb, meaning "to play a trump card when a non-trump suit was led". "To trump" can be used as a synonym of "to ruff", but "ruff" is normally preferred, for clarity. As a noun, "ruff" and "trump" are completely different – "a ruff" means only "an instance of ruffing", while "(a) trump" means only "the suit that outranks all other suits", or "a card in this suit". Hence:

- One can "give a ruff" to partner but not "give a trump".
- "Hearts are trumps" but not "Hearts are ruffs".
- "Cross ruffing" and "cross trumping" are both correct, but "cross ruffing" is preferred.
- "Ruff and discard" is common usage but "trump and discard" is not.

== Ruffing and cross-ruffing in partnership games ==
- A player gives a ruff by leading a card of a suit in which partner is void, enabling the trick to be taken with a trump card. Partner will then attempt to get the lead back into the original hand, by leading a certain suit, so that the process can be repeated.
- A crossruff is a play where tricks are made by taking alternate ruffs in each hand. In order to use a crossruff, each player in the partnership must have shortness in a non-trump suit, accompanied with appropriate length in the opposite hand. It is preferable that both players have an equal number of cards in the trump suit, otherwise a regular ruff is usually more effective, as it has the added benefit of establishing the trump suit.
  - The mechanics of the crossruff are simple but the effect can be dramatic as this extreme example, from a bridge hand, demonstrates:

♠♤	AJ8543	W E	♠♤	Q109762
♥	-	W E	♥	-
♦	-	W E	♦	9876543
♣♧	9876543	W E	♣♧	-

West plays the grand slam of 7♠ despite having only 5 high card points. The declarer can draw the outstanding trump king, ruff the diamonds in dummy, going back to the hand by club ruffs. Unless both minor suits are divided 6-0, one of the minor suits will ultimately become high and provide the missing two tricks. In summary, the declarer took one trick by leading a high card (the ace of trumps) and 10 tricks by cross-ruffing; the remaining two tricks came as result of long suit establishment.

  - However, there are risks with crossruffing: when the opponents also run out of cards in the suit(s) being ruffed, they can overruff (play a higher trump card); also this play may leave the trump suit unestablished so that opponents may be able to steal back a trick or two using their trumps later. Crossruffing is therefore just one possible strategy for taking extra tricks, others are establishing the trump suit, traditional ruffing and finessing.
  - Bridge considerations: the additional information given by the existence of the "dummy" in bridge produces many opportunities for ruffing and cross-ruffing
    - It is often important to cash side-suit winners before commencing a cross-ruff, otherwise the opponents may discard in the side-suit, allowing them to trump the winner later.
    - In some cases, it is effective to cross-ruff after drawing the opponents' trumps, when this can be done with trumps remaining in both hands.
    - In other cases, it is effective to cross-ruff only until one opponent becomes likely to be void in a particular suit, and revert to drawing trumps thereafter.
  - The basic defense against crossruff is simple: lead trumps whenever possible, removing trumps from both opponent's hands. In bridge this may mean that, the defense must lead trumps from the opening lead in order to prevail. Thus, it is important to recognize the situations when a trump opening lead is called for – usually, they arise when both declarer and dummy have bid other suits but found the trump fit in the third one.

== Ruff and discard ==
		♠♤	7		
		♥	—		
		♦	—		
		♣♧	3		
♠♤	—	N W E S		♠♤	—
♥	Q 9	N W E S		♥	—
♦	—	N W E S		♦	—
♣♧	—	N W E S		♣♧	Q J
		♠♤	6		
		♥	—		
		♦	—		
		♣♧	7		

A ruff and discard (also known as ruff and slough or ruff and sluff) occurs when a player leads a suit that neither opponent has – typically in a suit contract, a defender leads a suit in which dummy and declarer are both void and dummy and declarer have at least one trump each. This gives declarer the option of discarding a losing card from one hand while playing a trump from the other, usually garnering an additional trick in the process. Thus, the ruff and discard is generally to be avoided by the defenders, except in rare cases where declarer has no side suit loser to discard. It is often inflicted upon the defence via an endplay.

In the position shown, West is on lead and spades are trumps: When West leads a heart, declarer can ruff in one hand and throw a club loser from the other, making both the remaining tricks. With any other player on lead, declarer would only make one trick.

However, if one of N-S hands had a diamond instead of a club, then West's lead would make no difference: the declarer can always take the remaining two tricks by crossruffing clubs and diamonds.

Similar events can occur in other trick taking games where partnerships exist (e.g. whist) and occasionally for the defending side in bridge.

== Uses of ruffing techniques in bridge and other whist type games ==
=== Dummy reversal ===
Dummy reversal (also known as reverse dummy) is a technique in contract bridge whereby declarer uses trump cards to ruff from the hand with more (longer) trumps, and retains the trumps in the other (shorter) hand to draw the opponents' remaining trumps. Normally in play technique, ruffs are taken from the hand with shorter trumps, retaining trumps in the longer hand for control. Declarer, being the first to have bid the suit, usually has more trumps than his partner (the eventual dummy) and so the term "dummy reversal" is used to describe the case where during the play, dummy is made to have more.

The purpose of dummy reversal is to yield more tricks than the normal technique; the technique can be adapted for use in other trick-taking games.

==== Indicators ====
Some indicators that a hand may lend itself to dummy reversal are:

- shortness (singleton or void) in declarer's hand with length in the same suit in dummy
- loser(s) in declarer's hand that cannot be ruffed or discarded on a side suit
- adequate trump strength and length in dummy (typically a three or four card trump suit with at least two honors for drawing the final trumps)
- entries to dummy outside of the trump suit

==== Example ====
♠♤	AKJ	W E	♠♤	Q10853
♥	A854	W E	♥	6
♦	AK2	W E	♦	954
♣♧	A64	W E	♣♧	J853

East is in 4♠ and receives a trump lead. There are five trump tricks, three aces and king of diamonds off the top, but there is no tempo to ruff a club in dummy, as the defenders will deprive it of the trumps after they regain the lead in clubs. The solution is to ruff hearts in hand instead – in trick two, East plays ♥A, ruffs a heart, enters the dummy with ♣A, ruffs a heart, enters the dummy with ♦A and ruffs a heart. In this way, the declarer took three ruffs in hand, and still has two trumps in dummy to take care of opponents' trumps (assuming that they are divided 3-2, which is the most common division of five cards).

=== Ruffing finesse ===
A finesse is an attempt to take a trick with a card, not the highest in the suit, by taking advantage of the lie of the cards. At its simplest a ruffing finesse involves a high sequence (e.g. KQJ) opposite a void in the same suit. The K is led and partner is prepared to ruff if the intervening player plays the ace, or discard if the ace is not played. Repetition of this will avoid the loss of a trick to the ace, but it only works when the ace is on the right side (i.e. 50%)

=== Trump promotion ===
A technique where one side creates an otherwise non-existing trump trick by ruffing high knowing it will be over-ruffed or, in other situations, by refusing to over-ruff.

=== Uppercut ===
A play that involves one player ruffing high in the hope that an overruff by an opponent will result in the promotion of a trump card in partner's hand into a winner. This is a type of trump promotion.

=== Trump coup ===
A play that substitutes for a direct finesse in the trump suit because the hand required to lead has no trumps. At the point of execution it is important that the hand being finessed and the next hand have only trumps so that the hand being finessed is forced to trump, allowing the next hand to over-ruff. A trump reduction play is sometimes a necessary precursor to a trump coup.

=== Coup en passant ===
A play where a trump trick is "stolen" by taking the opportunity to ruff after the player who has the master trump. This is a type of indirect finesse.

=== Trump squeeze ===
A play involving a simple squeeze where a side suit presents a menace which can be established by ruffing.

=== Bridge strategies ===
Normal suit play in bridge (as opposed to the play at no trumps) revolves around the trump suit. Usually the declarer and dummy together will have the majority of trumps, as they chose the suit in which to play. Declarer will attempt to draw the opponents' trumps, leaving them with none. Declarer's remaining trumps ensure that the opponents cannot establish long cards, as they will just be trumped.

Although drawing the opponent's trumps is usually to be recommended, there are occasions when other strategies yield more tricks. One is crossruffing – drawing the opponents trumps in this case reduces the number of trumps (and hence tricks) for the crossruff. Another case is when after drawing one or two rounds of trumps the opponents are left with one master trump. In this case drawing it will use two of declarer's trumps for one of the opponents'. Unless entry problems are feared, it is usually better to let the opponents take their trump when they will.

It is important to realize that trumping in the hand with more trumps does not add tricks, as these are long cards that will win anyway. In order to gain tricks by trumping, the ruff has to be taken in the short hand, or enough ruffs must be made in the hand that was originally longer in trumps to make it shorter than the other hand (dummy reversal, described above).

== See also ==
- Glossary of card game terms
- Glossary of contract bridge terms
- Ruff and Honours, a 17th-century card game featuring a trump suit
