= Clyde E. Love =

American mathematician and author

Clyde Elton Love (December 12, 1882 – January 31, 1960) was an American contract bridge author and mathematics professor at the University of Michigan, Ann Arbor. He was a native of Bancroft, Michigan and graduated from the University of Michigan in 1905.

Love is well known in bridge circles for his 1959 book Bridge Squeezes Complete, one of the earliest efforts to codify then-existing squeeze play. Love established rules for recognizing bridge squeezes, and for executing them when they occurred. His system of classifying squeezes has been used by most bridge writers since. He was also the author of many magazine articles.

He died at his home in Ann Arbor, aged 77. He was survived by his wife and daughter.

== Bibliography ==
- Love, Clyde E. (1951). Squeeze Play in Bridge. New York: R. R. Smith. p. 183. LCCN 51010352.
- Love, Clyde E. (1959). Bridge Squeezes Complete or Winning End Play Strategy (1st ed.). Long Island City, NY: Barclay Bridge Supplies, Sterling Publishing Company Inc. LCCN 59014249.
- Love, Clyde E. (2010). Lee, Linda; Pottage, Julian (eds.). Bridge Squeezes Complete. Toronto: Master Point Press. ISBN 978-1-897106-58-7.
- Differential and Integral Calculus, 1916-1970
- Analytic Geometry, 1923-1955
- Elements of Analytic Geometry, 1931-1956
- On the Asymptotic Solutions of Linear Differential Equations, 1913-1914

== See also ==
- Squeeze plays in contract bridge
