= Master Point Press =

Canadian book publishing company

Master Point Press is a Canadian book publishing company located in Toronto, Ontario, Canada. It grew out of Canadian Master Point magazine (1992–1997), which was published by Ray and Linda Lee. The company began publishing books in 1994. While primarily interested in books on contract bridge, MPP also publishes books on other games and intellectual pursuits, such as chess.

Notable bridge players whose works have been published by Master Point Press include Michael Rosenberg, Larry Cohen, Edwin Kantar, Terence Reese, Barbara Seagram, and David Bird.

Master Point Press receives funding from the Government of Canada through the Book Publishing Industry Development Program (BPIDP) for their publishing activities. The company has been expanding its online presence with a blogging site, an ebook site and a resource for both bridge teachers and students.
