= Double squeeze =

Type of squeeze play in the card game of bridge

The double squeeze is a type of squeeze play in the card game of bridge.

Double squeezes are a combination of two simple squeezes carried out against both opponents. If both squeezes are executed by the same trick, that is the same squeeze card, the double squeeze is called simultaneous. If both opponents are squeezed on different tricks (the squeeze card is then a card in the suit that was menacing the opponent squeezed first) the double squeeze is called non-simultaneous.

As there are only four suits in contract bridge the two simple squeezes can only be combined by using a menace for both opponents, the squeeze card being in the fourth suit.

== Example ==
The following demonstrates the basics of a double squeeze; south requires the three remaining tricks.

		♠	A 2		
		♥	K		
		♦	—		
		♣	—		
♠	Q 3	N W E S		♠	K 9
♥	A	N W E S		♥	—
♦	—	N W E S		♦	Q
♣	—	N W E S		♣	—
South to play		♠	6		
South to play		♥	—		
South to play		♦	J		
South to play		♣	2		

When the South leads the ♣2 (the squeeze card), West must keep his ♥A (menaced by dummy's king) and gives up his spade guard (spades being the double menace). In the same trick (this is therefore a simultaneous double squeeze), East must keep his ♦Q (menaced by declarer's jack), and is forced to discard his low spade. Consequently, the ♠2 in North is established.

South completes the play by leading the ♠6 to the ♠A and wins the last trick with the ♠2.
