= Contract bridge diagram =

Card deal diagram for the game of contact bridge

Board 1 Matchpoints; South in 4 ♠ Not vulnerable		♠♤	9 7 4		
Board 1 Matchpoints; South in 4 ♠ Not vulnerable		♥	A 6 2		
Board 1 Matchpoints; South in 4 ♠ Not vulnerable		♦	A 10 4		
Board 1 Matchpoints; South in 4 ♠ Not vulnerable		♣♧	J 9 6 5		
♠♤	10 6	N W E S		♠♤	Q 9 5
♥	Q 9 8 5 3	N W E S		♥	K 4
♦	Q J 9 8 6 2	N W E S		♦	K 7 5
♣♧	—	N W E S		♣♧	Q 10 7 3 2
Lead: ♦Q		♠♤	A K J 3 2		
Lead: ♦Q		♥	J 10 4		
Lead: ♦Q		♦	3		
Lead: ♦Q		♣♧	A K 8 4		

A bridge diagram

Diagrams are used to illustrate a deal of 52 cards in four hands in the game of contract bridge. Each hand is designated by a point on the compass and so North–South are partners against East–West.

Suit features include:

- Each line represents a suit, indicated by its symbol – ♠ for spades, ♥ for hearts, ♦ for diamonds, and ♣ for clubs
- Each card in a suit is indicated by its abbreviation: 'A', 'K', 'Q', 'J', '10', '9', '8', '7', '6', '5', '4', '3', '2'
- Cards of higher rank are to the left of those of lower rank
- Smaller cards whose exact value is unimportant may be represented by an "x"
- Thin spacing or hair spacing between cards is optional but generally improves readability
- When one hand is void (i.e. has no cards) in a suit, it is usually denoted by a long dash (an emdash)

The full deal diagram is usually drawn with North at the top, with the other hands following their normal compass orientation. For convenience and consistency, South is usually declarer, so that the reader can see the hand as if playing it; exceptions to this rule can occur when reporting deals from actual matches, but even then the players' seats are often rotated to follow this convention.

The diagram may include additional information such as deal or board number, scoring method (Matchpoints, IMPs, etc.), the final contract, vulnerability and the opening lead.

Diagram variants may leave out one or more hands if irrelevant to the presentation. Partially played hands may be displayed to illustrate end-position play.
