= Entry (cards) =

Gaining the lead in a particular hand in a card game

An entry, in trick-taking card games such as bridge, is a means of gaining the lead in a particular hand, i.e. winning the trick in that hand. Gaining the lead when some other player (including one's partner) led to the previous trick is referred to as entering one's hand; a card that wins a trick to which another player made the lead (except to the last trick) is therefore known as an entry card.

== Example ==
♠	A K Q J 10 9
♥	4 3 2
♦	4 3 2
♣	2
N S
♠	—
♥	A K Q J 10 9
♦	A K 7 6 5
♣	A 3

If South declares this hand at notrump and the opening lead is a club, he will probably take just nine tricks with the top cards in his hand. Although the dummy holds the top six spades, they can win no tricks unless someone leads a spade; South has no spades, and so cannot do so and the opponents are unlikely to do so either. If South had just one spade (and one less card elsewhere), he could play it as a means of entering the North hand, enabling it to win six spades tricks.

On the same deal, if South declares with hearts as trump, he has a good chance of making 13 tricks on any lead. For example, if a club is led, he wins the ace in his hand, plays two rounds of trump and then leads the three of clubs which he ruffs in dummy - an entry play. Unless the defense can ruff one of the next three top spade leads from dummy, South's three small diamonds can be discarded on the three top spades. A diamond is subsequently lead from dummy to enter the South hand with the ace of diamonds, followed by the remaining trump and the king of diamonds.

== See also ==
- Endplay
