= Linda Lee (bridge) =

Canadian bridge player and publisher

Linda Marcia Lee (born 24 July 1947) is a Canadian bridge player and co-owner of Master Point Press, a publisher of books on bridge. After a lengthy absence from women's bridge, she won back-to-back Canadian Women's Teams titles in 2004 and 2005, and represented Canada in the Women's World Championship in both those years and in 2007. Lee is from Toronto, Ontario.

Lee is a World Bridge Federation (WBF) World International Master (WIM).

== Bridge contributions ==
Lee is a regular commentator on Bridge Base Online and she blogs regularly about bridge.

== Bridge accomplishments ==
=== Runners-up ===
- North American Bridge Championships (1)
  - Rockwell Mixed Pairs (1) 1992
