= Finesse =

Card playing technique

In contract bridge and similar games, a finesse is a type of card play technique which will enable a player to win an additional trick or tricks should there be a favorable position of one or more cards in the hands of the opponents.

The player attempts to win either the current trick or a later trick with a card of the suit he leads notwithstanding that the opponents hold a higher card in the suit; the attempt is based on the assumption that the higher card is held by a particular opponent. The specifics of the technique vary depending upon the suit combination being played and the number of tricks the player is attempting to win in that suit.

== Terminology ==
To finesse a card is to play that card.

♠ A Q

♠ 7 2

Thus, in the example, the Queen is finessed. The outstanding King is the card finessed against, or the card the player hopes to capture by the finessing maneuver. Thus, you finesse against a missing honor, but you finesse the card you yourself play, the card finessed being so played that it has a chance of winning against the missing higher card.

Related terms

A finesse is said to be onside or on if the finessable honor is favorably placed and offside or off if it is not.

Many finesses involve a tenace which is a combination of non-touching honors in the same hand, e.g. ♠AQ or ♥KJ.

The term hook is a colloquialism for finesse. Similarly, "in the slot" is a colloquialism for onside.

== Basic finesses ==
=== Direct finesse ===
A direct finesse is a finesse that gains a trick without losing one, as long as it is "on". For example:

♠ A Q

♠ 7 2

If South (declarer) is on lead he can lead to the queen; that is, he leads a small spade and, if West plays low, plays the queen from dummy. If West is holding the king (it is "onside"), North-South will win two tricks, for a gain of one trick without losing a trick. (If West actually plays the king on the first trick, of course, North-South win two tricks by covering with the ace.)

=== Indirect finesse ===
An indirect finesse is a finesse that gains a trick – if it is on – but may involve losing a trick first. A typical example is:

♠ K 7

♠ 6 3

South leads a spade toward the king; if West holds the ace, the king will either win the current trick or will become the highest remaining spade and win a later one. (More precisely, the king is set up as a winner, but that doesn't mean it will necessarily take a trick. It might be ruffed, or at No Trump the defense might run another suit for a squeeze and force it to be discarded. But this article is about finesses, and having acknowledged that such issues exist, we will ignore them henceforth.)

=== Double and triple finesse ===
A double finesse is a finesse against two honours held by the opponents. Sometimes it can gain two tricks:

♠ A Q 10

♠ 7 4 3

South leads a spade to the 10; if it holds, he reenters his hand via another suit and leads another spade to the queen; if the 10 loses and he subsequently regains the lead in his hand, he likewise leads another spade to the queen. North-South will take three spade tricks if West has both the king and the jack (probability about 25% in the absence of any information), two if East and West have one each (50%), but only one if East has both (25%).

Other times it can gain one trick:

♠ A J 10

♠ 7 4 3

South leads a spade to the 10. Assuming it loses, he reenters his hand and then leads another spade to the jack. North-South will take two spade tricks if West has either the king or the queen, or both (probability about 75% in the absence of any information), but only one if East has both (25%). However, this combination lends itself to an endplay - if one can be effected two tricks are guaranteed.

Similarly, a triple finesse is possible, and occasionally desirable, with a holding such as A-Q-10-8. This would be a low-probability desperation play if four tricks are needed in the suit, but two or three will probably be made.

=== Deep finesse ===
A deep finesse is a maneuver that allows additional tricks to be won, but only if two or more cards are favorably positioned.

♠ A K 10

♠ 7 4 3

In the first example at left, two honors are held by the opponents. South leads a spade and inserts the 10 if West plays low. South will gain a trick if both the queen and the jack are with West. Note that if there are no entries back to the South hand, West can assure himself one trick (provided he started with at least three spades) by splitting his honors and playing the queen or jack, on South's first lead. The deep finesse has an a priori probability of success of 25%.

♠ A Q 8 7

♠ 5 4 2

This second example is a deep finesse against three or more cards held by the opponents. South leads a spade, West follows with the 3 or 6, and then the 7 is played from dummy. In this situation, South does not expect the 7 to win the trick, although that is a distant possibility—the 7 will win if East has a singleton 6 or 3, which would mean that West has blundered by playing his lowest card. The more likely purpose of this play is to keep West off lead. The term deep finesse used in this context is descriptive, but also has a somewhat humorous and fatalistic connotation, the approximate meaning being "doomed finesse."

Deep Finesse is also the trade name of a commercially marketed computer program that performs double dummy analysis of bridge play problems.

=== Ruffing finesse ===
The ruffing finesse is a variation of a finesse in trump contracts where the finessing player chooses to ruff or not, rather than choosing which card to play from a tenace.

| ♠♤ | K Q J |
| ♥ | — |
| ♦ | — |
| ♣♧ | A |
N S
| ♠♤ | — |
| ♥ | 2 |
| ♦ | 3 2 |
| ♣♧ | 2 |

In this example, hearts are trumps and South's 2 is the last one remaining, and the lead is with North (dummy). Then North-South can take all tricks if East holds the ace of spades. A spade is led from the North hand; if East plays low, a diamond is discarded and the lead is repeated. If East never covers, North-South get three spade tricks and a trump. If East plays the ace, South trumps and leads a club to return to the dummy, which is high, so taking two spades, a trump, and a club trick.

== Special cases ==
=== Marked finesse ===
| | ♠ A 10 5 4 | |
| ♠ J 9 8 7 | W N↑ S↓ E | ♠ 6 |
| | ♠ K Q 3 2 | |

A marked finesse is one that cannot lose, because the opponents' honor is known to be onside. In the example at right, if South begins by leading the king-queen, he learns on the second trick that East has no more spades and so the finesse of the ten is proven.

=== Two-way finesse ===
A two-way finesse is a situation where one can finesse by leading from either hand toward the other.

♠ A 10 2

♠ K J 3

Start by playing the king of spades (or if in dummy, leading the 2 to the king) and then running the jack; this makes three spade tricks if East has the singleton queen or if West has the queen, and if that's not the case, then East will be on lead. Or start with the ace and 10, making three tricks in the opposite situation, or leaving West on lead. The decision of which way to finesse might be based on which opponent is more likely to have the queen, or on which opponent it would be safer to give the lead to, if need be. And there is always the option of not finessing at all.

This holding similarly presents a two-way finesse, but along with a suitable entry it will always produce 5 spade tricks no matter how the opponents' spades are placed.

♠ A K 10 3

♠ Q 9 5 4 2

Play the ace on the first spade trick. If both opponents follow suit, the jack must drop and no finesse will be needed; if one opponent shows out, there is a marked finesse available against the other. For example, if East shows out, a small spade is played to the queen, and the K and 10 score via the marked finesse; finally the South hand is entered in another suit and the 13th spade is cashed (or if spades are trump, used for a ruff).

But weaken the holding slightly and the finesse is no longer two-way:

♠ A K 8 3

♠ Q 9 5 4 2

Now the opponents have the jack and 10. Here, if entry considerations permit, the queen must be played first to discover if the spades split 4-0. Then, if they are 3-1, the play goes as before.

But if the spades split 4-0, someone has ♠J1076. If East holds all four outstanding spades, there is nothing to be done; East must take a spade trick. But if West has all four spades, declarer can still take 5 tricks: after East shows out on the lead of the queen, a small spade is led toward dummy for a deep finesse.

The point is that if an opponent might hold two minor honors, such as the jack and 10 here, declarer should not weaken a two-honor holding before it's clear how to use it. In this example, nothing is lost by cashing the queen first, because declarer can never cope with those four spades in East's hand. But declarer can cope with four spades in the West hand, so long as the A-K is retained over West's holding until West has played to the second spade trick.

=== Two-way position with a ruffing finesse ===
As noted above, a ruffing finesse is "on" if the opponents' critical honor is positioned after yours, the reverse of an ordinary finesse. Consequently, there is a form of two-way finesse where a ruffing finesse can be taken against one opponent or an ordinary finesse against the other. If there is no other reason to choose one play or the other, the ruffing finesse may be a superior alternative because it allows leading high and retain the lead. For example:

| ♠♤ | A Q J 5 | W E | ♠♤ | 3 |
| ♥ | K 6 5 4 | W E | ♥ | A 7 3 2 |
| ♦ | A 7 5 | W E | ♦ | 9 6 3 |
| ♣♧ | 6 5 | W E | ♣♧ | A K 9 4 2 |

East plays a contract of 4 hearts. After the opening lead of a diamond, he wins the ace and plays the two top trumps; they break 3-2. He leads a spade to the queen, but the finesse is off, and the opponents now cash two diamonds. With a trump still to lose, the contract appears to be down one.

However, the contract is cold as long as trumps break 3-2 and the defense cannot get an early ruff. The correct play is to win the ace of diamonds and to continue with the ace of spades, followed by the queen for a ruffing finesse. If North does not cover with the king, declarer pitches a losing diamond. If North does play the king, declarer ruffs and later pitches a diamond on the jack of spades. Even if the king is with South, declarer loses 3 tricks only, if trumps are 3-2. And if trumps are 4-1 the game will still make if the king of spades is sitting with North. The advantage of the ruffing finesse over the ordinary finesse here is the gain of tempo if it loses.

=== Ann Gallagher finesse ===
An Ann Gallagher finesse is a special sort of two-way finesse. Instead of deciding which way to finesse, though, declarer finesses both ways. This is the classic example:

| South in 4♥ | | ♠♤ | A | | |
| South in 4♥ | | ♥ | K 3 2 | | |
| South in 4♥ | | ♦ | K 7 6 5 | | |
| South in 4♥ | | ♣♧ | A K Q J 2 | | |
| ♠♤ | K Q J 10 9 | N W E S | | ♠♤ | 4 3 2 |
| ♥ | Q 7 5 4 | N W E S | | ♥ | 6 |
| ♦ | 10 4 | N W E S | | ♦ | A Q J 9 8 3 |
| ♣♧ | 4 3 | N W E S | | ♣♧ | 9 8 7 |
| Lead: ♠K | | ♠♤ | 8 7 6 5 | | |
| Lead: ♠K | | ♥ | A J 10 9 8 | | |
| Lead: ♠K | | ♦ | 2 | | |
| Lead: ♠K | | ♣♧ | 10 6 5 | | |

Against South's 4♥ contract, West leads the ♠K, removing an entry that might have proven useful later. South leads the ♥2 from dummy and finesses the ♥J. West can see that, with the clubs probably running, South will have no problem if West wins his ♥Q. So West ducks smoothly.

A trusting player sitting South would now lead the ♥8 to the ♥K, preparing to finesse East again for the ♥Q, but East's discard would come as a shock. After taking the ♥K, South can't knock out West's ♥Q without allowing the defense to take at least two spades, a heart and a diamond.

After the ♥J wins at trick 2, South's only correct play is to finesse West for the ♥Q, even though he has apparently and successfully finessed East for the same card. The point is to guard against West's clever holdup.

The reason for the term Ann Gallagher finesse is found in a New York Times article. Ann Gallagher was a movie actress in the 1930s. She enjoyed bridge, and when she won a two-way finesse she would repeat it in the opposite direction, saying "Now let's see if I'm really lucky."

=== Free finesse ===
A so-called free finesse is not technically a finesse at all, as it is not dependent on the position of the opponents' cards, but only on their choice of lead. A free finesse occurs when an opponent leads a suit, so that the hand containing a tenace position plays last to the trick. In the first example:

♠ A Q

♠ 7 2

the normal finesse only works if West has the king, but if East leads spades, the declarer simply plays the lowest card that will win the trick, and so gets two tricks no matter whether East or West has the king. Similarly, in the first two-way finesse example, three spade tricks are taken automatically on a free finesse if either East or West is the first to lead spades.

Free finesses often happen due to the defense guessing wrong about high cards in declarer's hand, especially on the opening lead. But it is also possible to force the defense to give you a free finesse, by endplaying them. Consider the two-way finesse example again, but with an additional card:

| ♠♤ | A J 2 |
| ♥ | 2 |
| ♦ | — |
| ♣♧ | — |
N S
| ♠♤ | K 10 3 |
| ♥ | 3 |
| ♦ | — |
| ♣♧ | — |

Nobody has played any spades at any point, so the defense is known to have 7 of them, and their other card is known to be a heart. Declarer leads a heart, losing to whichever defender holds the high heart; and that defender is now on lead with nothing but spades. North-South will take 3 spade tricks for certain, and declarer need not guess which way to finesse the suit.

=== Entry finesse ===
At times, declarer needs to reach the same hand twice using a particular suit, but that hand doesn't hold the suit's two top cards.

♠ A J

♠ K 10

In this example, declarer needs to reach the North hand twice by means of the spade suit.

Normally, declarer would cash the ♠A and ♠K separately. However, two spade entries to North might be needed, for reasons such as setting up North's side suit or preparing an endplay. If West holds the ♠Q, declarer can reach dummy twice with an entry finesse: lead the ♠10 from hand and finesse the ♠J. If the ♠J holds, the ♠K can later be overtaken by the ♠A for the second entry to dummy. If West is aware of what's going on, though, he can stop it by covering the ♠10 with the ♠Q. Now the suit is blocked, because the ♠J cannot overtake the ♠K. As with many deceptive plays, declarer should take the entry finesse as early in the play as possible, before the defense realizes it must play second hand high to block the suit.

== Complex finesses ==
Some positions require correct reading of opponent's holding, and involve a combination of basic finesses with other techniques, such as dropping or pinning opponent's honors.

=== Backward finesse ===
In the backward finesse, the player attempts to force out a higher card in a suit by means of a high-leading finesse, and then finesses against a lower card in the suit.

| | ♠ A 6 4 | |
| ♠ Q 8 2 | W N↑ S↓ E | ♠ 10 7 5 3 |
| | ♠ K J 9 | |

In the example on the right, the standard play would be to finesse East for the queen, either before or after cashing dummy's ace. Instead, in the backward finesse South, begins by leading the jack from hand and passes it if West plays low thereby scoring all three tricks in the suit. But if West covers the jack with the queen, South takes the trick with the ace and then leads the 4 from dummy and finesses East for the 10, again winning all three tricks.

There are three reasons that South might choose to play this way, rather than taking the normal course of finessing East for the queen:

- South might expect West to hold the queen because of the bidding or some similar clue.
- South might want to make an avoidance play, so as to keep West off lead.
- South might be shooting, hoping to score well by adopting a line of play that other declarers will not take.

=== Intra-finesse ===
Finesses which involve a second-round drop or pin are sometimes referred to as "intra-finesses".

| | ♠ J 7 5 2 | |
| ♠ Q 8 | W N↑ S↓ E | ♠ K 9 6 |
| | ♠ A 10 4 3 | |

| | ♠ J 7 5 2 | |
| ♠ Q 8 6 | W N↑ S↓ E | ♠ K 9 |
| | ♠ A 10 4 3 | |

| | ♠ A 9 5 | |
| ♠ J 7 | W N↑ S↓ E | ♠ Q 10 4 3 |
| | ♠ K 8 6 2 | |

In the first diagram, the declarer must lead a small card from hand towards the dummy's jack for an "indirect" finesse. If West plays the queen, East's king can be finessed against in the next round. If West ducks, the declarer will drop the queen by playing the ace. In the second, the declarer must lead a small card from dummy and play the 10 if East plays low. In the second round, the ace will drop the king.

In these and similar cases, declarer's first play must be a low card through the hand with two cards; thus, he must guess the position to collect three tricks in the suit.

In the third diagram where declarer also requires three spade tricks, he must first lead low to the dummy's 9, losing to East's 10. Next, the ace drops the jack, and leaves a simple-finesse position against East's queen in the third round. Note that this maneuver will work with any doubleton honor with West, but will cost if West holds QJx, Q10x, or J10x

== Pseudo-finesse ==
A pseudo or "Chinese" finesse presents a declarer's deceptive move to fake a high-leading finesse by leading an unprotected honor, hoping that the defender will misread the situation.

| | ♠ A 7 4 3 | |
| ♠ K 6 5 | W N↑ S↓ E | ♠ 10 8 2 |
| | ♠ Q J 9 | |

Consider the legitimate finesse situation at left:

If South leads the queen first, and West covers, the declarer will be able to subsequently finesse against East's ten, losing no tricks in the suit. Thus, West should withhold the king for one round.

| | ♠ A 7 4 3 | |
| ♠ K 6 5 | W N↑ S↓ E | ♠ J 10 9 |
| | ♠ Q 8 2 | |

However, in the alternative situation:

If South leads the queen and West ducks, the declarer will lose only one trick in the suit instead of two.

== Coups involving a finesse ==
=== Bath coup ===
This specific case of a free finesse is important enough to have its own name (after the city of Bath in England). It occurs when the declarer holds a suit headed by A-J-x and the left-hand opponent leads the king or queen of the suit. If the declarer ducks and the opponent now repeats the lead, two tricks will be won with the ace-jack.

The Bath coup is not just a deceptive play. Even if the suit is not continued, the declarer gains a tempo, since he still has a sure stopper in that suit.

=== Trump coup and coup en passant ===
In positions where a finesse in trumps cannot be taken because the hand that would need to lead trumps has none, a trump coup or coup en passant may be used. See those articles.

== Suit combinations ==
The Official Encyclopedia of Bridge lists suit combinations and how best to play them depending on how many tricks are needed. Players do not need to memorize these and can usually deduce the correct play at the table. However, it is worthwhile to study the suit combinations tables, having in mind that the optimal play in a suit may not be best in the context of the entire hand.
