= Endplay =

Game mechanics of bridge

An endplay (also throw-in), in bridge and similar games, is a tactical play where a defender is put on lead at a strategic moment, and then has to make a play that loses one or more tricks. Most commonly the losing play either constitutes a free finesse, or else it gives declarer a ruff and discard. In a case where declarer has no entries to dummy (or to his own hand), the defender may also be endplayed into leading a suit which can be won in that hand.

== Example ==
♠	A 9 8 5 3 2
♥	K J 5 4
♦	4
♣	K 4
N S
♠	K 7 6 4
♥	A 10 9
♦	A 8 7
♣	A Q 9

For example, South is declarer in 6♠ and West leads the diamond king. If the adverse spades are divided 2-1, there are 12 certain tricks (six spade tricks, two hearts, one diamond and three clubs) and the possibility of a 13th by correctly guessing the two-way finesse (or dropping the queen) in hearts. But if the spades are 3-0, declarer will need an endplay to avoid the heart guess.

He should start by winning the diamond ace and ruffing a diamond in dummy, then cash the spade ace and spade king. If this reveals a 3-0 trump split, he now ruffs another diamond in dummy. If this is not overruffed, the contract is now assured.

Declarer's now plays the king, ace, and queen of clubs, discarding a heart from dummy to reach the end position shown below:

♠	9 8
♥	K J 5
♦	—
♣	—
N S
♠	7 6
♥	A 10 9
♦	—
♣	—

Declarer exits with a spade, and whoever wins is endplayed. If the defender leads a heart, North-South must make three heart tricks; if a club or diamond, declarer will ruff in one hand and discard a heart from the other, making an extra trump trick. Alternatively, if the defender has fewer than three clubs and chooses to ruff before the above position is reached, he is likewise endplayed, having to lead a heart or a diamond.

== Combining Endplay and Squeeze ==
A strip squeeze is a particular kind of squeeze that is based on endplaying the squeezed defender.
