= Simple squeeze =

Most basic form of a squeeze in contract bridge

The simple squeeze is the most basic form of a squeeze in contract bridge. When declarer plays a winner in one suit (the squeeze card), an opponent is forced to discard a stopper in one of declarer's two threat suits.

The simple squeeze takes place against one opponent only and gains one trick only. That opponent must hold the defense's only stoppers in declarer's two threat suits. The simple squeeze requires that declarer has rectified the count: declarer must have already lost as many tricks as he can afford, and can win all but one of the remaining tricks with top cards. Positional squeezes, described next, also require that the defense's stoppers be located favorably for declarer. Other requirements are also discussed in this article.

== Positional squeezes ==
Example 1		♠	A J
Example 1		♥	K
Example 1		♦	—
Example 1		♣	—
♠	K Q	N W S	
♥	A	N W S	
♦	—	N W S	
♣	—	N W S	
South to lead		♠	4
South to lead		♥	2
South to lead		♦	—
South to lead		♣	A

♠	A J	Example 2 South to lead	
♥	K	Example 2 South to lead	
♦	—	Example 2 South to lead	
♣	—	Example 2 South to lead	
N E S		♠	K Q
N E S		♥	A
N E S		♦	—
N E S		♣	—
♠	4		
♥	2		
♦	—		
♣	A		

In Example 1, when the ♣A is cashed, West is squeezed in the major suits. West must discard before North plays. If West discards a spade, dummy discards the ♥K and declarer then wins the ♠AJ. If West discards the ♥A, dummy discards the ♠J and declarer then wins the ♠A and the ♥K.

The squeeze will not work if East's and West's cards are swapped as shown in Example 2. Here East can wait to see which threat card is played on the ♣A and discard accordingly; if declarer throws the ♠J, East discards a spade, and if declarer throws the ♥K, East discards the ♥A. (This example assumes that West holds at least one heart after following to the ♣A; else, South's ♥2 becomes a legitimate threat and the squeeze is automatic—see the next examples.)

The positional squeeze, is so called because its success depends on the position of the threats ♥K and ♠J relative to the defense's stoppers, the ♠KQ and the ♥A. Either the ♥K or ♠J, or both, must be in the upper hand: the hand that plays after the squeezed defender.

== Automatic squeezes ==
Example 3		♠	A J
Example 3		♥	2
Example 3		♦	—
Example 3		♣	—
♠	K Q	N W S	
♥	A	N W S	
♦	—	N W S	
♣	—	N W S	
South to lead		♠	4
South to lead		♥	K
South to lead		♦	—
South to lead		♣	A

♠	A J	Example 4 South to lead	
♥	2	Example 4 South to lead	
♦	—	Example 4 South to lead	
♣	—	Example 4 South to lead	
N E S		♠	K Q
N E S		♥	A
N E S		♦	—
N E S		♣	—
♠	4		
♥	K		
♦	—		
♣	A		

The positional squeeze which works against one defender only can be distinguished from the automatic squeeze, which works against either defender.

Consider the layout in Example 3, where the ♠J and the ♥K are divided between declarer and dummy. When South leads the squeeze card, the ♣A, West is squeezed. If West discards a spade, dummy throws the ♥2 and declarer then wins dummy's ♠AJ. If West discards the ♥A, dummy throws the ♠J and declarer then wins the ♥K and dummy's ♠A.

If the defense's stoppers are in the East hand instead of the West hand and the North-South hands are unchanged as in Example 4, then when declarer leads the ♣A and dummy discards the ♥2, East is squeezed. If East discards a spade, declarer then wins dummy's ♠AJ. If East discards the ♥A, declarer then wins the ♥K and dummy's ♠A.

This is still a simple squeeze, but it is termed an automatic squeeze to distinguish it from a positional squeeze. The fact that declarer's two threats are in different hands means that no matter which defender holds both stoppers, at least one of the threats lies in the upper hand (the ♠J if West is to be squeezed, the ♥K if East is to be squeezed).

== Entries ==
A successful simple squeeze poses several requirements. The count must be rectified, the defense's stoppers in the threat suits must be held by one opponent only, at least one threat card must lie over the squeezed defender, and at least one threat must lie opposite the squeeze card. In addition to these requirements, one of three general types of entry positions must be present.

=== The threat opposite the squeeze card has an entry in its own suit ===
Example 1		♠	A J
Example 1		♥	K
Example 1		♦	—
Example 1		♣	—
♠	K Q	N W S	
♥	A	N W S	
♦	—	N W S	
♣	—	N W S	
South to lead		♠	4
South to lead		♥	2
South to lead		♦	—
South to lead		♣	A

♠	A J	Example 4 South to lead	
♥	2	Example 4 South to lead	
♦	—	Example 4 South to lead	
♣	—	Example 4 South to lead	
N E S		♠	K Q
N E S		♥	A
N E S		♦	—
N E S		♣	—
♠	4		
♥	K		
♦	—		
♣	A		

Earlier, Examples 1 and 4, illustrated positional and automatic squeezes; here, they also illustrate one way to satisfy a simple squeeze's entry requirement.

One of the threat cards is the ♠J. It lies opposite the squeeze card (the ♣A), and it is accompanied by an entry (the ♠A) in its own suit. The hand containing the squeeze card must of course have another card (here, the ♠4) that can be used to cross to the ♠A after the squeeze has taken place.

=== Split two-card threat and twin-entry threat ===
Another entry position in the simple squeeze gives dummy, for example, an immediate winner and a small card in declarer's threat suit. This position is termed a split two-card threat or split two-card menace. The split two-card threat "splits" the threat between declarer's hand and dummy.

Example 5		♠	A 3
Example 5		♥	K
Example 5		♦	—
Example 5		♣	—
♠	K Q	N W S	
♥	A	N W S	
♦	—	N W S	
♣	—	N W S	
South to lead		♠	J 2
South to lead		♥	—
South to lead		♦	—
South to lead		♣	A

♠	A 3	Example 6 South to lead	
♥	K	Example 6 South to lead	
♦	—	Example 6 South to lead	
♣	—	Example 6 South to lead	
N E S		♠	K Q
N E S		♥	A
N E S		♦	—
N E S		♣	—
♠	J 2		
♥	—		
♦	—		
♣	A		

In Example 5, the spade threat is the ♠J. The split two-card threat splits the spade threat's immediate winner, the ♠A, from the threat itself. Dummy holds an immediate winner in the suit where declarer holds the threat.

When the squeeze card, the ♣A, is played, West might discard the ♥A. Then dummy throws the ♠3 and cashes the ♠A and the ♥K. If West discards the ♠Q instead, dummy throws the ♥K. South plays the ♠2 to the ♠A, removing West's remaining ♠K, and takes the last trick with the ♠J.

Notice that the simple squeeze with a split two-card menace is a positional squeeze. It will not operate against East if West's cards in Example 5 are transferred to East, as in Example 6. In Example 6, the split two-card menace is still present but if dummy discards the ♠3 on the ♣A, East discards the ♠Q and declarer must still lose to the ♥A. If dummy instead discards the ♥K, East throws the ♥A and declarer must still lose to the ♠K.

♠	A 3	Example 7 South to lead	
♥	K	Example 7 South to lead	
♦	—	Example 7 South to lead	
♣	2	Example 7 South to lead	
N E S		♠	Q J 10
N E S		♥	A
N E S		♦	—
N E S		♣	—
♠	K 9 2		
♥	—		
♦	—		
♣	A		

The problem in Example 6 is that declarer does not hold an entry to the ♠J threat after playing the squeeze card. The twin-entry threat converts the positional split-threat squeeze to an automatic squeeze. See Example 7.

Dummy holds winner-and-small in declarer's threat suit, as with the split two-card menace in Examples 5 and 6, but now declarer also has a winner (the ♠K) in that threat suit. This is a twin-entry squeeze and is automatic: with these cards in North and South, either West or East could be squeezed.

In Example 7, declarer leads ♣A and dummy follows suit. If East discards a spade, declarer wins the ♠A, the ♠K and the ♠9. If East discards the ♥A, declarer wins the ♠K, the ♠A and the ♥K. The same sequence occurs if West instead of East holds the guards in spades and hearts.

=== The criss-cross squeeze ===
The third general type of entry position in the simple squeeze occurs when declarer has an entry in dummy's threat suit and dummy has an entry in declarer's threat suit. This situation is termed a criss-cross squeeze. It is regarded as a comparatively rare position.

♠	A	Example 8 South to lead	
♥	Q 2	Example 8 South to lead	
♦	—	Example 8 South to lead	
♣	2	Example 8 South to lead	
N E S		♠	K 3
N E S		♥	K 3
N E S		♦	—
N E S		♣	—
♠	Q 2		
♥	A		
♦	—		
♣	A		

♠	A	Example 9 South to lead	
♥	Q 2	Example 9 South to lead	
♦	—	Example 9 South to lead	
♣	2	Example 9 South to lead	
N E S		♠	K
N E S		♥	K 4 3
N E S		♦	—
N E S		♣	—
♠	Q 2		
♥	A		
♦	—		
♣	A		

Example 8 illustrates the criss-cross squeeze. Dummy's threat card is the ♥Q and declarer has an entry, the ♥A, in that suit. Declarer's threat card is the ♠Q and dummy has an entry, the ♠A, in that suit. When declarer cashes the ♣A, East is squeezed. South cashes the A in whichever suit East discards from, crosses to the other A, and cashes the remaining Q.

This is an automatic squeeze: it works regardless of which opponent guards the two threats. However, the position is usually ambiguous. After the squeeze has taken place, declarer is often uncertain which guard (in Example 8, the ♠K and the ♥K) is now a singleton.

For example, if East unguarded the ♠K earlier in the play, the situation might actually be as shown in Example 9. In this case, declarer cashes the ♣A and East throws a small heart. If declarer now judges that East has bared the ♥K, he will cash the ♥A. When the ♥K does not fall, declarer will subsequently be stuck in dummy, losing the final trick to the ♥K. A similar outcome can result if East bares the ♥K early in the play.

The possibility of this sort of ambiguity is inherent in the blocked entry position that characterizes criss-cross squeezes. A defender who can see what's coming can discard deceptively, putting declarer to a guess after the squeeze has matured.

== The Vienna coup ==
♠	A J	Example 10; South to lead	
♥	A	Example 10; South to lead	
♦	2	Example 10; South to lead	
♣	—	Example 10; South to lead	
N E S		♠	K Q
N E S		♥	K 3
N E S		♦	—
N E S		♣	—
♠	2		
♥	Q 2		
♦	A		
♣	—		

♠	A J	Example 11; North to lead	
♥	—	Example 11; North to lead	
♦	2	Example 11; North to lead	
♣	—	Example 11; North to lead	
N E S		♠	K Q
N E S		♥	K
N E S		♦	—
N E S		♣	—
♠	2		
♥	Q		
♦	A		
♣	—		

One particular entry configuration may require special handling. In the layout shown in Example 10, the threats (♠J and ♥Q) are divided between the North and South hands and East holds the guards in the threat suits. Furthermore, North holds a winner in each threat suit and South holds no winner in either threat suit.

Suppose that South leads the squeeze card, the ♦A, in the position shown. East simply discards either heart, because the South hand can neither retain nor regain the lead, and the North hand must eventually lose the ♠J to the ♠K.

The solution is to unblock the ♥A before leading to the ♦A. After the unblock, the position is as shown in Example 11. The unblock of the ♥A transposes Example 10 into Example 11, a simple automatic squeeze with the ♥Q positioned to exert pressure against East. Compare Example 11 with Example 4, which shows the same basic position.

The unblocking solution remains the same even if the East and West hands were interchanged.

The play, prior to the squeeze card, of the winner that blocks South's threat is called the Vienna coup. The term has long been regarded as unduly connoting brilliance: "In short, the aura of glamor which has always seemed to surround this play is wholly fictitious."
