= List of bidding systems =

This is a list of bidding systems used in contract bridge. Systems listed have either had a historical impact on the development of bidding in the game or have been or are currently being used at the national or international levels of competition.

Bidding systems are characterized as belonging to one of two broadly defined categories:

- natural bidding systems and
- artificial bidding systems.

Nevertheless, each contains elements of the other given the number and variety of treatments and conventions that have been developed by bridge bidding theorists.

== Natural four card majors systems ==
- 5-4-4-3 System
- Acol
- Baron, an English system developed in the 1940s by Leo Baron, Adam Meredith and others.
- CAB, acronym for Two Clubs, Ace-asking and Blackwood
- Canapé
- Colonial Acol
- Culbertson
- EFOS, the Economical Forcing System developed by Eric Jannersten and others in Sweden in the sixties and seventies
- EHAA, acronym for Every Hand An Adventure
- Four Aces Team
- Goren
- Nordic
- Official System
- Reith One-over-one

== Natural five card majors systems ==
- 2/1 game forcing
- 5-5-4-2 System
- 5-5-5-1 System
- Aces Scientific
- Alpha
- Bridge World Standard
- Eastern Scientific
- Five Card Majors
- Kaplan–Sheinwold
- Majeure Cinquième
- Romex
- Roth–Stone
- Standard American
- Western Scientific

== Strong club systems ==
- Blue Club
- Black Club
- Canary Club
- Carrot Club
- French Club
- Hybrid Club
- Icelandic Precision
- Modified Italian Canape System (MICS), constructed and published by Ken Rexford
- Moscito
- Neapolitan Club
- Nottingham Club
- Power Precision Club
- Precision Club
- Schenken Big Club
- Simplified Precision
- Super Precision Club
- Ultimate Club
- Vanderbilt Club

== Artificial one club systems ==
- Betangina
- Bissell
- Lea System
- Little Roman Club
- Polish Club
- Power Club
- Roman Club
- Swedish Club
- Trefle Squeeze
- Vienna
- Vision Categoria:Sistema Vision

== Strong diamond systems ==
- Big Diamond
- Quadri Italia
- Magic Diamond
- Leghorn Diamond (Livorno)
- Mirror Diamond
- CS System

== Weak opening systems ==
- Carrotti
- Delta
- No Name
- Regres
- Säffle Spade, a forcing Pass system

== Artificial systems ==
- HUM Systems
- Little Major
- Marmic
- Relay Systems

== Losing trick count systems ==
- Imperspicuity

== Other systems ==
- Amsterdam Club
- Bangkok Club
- Churchill Style
- Crane
- Dutch Spade
- Fiori Romano
- Kamikaze Notrump
- Monaco
- New South Wales
- Orange Club
- Pro System
- Simplified Club
- Sims
- Stone Age Acol With Pakistani Preempts
- Symmetric Relay
- Tokyo Standard Goulash Bidding
- Ultimate Club
- Walsh
- Winslow
- MMMMajor Bridge Bidding System
