= Asking bid =

Technique used in a card game

In contract bridge, an asking bid is a convention used to seek a slam accurately. There are two types - suit asking bids and notrump asking bids. Constructed by bridge pioneer Ely Culbertson in the 1940s, they have been superseded by other methods; however, one remaining commonly used asking bid is the 5NT Grand slam force.

The application of asking bids requires making distinctions between the asking suit, the agreed trump and the two remaining side suits. Replies by partner are in accordance with a schedule of defined meanings.

== Definition ==
First there has to be an agreed trump suit. The trump agreement can be done explicit as well as implicit. Thereafter the first asking bid has to be either a double jump in a new suit not bid by the partner or the one who puts the asking bid forward, or (without a jump) at the fourth level. After an asking bid, the one who has put the first asking bid forward, will be like the Captain of a ship, and his partner has to reply to the questions. Only bids in the agreed trump can abort a series of asking bids.

Examples: After an opening of 1 ♠, partner's reply 3 ♠ establishes ♠ as trump. (explicit agreement) The bids 4 ♣, 4 ♦ and 4 ♥ are now asking bids. But also after a 1 ♥ opening, any double jump in a new suit is an asking bid, and ♥ agreed trump (implicit agreement). After a 1♥ opening, 3 ♠, 4 ♣ and 4 ♦ are Asking bids. If 4 NT is bid before an asking bid has been put forward this will then be interpreted as Blackwood (or one of its more modern versions). But 4 NT is no longer a matter of the number of Aces, if 4NT follows after an asking bid.

The first asking bid is a question related to first and second controls. It is hence important to understand the definitions of the controls.

Defintition of first and second controls:

- A first control equals a void or an Ace, with exception of trump, in which only the Ace counts as a first control, naturally.
- A second control equals any singleton (including a King) or a two card or longer suit with a Queen-guarded King. For instance King-Jack high isn't a sufficient second control (unless in a long suit), but King - Queen is a second control independent of the suit length. Also, a void can be both a first and a second control, but here the number of trump cards might be an issue.

Also third controls can be of importance.

- A third control is usually about a doubleton, but can also be Queen guarded with a Jack and one card more. And possibly a void with many trumps on own hand. King-Queen in a doubleton with at least four trumps also is a third control (second and third control). This is not the case with a third card in the suit (unless the Jack).

What's the significance of an Asking Bid ? The first asking bid, equals the following question - "Do you have the first control in this suit ? Or if not, do you have the second control in this suit and one (or more) first control(s) in other suit(s) ?"

Another asking bid (in a different suit), has exactly the same significance (but from a different perspective).

Example: West opens 1 ♠, and East holds this hand: ♠ Q J 9 7 3 ♥— ♦ A J 10 9 ♣ J 6 3 2

1 ♠ - 3 ♠ (explicit trump agreement)
4 ♣ - 4 ♠ (West wishes to get knowledge of East's possible controls, beginning with ♣. East must give a negative reply - trump lowest)
5 ♦ - 5 ♥ (However as West now asks in ♦, with Ace of ♦ East can now reveal the void in ♥)
6 ♠ - pass (A sound conclusion for West, provided the trump Ace and King, the King of ♦ and Ace or King of ♣ sits on West's hand.)

But if repeating the first asking suit, then the second asking bid equals the following question - "Do you (also) have the second control in this suit ? Or if not, do you have an even better control in this suit and one (or more) second control(s) in other suit(s) ?"

Example with the same hand (West opens and East replies):
1 ♠ - 3 ♠ (explicit trump agreement)
4 ♦ - 4 ♥ (West wishes to get knowledge of East's possible controls, beginning with ♦. With Ace of ♦, East can now reveal the void in ♥)
5 ♦ - 5 ♠ (West now asks in ♦ a second time, a repeated asking bid. East now has to have both top cards in ♦ in order to show also a second control ♥. With five trumps that would have been possible otherwise, but 5♥ would now be a lie - due to the lack of King of ♦.)
pass

Further Asking bids If the reply to the first asking bid allows 4 NT to be bid, a 4NT-bid then is asking for the number of Trump-top controls, the Ace, King and Queens of the agreed trump. And partner replies 5 ♣ = I have none of these three cards, 5 ♦ = 1 such card, 5 ♥ = 2, 5 ♠ = all three. If the bidding has passed 4 NT, this bid can instead be bid as 5 NT. (Which indeed equals the modern Grand slam force). But if this has been possible to bid already, at one level lower, then will 5 NT instead ask for Trump-excess, or the number of trump cards that so far has not been possible to show.

An asking bid in another suit can also follow. Then it's called "a second asking bid". Asking in the same suit twice is called "a repeated asking bid" however. And this is different from a new asking bid.

== Example and replies ==
Example:

Auction:
1♥ - pass - 3♥- pass
4♣ ? - pass - Reply in table below

Asking suit ( ♣ )	Trump suit ( ♥ )	Side suit ( ♦ & ♠ )	Reply	in this example
not even 2nd control	insignificant	insignificant	Trump, lowest	4♥
With second control in asking suit
2nd without any other 1st	not the Ace	no Ace(s)/void	Trump, lowest	4♥
Constructive replies
2nd	Ace	no Ace(s)/void	Trump jump	5♥
2nd	not the Ace	one void	void suit	4♦ / 4♠
2nd	not the Ace	one Ace	Ace suit	4♦ / 4♠
2nd	Ace	a void	side suit void	4♦ / 4♠
2nd	Ace	one Ace	4NT = 2 Aces, always	4 NT
2nd	not the Ace	one Ace + a void	suit of the Ace	4♦ / 4♠
2nd	not the Ace	both Aces	4NT = 2 Aces, always	4 NT
2nd	Ace	one Ace + a void	4NT = 2 Aces, always	4 NT
2nd	Ace	both Aces	5NT = at least 3 Aces, always	5 NT
With first control in asking suit
void	not the Ace	no Ace(s)	raise asking suit	5♣
void	not the Ace	one Ace	side suit Ace	4♦ / 4♠
void	Ace	no Ace(s)	Trump jump	5♥
void	Ace	one Ace	4NT = 2 Aces, always	4 NT
void	not the Ace	both Aces	4NT = 2 Aces, always	4 NT
void	Ace	both Aces	5NT = at least 3 Aces, always	5 NT
Ace	not the Ace	no Ace(s)/void	raise asking suit	5♣
Ace	not the Ace	one Ace	4NT = 2 Aces, always	4 NT
Ace	not the Ace	a void	side suit void	4♦ / 4♠
Ace	not the Ace	one Ace + void	4NT = 2 Aces, always	4 NT
Ace	not the Ace	both Aces	5NT = at least 3 Aces, always	5 NT
Ace	Ace	no Ace(s)/void	4NT = 2 Aces, always	4 NT
Ace	Ace	a void	4NT = 2 Aces, always	4 NT
Ace	Ace	one Ace	5NT = at least 3 Aces, always	5 NT
Ace	Ace	one Ace + void	5NT = at least 3 Aces, always	5 NT
Ace	Ace	both Aces	5NT = at least 3 Aces, always	5 NT

Hands with two voids are not taken in consideration. Presumably not by Culbertson, certainly not in the source.

The basic principles are -

1. Without even the second control in the asking suit, reply negatively - logically trump at lowest level. This applies completely to the situation in the trump and side colors.
2. Also with a second control in the asking suit, but no other first control, reply negatively - logically trump at lowest level.
3. If the requirements of either a first control in the asking suit - or at least a second control in the asking suit combined with one or more first controls in Trump and the side suits are met, then reply constructively.

The constructive replies:

1. With just one first control, this should be shown. Question suit raise, trump raise or a bid in the side suits. (Do not forget to have at least the second control in the asking suit - without a such, constructive bids are not permitted.)
2. With more than one first control, the side suits comes first. Unless there totally are two Aces (or more) on the replier's hand.
3. 4 NT always means exactly two Aces (with or without a void)
4. 5 NT always means at least three Aces (with or without a void)

Tactics

When a slam seems possible, and especially when this depends on partner's controls in a certain suit, then asking bids may well be the road to follow. If asking in a suit in which you have either the Ace or the King, you may get excess information.

== Applicability ==
Asking bids, although developed for the Culbertson bidding system, which today largely has become obsolete, can be used in combination with most natural bidding system, such as Acol, Five Card Major and others. Like Blackwood and Cue bids, Asking bids are Slam-seeking.

It is indeed possible to use Asking bids together with (most variants of) Blackwood, even in one and the same deal. But Asking bids can never be used in combination with Cue bids, as they can't be distinguished from each other.

The advantages of Asking bids increase especially if used together with Culbertson's 4 and 5 NT conventions. Here the rules are very clear:

"If a series of questions begin with 4 NT, then that specific bid is Blackwood. But if the first question has been a bid in a new suit (not earlier bid by the couple), then the 4 NT instead asks for the partner's trump top quality." The 4 NT bid is then asking for the number of top three trumps (Ace, King and Queen), then a later 5 NT bid, asks for additional trump length. Whilst a 5 NT bid not preceded by any 4 NT bid, equals the Grand slam force convention.

After a first Asking bid (with reply from partner), then the 4 NT bid asks for "trump top quality". (Replies from partner - 5♣ = not any of the Ace, King or Queen in the agreed trump. 5♦ = one of the three top trump cards, and 5♥ = two of them. The one who bids 4 NT must have at least one of top three trumps on his own hand). If 4 NT (at once or a round later) is followed by 5 NT, then that bid asks for "trump length". Here the replies are based on what's the minimum number of cards for a usual trump agreement length. Replies - 6 ♣ = no extra trump card; 6 ♦ = one more; 6 ♥ = two more.

When preceded by the "non-Blackwood" 4 NT trump top quality bid, any thereafter following 5 NT bid must be understood as "Any additional, not yet shown trump cards ?", which isn't equal to the 5 NT Grand slam force.

If using Asking bids, the player who first put an Asking bid forward, must thereafter be "the Captain" of the couple for the remaining part of the auction. The partner has to rather take on the role of a private soldier, and stick to giving correct answers to what very well may become a series of questions. This isn't limited to always be the opener (or the first overcaller), but is often the case. Cue bids are from that perspective different.

=== Full auction example ===
Here West has 13 HCP and East only 5 HCP, a total of just 18 (and thereby 22 HCP to North/South). If adding distribution points to both hands, West and East would according to most such calculations still be a little short of the required points for a game even (25-26 Distribution and HCP is normally needed for a 4 ♠ contract)! But not everything can be measured in numbers - and a Grand slam in ♠ really is the correct contract below - and must be considered to be safe regardless of the remaining distribution and the opponents' lead.

Both North and South are silent during the auction. Provided West begins to speak in the auction, only a wrench distribution in North's favor would disturb this bidding. A doubling of the opening bid could be disregarded from by East. It is however a constructed example, made in order to show the benefits of Asking bids in combination with Culbertson's 4-5 NT combination.

♠♤	A K Q 8 6 2	W E	♠♤	10 9 7 4 3
♥	6 4 2	W E	♥	
♦	A 8 7 4	W E	♦	K Q
♣♧		W E	♣♧	10 7 5 4 3 2

West	East
1 ♠	3 ♠
4 ♦	4 ♥
4 NT	5 ♣
5 ♦	5 ♥
5 NT	6 ♥
7 ♠	(pass)

After West's opening, East confirms ♠ as trump. As West has ♦A, the 4 ♦ Asking bid is looking for second control and any possible first control(s). East now can show his void in ♥, as he has the second control in ♦. Now West wishes to know whether East has any of the three top trump cards. This bid later enables the 5 NT-bid to be a trump length issue (compare with the significance of 5 NT as Grand slam force). East's reply 5 ♣ is no surprise to West, who now with 5 ♦(a repeated Asking bid) wonders if East also has the third control in ♦. The King-Queen is both a second and a third control (but not a first), and as East's void in ♥ is "covered" with five trumps, East can now declare also his third control in ♥. Now West wishes to be certain of a good trump support - 5 NT. East's 6 ♥ shows two more trump cards than his/her 3 ♠ reply to West's opening earlier has shown. It is now easy for West to determine the final bid, a 7 ♠ Grand slam contract.

The example is an illustration of the significance of distribution combined with the difficulty to find Grand slams, even when they are easy to see - on 26 cards. As well of how Asking bids combined with not just trump top, but trump length.

== History ==
Asking bids were invented by one of the original pioneers of contract bridge, Ely Culbertson, but were later removed from Culbertson's system in favour of cue bids and other slam seeking conventions. But they can co-exist with some other slam seeking conventions, such as most variants of Blackwood, in the sense that both can exist - but only one of them at a time. Culbertson's asking bids can be combined with other bidding systems, such as Acol and five-card majors, although originally designed for Culbertson's own system. The idea gained favour with the Italian Blue Team from the late fifties onwards, and was subsequently adopted in Precision Club and its variants, such as Power Precision.
