= Grand slam force =

The Grand Slam Force is a bidding convention in contract bridge that was developed by Ely Culbertson in 1936. It is intended to be used in cases where the combined hands of a partnership are so strong that a slam (winning at least 12 tricks) is a near-certainty and a grand slam (winning all 13 tricks) is a possibility. It enables a player to gain information about the quality of the top trumps held by his partner (i.e., which of the ace, king or queen).

When the Grand Slam Force was invented in the 1930s (when it was called "Josephine," named after Ely's then-wife Josephine Culbertson), Blackwood had not evolved into what has become the standard: Roman Keycard Blackwood (often called RKCB). Using KCB, there are 5 keycards -- the four aces and the king of trumps. The responses to 4NT are: 5C = 1 or 4 keycards; 5D = 0 or 3 keycards; 5H = 2 keycards without the Queen of trumps; 5S = 2 keycards with the Queen of trumps. As you can see, there is no need to bid 5NT to ask for the A, K, and Q of trumps. These days, the only time the Grand Slam Force is used is when partner opens the bidding or when the opener and responder have voids. In fact, 5NT is now used almost exclusively as "5NT Pick-A-Slam."

When this convention is in force, a bid of 5NT (five notrump), when it does not conflict with other conventions used by that partnership (e.g., a 5NT Blackwood bid), is forcing to slam in the suit last bid, unless the trump suit has already been agreed on earlier in the auction. The partner of the 5NT bidder bids as follows:

- 6 of the agreed trump suit if holding one of the top three trump honors (e.g., the ace)
- 7 of the agreed trump suit if holding two of the top three trump honors (e.g., the king and queen)

Actually, the previous sentence is the way the convention used to be used -- but these days, respond 7C with 2 of the top 3. Maybe partner has his own trump suit which is better than opener's, but responder has potential losers in opener's suit.

For example, if a partnership is using the Grand Slam Force and one member bids 1♥ and his partner bids 5NT, it is implied that hearts are the desired trump suit. The original bidder will sign off in 6♥ with one of the top three heart honors and 7♥ with two of the top three heart honors.

As with all bidding systems, the Grand Slam Force has its limitations, not the least of which is that the chances of employing it directly over an opening one-bid are extremely rare and 5NT must be understood to be the GSF in other situations. Numerous variations of the convention have been developed.

When partner has already shown a strong suit, such as by an opening and a jump rebid in his suit and may therefore be presumed to have two of the top three honors, "Josephine" asks for a third top trump honor. By the same token, if the 5NT bidder is the one who has already promised a strong suit, "Josephine" requests only one of the top three honors. It's all relative to what has been shown previously.

== See also ==
- Asking bid
- Blackwood convention
- Cue bid
- Culbertson 4-5 notrump
- Gerber convention
- Norman four notrump
- Quantitative notrump bids
- Slam-seeking conventions
