= Carrot 4NT =

The Carrot 4NT slam-convention was developed in Carrot Club, but can be used in any bidding system instead of the more common Blackwood or RKC conventions. It is a refinement of an older convention, Culbertson 4NT.

Rather than asking for Aces or keycards, 4NT is used to show number of keycards.

This convention applies when 4NT is preceded by cuebids, and generally when 4NT is a non-jumping bid. The immediate advantage of this approach over Blackwood/RKC, is that while still establishing the combined number of keycards, the pair will be able to use the 5-level for cuebids, too, to more thoroughly explore and negotiate their slam-potential.

Normally, 4NT shows at least 3 out of 5 keycards (including the King of trumps) plus first or second round control in any suit(s) not yet cuebid.

Thus, if a player by-passes 4NT or omits bidding 4NT when he logically could, it means that he either lacks the required number of keycards or that he lacks control in a side-suit that has not yet been cuebid.

If a player has already shown a 17+hcp hand (by reverse-bid, big-club opening, takeout-double followed by new suit, etc.), his partner's 4NT promises only 2 out of 5 keycards.

If a player has opened with a strong 2C or shown a 20+ balanced hand, and later bids 4NT, he promises 4 out of 5 keycards.

Under this convention, 4NT is still Blackwood or RKC when it is a jumping bid and not a natural raise. Also, if a player opens, raises, or jumps to 4H/4S without any preceding cuebids, 4NT by his partner is Blackwood or RKC. Likewise, in competitive situations where opponents have bid at the 3- or 4-level, 4NT is Blackwood or RKC.
