= Design for Bidding =

Book about bridge (card game)

- Dust jacket of the first edition
- Author: S. J. Simon
- Language: English
- Subject: Contract bridge
- Published: 1949
- Publisher: Nicholson & Watson
- Pages: 268
- OCLC: 13491181

Design for Bidding is a book by the Russian-born English bridge player S. J. "Skid" Simon, published posthumously in 1949. It is about the theory of bidding in contract bridge, particularly in the context of the Acol system of which Simon was one of the co-developers. It was the first, and as of 2015, remains one of the few, studies of the thought processes involved in designing a bidding system, rather than simply setting out the author's conclusions.

Design for Bidding is described as "the best thing he [Simon] has done on bridge", lofty praise considering the recognition given Simon's earlier book Why You Lose at Bridge, itself "widely perceived to be the best book ever written on Bridge."

Design For Bidding "remains wonderful reading, because Simon argues persuasively for the Acol state of mind style of bidding."

== Structure ==
The book is divided into three parts: I, The Inexactitude of Bidding; II, Enquiry into Bidding; and III, Design for Bidding.

Part I is a long general introduction, in seven chapters. In it, Simon sets out what he calls the "deciding factors" to be assessed before adopting a specialised meaning for a bid:

1. "The effects on other types of hands;"
2. "The comparative frequency of occurrence of the rivals;"
3. "Their obedience or otherwise to the Principle of Lesser Risk; (Note: "The Principle of the Lesser Risk indicates the selection of that bid which, on the probabilities known at the time of making it, seems to offer the best chance of beating Absolute Par." "The Absolute Par is the minimum number of points that must be lost by the weaker hands on a double-dummy analysis. It stands for the perfect result.") and, a bad last,"
4. "Their actual working on the hands on which they are used."

Part I concludes with Simon's description of Acol as "not so much a system as an attitude of mind".

In Part II, Simon discusses in turn various aspects of bidding: notably, the choice of forcing opening bid; the meaning of opening two-bids; the strength of an opening bid of 1NT; whether or not a double raise should be forcing; the forcing take-out; 4NT and 5NT and asking bids as slam tries; (Note: Simon advocated the Culbertson 4-5 notrump: describing it as "an adult weapon", and the Blackwood convention as "merely a nice toy"; an opinion well enough known to be quoted 24 years later.) whether or not a change of suit should be forcing; and informatory doubles and intervening bids.

In Part III, Simon attempts to merge his conclusions from Part II into a unified whole.
