= Benjamin Twos =

Benjamin Twos is a convention in which the 2♣ and 2♦ bids are used as artificial openings to represent strong hands. It covers all opening bids of two of a suit: 2♣, 2 ♦, 2 ♥ and 2 ♠, albeit with a focus on the minor suits. Of these opening bids, the 2 ♣ and 2 ♦ are strong artificial opening bids, without a necessary connection to the suit bid whilst 2 ♥ and 2 ♠ are weak, preemptive bids indicating a good six-card ♥ or ♠ suit without much strength in the other suits. Typically the hand is too weak for a normal 1 ♥ or 1 ♠ opening. But weak (or preemptive) opening bids at the second level are in common use in most natural bidding systems today, known as weak twos. As such, the emphasis is on the minors here, rather than the majors.

The key focus of Benjamin twos is the use of both the 2 ♣ and 2 ♦ openings as representing different strong hands. Unlike the usual strong two clubs convention, in Benjamin, the 2 ♣ opening bid is not the strongest. However, it is still strong, usually showing an unknown strong 6-card suit, generally with approximately 17-23 HCPs.

In Benjamin, the 2 ♦ opening is used for the true powerhouse hands, willing to force to game opposite nothing. In general, this is at least 25 HCPs when balanced, but sometimes fewer when unbalanced. But even when unbalanced, this is noticeably stronger than Benjamin 2 ♣.

In other words, opening bids of 2 of both minors are used to show two different levels of strength.

This convention is often played in an Acol bidding system, where the 2 ♣ opening represents the old Acol twos and a balanced 23-24.

== Game Forcing Two Diamonds ==
This opening bid is a distinctive feature of Benjamin Twos, closely resembling the strong two clubs convention. The opening bid of 2 ♦ is game-forcing. That is, opener and responder must keep the bidding open until at least a game has been reached. (3 NT / 4 ♥ / 4 ♠ / 5 ♦ / 5 ♣). Like the strong 2 ♣ in other systems, this bid is entirely artificial, saying nothing at all about the number of ♦. For balanced (and semi-balanced) hands a common requirement is to have at least 24 HCP, but the point count can be lower with a long solid suit.

== Benjamin Strong Two Clubs ==
The Benjamin 2 ♣ opening is similar to the regular strong two clubs convention, but somewhat weaker. It often represents a strong two bid in any suit, but also includes a balanced type too strong for opening 2NT, but not strong enough to force to game.

The 2 ♣ opening requires either a good 6 card (or longer) suit and about 17-23 HCP (or 1.5 tricks short of game) or a balanced hand with 22/23-24 HCP. With an even better hand, the opening 2 ♦ should be used instead.

== Opening Examples ==
Hand: ♠ A Q 10 6 ♥ K Q J 10 3 2 ♦ A J ♣ 5

This hand, with a strong 6 card ♥ and 17 HCP is qualified for a 2♣ opening, but not strong enough to demand the game already in the opening bid.

Hand: ♠ A K Q J ♥ K Q J 10 3 ♦ A K J ♣ 5

This even stronger hand, lacks a 6 card suit - but counts 24 HCP and can hence be opened on 2♦. The opener should now not be worried to not be given a chance to speak again, as long as the bidding has not reached at least the level of a game. In the rare cases, when the bidding has reached 3NT (a game), but one of the two players of a couple bids 4 ♣/♦ (which is a higher bid, but not a game), the bidding must still reach at least a game.

== History ==
The Benjamin convention was devised by Scotsman Albert Benjamin of Glasgow (1909-2006). The concept is also known as French Two Bids and also Unnamed Strong Two Bid Openings. As a feature of the Acol bidding system, the Benjamin Two Bids are employed to indicate an opening, which almost guarantees a game holding. These multiple designations arise from the fact that the concept has found a certain popularity in European countries and have been given national designations, which have then been translated. Benjamin Twos has become popular at some internet duplicate Bridge pages.
