= Bridge Base Basic =

Bidding system for the game of bridge

Bridge base basic, also known as BBO basic, is a bidding system for the game of bridge based on the Standard American Yellow Card (SAYC). It is simplified, suitable for beginners, and widely used in internet bridge, particularly on Bridge Base Online. It is taught in Fred Gitelman's educational software called Learn to Play Bridge that is available as a free download from the American Contract Bridge League's website.

== Key points of BBO Basic bidding ==
Like SAYC, BBO basic depends upon hand evaluation using the high card point (HCP) method. Hand shape adjustments are made for long suits (1 point additional for every card longer than 4 in a suit), when bidding a new suit, and for short suits when showing support for partners bid (5 for a void, 3 for a singleton, and 1 for a doubleton). Other similarities to SAYC include:

- Five-card majors: opening a major suit promises at least five cards in that suit.
- Weak two bids: two-diamond, -heart, or -spade opening bids are made with a six-card suit and 6 to 10 high-card points. The bid promises two of the top three honors in the suit.
- Strong two clubs: a 2♣ opening bid is artificial and promises 22 points or more.
- Pre-emptive openers: including weak-three bids (in all suits, except notrump) and weak-four bids (minor suits only) similar to the weak two-bids but showing additional length.
- Notrump openers show a balanced hand (no void, no singleton, at most one doubleton, and may include a five-card major) with the following point ranges:
  - 1 NT = 15 to 17 HCP
  - 2 NT = 20 to 21 HCP
  - 3 NT = 25 to 27 HCP
- Stayman and Jacoby transfer conventions for notrump openers
- Blackwood or Gerber for slam bidding.

== Opener approximate hand strengths ==
For unbalanced hands:

- 0 to 12 HCP: pass, unless the hand is suitable for a preemptive opening bid.
- 13 to 21 HCP: hands of 13 HCP or more are strong enough to open with natural bidding, including:
  - minimum opening hands with 13 to 15 HCP
  - medium opening hands with 16 to 18 HCP
  - maximum opening hands with 19 to 21 HCP
- For unbalanced hands with 22+ points: show a very strong opening hand by using the strong 2♣ convention.

For balanced hands, open with a no-trump bid when you can limit your hand to the following point ranges:

- 15 to 17 HCP: 1NT
- 20 to 21 HCP: 2NT
- 25 to 27 HCP: 3NT

For other balanced hands, opener can indicate points by opening in the longest suit and then bidding no-trump for the second bid:

- 13 to 14 HCP: bid 1 of a suit and then make a no-jump rebid in no trump (1NT)
- 18 to 19 HCP: bid 1 of a suit and then make a jump rebid in no trump (2NT)
- 22 to 24 HCP: bid 2♣ and then make a no-jump rebid in no trump (2NT)
- 28 to 30 HCP: bid 2♣ and then make a jump rebid in no trump (3NT)
- 31 to 32 HCP: bid 2♣ and then make a double-jump rebid in no trump (4NT)

== Responder approximate hand strengths ==
The responder also communicates hand strength through bidding by responding to partner's opening bid uniquely according to their high card points.

- 0 to 5 HCP: a hand in this range normally should not be bid (i.e. should pass) unless partner opens with the strong 2♣ convention.
- 6 to 9 HCP: this is a minimum response hand. Responder can show support for partner's bid with a simple raise to the 2-level, bid a new suit but only at the one-level, or respond 1NT.
- 10 to 11 HCP: any new suit bid at the 2-level promises opening partner at least 10 points. With 10 or 11 points, responder has a medium-strength hand and can bid another 4-card suit but at the two-level, now in hopes of discovering the 8-card fit, planning eventually to "invite" partner to a game contract.
- 12 or more HCP: you have a maximum hand and desire a game contract. Responder has the bidding space available to search for a fit and share additional information that may lead to a slam contract.

=== Responding with a minimum hand ===
1. First priority is to show 3-card support for partner's 5-card major; respond 2 of the major with 6–9 points. Bidding 4 of the major immediately is preemptive and shows 6–9 points with 5-card support and at least 1 singleton or void in a side suit.
2. Next priority is to bid the longest suit at the 1-level, promising 6–9 points and at least 4 cards in that suit. Do not go to the 2-level with fewer than 10 points.
3. Show support for partner's minor suit opening if you have 5-card support (4-card support is acceptable but not preferred) by responding with 2 of the minor. Bidding 4 or 5 of the minor is preemptive and shows 6–9 points with 6-card support and at least 1 singleton or void in a side suit.
4. When responder cannot support partner's bid, the response is 1 NT, to show a bad fit and no more than 9 points (i.e. denying ability to raise or bid a new suit). This gives partner the choice of passing and playing in 1 NT or changing to a partial game in another trump suit (partner knows that responder should pass with 6 to 9 points).

=== Responding with a medium hand ===
1. First priority is to show 3-card support for partner's 5-card major; so, rebid partners suit at the 3 level. This "limit raise" skips the 2-level, specifically to indicate 10 or 11 points; shows an 8-card fit in partner's major trump suit; and invites partner to make a game bid with more than minimum opening strength. (The opening bid promised a minimum of 13, and responder's 10 or 11 points adds up to 23 or 24 points, very close to the 25 points needed to bid a major-suit or no-trump game.)
2. Next priority is to bid the longest suit.
3. Show 5-card support for partner's minor suit opening (4-card support is acceptable but not preferred) by responding 3 of the minor.

=== Responding with a maximum hand ===
Your partnership should be in a game-level contract when responder adds a minimum of 12 points to partner's promise of at least 13. Unlike Standard American Yellow Card, where a strong jump shift is recommended, responder shows a very strong hand in BBO Basic by using the "principle of slow arrival". This means keeping the bidding low and showing support for partners suit with two sequential bids:

1. Bid another suit first at the lowest level, show a long or a strong suit.
2. With the second bid, show support for partner's suit. Even if partner supports responder's first bid, responder should bid partner's suit to indicate the 8-card fit and game-level points.

=== Responding with balanced hands ===
A no-trump response to partner's opening bid indicates point information and lack of suit length:

- response of 1NT shows 6 to 9 HCP, no support for partner's suit, and no 4-card bid;
- response of 2NT shows 13 to 15 HCP, no support for partner's suit, and no 4-card bid;
- response of 3NT shows 16 to 18 HCP, no support for partner's suit, and no 4-card bid.

== Opener's response to partner's search for a fit ==
Often, in response to a natural opening bid in the 13–21 point range, the responder will suggest a new suit at the one level. While this promises 6 points or more, information is needed to make the optimum contract.

If opener has 4-card support for responder's new suit, then opener should show support but also has the burden of showing his hand strength so that responder can choose the best contract:

- minimum opener (13 to 15 points): bid at the 2 level.
- medium opener (16 to 18 points): bid at the 3 level, inviting game.
- maximum opener (19 to 21 points): bid at the 4 level.

Examples (showing only partnership bids, with no bidding by opponents):

- 1♣ – 1♥ – ; 2♥ – Pass – : both partners have minimum hands but find a major (hearts) fit.
- 1♣ – 1♥ – ; 3♥ – Pass – : opener has hearts and extra points, and invites game; but responder has only a minimum hand.
- 1♣ – 1♥ – ; 4♥ – Pass – : opener has game values.
- 1♣ – 1♥ – ; 2♥ – 4♥ – : opener has minimum hand, but responder has game-going points.
- 1♣ – 1♥ – ; 3♥ – 4♥ – : opener has extra points and invites game, and responder has extra points and accepts.
