= Cue bid =

Bid of the opponents' suit in contract bridge

In contract bridge, a cue bid (also, cuebid or cue-bid) is either a bid of the opponents' suit, or "slam seeking": a slam-investigating bid made during an auction's later rounds that shows control of a suit.

Traditionally a cue bid is "slam seeking", but in the early 21st century the usage appears to be giving way to control bid.

== Bid of the opponents' suit ==
After the opponents have bid a suit, a cue bid of that suit is normally intended as a forcing bid. It shows interest in contesting the contract and asks partner to describe their hand.

=== Immediate cue bid ===
An immediate cue bid is made directly over opponent's opening bid. Traditionally, it denotes a hand unsuited for a takeout double. For example, after RHO opens 1♠, a hand such as ♠ — ♥ AKQ10985 ♦ AQ6 ♣ K85 would prefer not to double for takeout, because partner might make a penalty pass. A cue bid of 2♠, as traditionally used, would be appropriate: it tends to show great high card strength, probably with a hand pattern unsuited to defense. Partner is expected to respond in their longest suit, and the subsequent bidding proceeds naturally.

However, those very strong hands are rare enough that the traditional meaning has been largely abandoned, and other meanings assigned to the immediate cue bid. The most common treatment is now the Michaels cuebid, which shows a weakish or moderate hand with at least 5-5 in two unbid suits.

=== The jump cue bid ===
The immediate jump cue bid of opener's suit has a specific meaning. It is typically a long totally solid minor with stoppers in the other two suits. Partner is asked to bid 3NT with a stop in the suit opened or else to bid four or five clubs (pass or correct).

=== Cue bidding in the later rounds ===
Generally, after the opponents have bid a suit, a cue bid of that suit shows strength, and forces the bidding to continue for at least one round. The following are common situations:

- After partner's takeout double or overcall, the cue bid shows a hand with at least the strength of an opening bid:

West	North	East	South
1♥	Dbl	Pass	2♥

West	North	East	South
1♥	1♠	Pass	2♥

- If the pair does not play strong immediate cuebids, the takeout double followed by a cue bid shows a very strong hand:

West	North	East	South
1♥	Dbl	Pass	1♠
Pass	2♥		

- Immediately after RHO's overcall, it shows a strong hand, probably fitting partner's suit, and is usually regarded as game-forcing:

West	North	East	South
	1♥	1♠	2♠

- After RHO's overcall, in a later round but below 3NT, it often shows a stopper in the opponents' suit, so that partner can bid notrump and thus place the contract advantageously (see Antipositional). This situation calls for prior partnership discussion. For example, the cue bid in this context can be used to ask for a stopper, rather than to show one. In the US, the asking approach is known as a "Western cue bid", and in the UK, as a "Directional asking bid" (DAB). Sometimes, the delayed cue bid can be used as an advance cue bid (see below).

West	North	East	South
	1♦	1♠	Dbl^{1}
Pass	2♣	Pass	2♠

^{1.}Negative double

== Slam seeking ==
Once a trump suit has been agreed upon and the bidding cannot die below the game level (e.g. 1♥–3♥, or ... 2♥–3♥, or 1♥–1♠; 3♠), any subsequent bid of a suit other than the trump suit is a cue bid showing first round control of that suit, i.e. the ace or a void.

Passing a suit that could be bid tends to deny holding first-round control in that suit. Bids of suits already bid show second-round control. Returning to the trump suit shows a lack of interest in slam or not having anything else to bid. For example:

South	North
1♦	1♥
3♥	4♣
4♦	4♥
4♠	4NT

South has shown 16-18 total points, while North's hand is largely unknown. North's bid of 4♣ is a cue-bid showing first-round control of clubs and an interest in slam. After South's bid of 4♦ North bids 4♥, an apparent signoff. It may well be that North wants to bid a slam, but has two fast losers in the spade suit. After South bids 4♠ showing control of the spade suit, North employs the Blackwood convention to proceed further.

The main disadvantage of both Blackwood and Gerber is that they give little information about voids, which can be as powerful as aces under certain circumstances. Cue bidding is designed to pass information on "first round control" i.e. an ace or a void.

In the "Italian" system of slam cue-bidding, the cheapest suit is always bid first. Thus, in the example above North's bid of 4♣ would deny control of spades, and therefore South would only proceed if they had control of spades, which in this case their continuation of 4♦ instead of a signoff of 4♥ would promise. Often, Italian cue bids only promise 2nd round control (a king or a singleton).

=== Basic cue bidding ===
Basic cue bidding occurs after the trump suit has been agreed on explicitly (example above) or as it is agreed implicitly. The first bid of a side suit by either partner shows a control, and most players extend that to subsequent bids of a side suit so that both may show control in the same suit. The most common approach is that first-round controls are bid first, and second-round controls are bid in later rounds of bidding. Some players, though, bid both first and second-round controls in the first round, and confirm first-round controls only later. Some bid high-card controls first or distinguish short-suit controls by jump bids. Even basic cue bidding therefore requires some partnership agreements.

The Official Encyclopedia of Bridge gives an example where the first cue bid implies the trump-suit agreement.

♠	A J 8	W E	♠	K Q 10 6 3
♥	K 10 7 6	W E	♥	A 3
♦	A Q 10 7	W E	♦	8 3 2
♣	K 9	W E	♣	A 8 6

West	East
1NT	3♠
4♦	4♥
4♠	5♣
6♠	Pass

"West's 4♦ does not suggest an alternative trump suit; spades are agreed by implication, since without spade support, West would return to 3NT. "

=== Advance cue bidding ===
An advance cue bid – not to be confused with "advanced" – is made before the trump suit has been agreed upon even implicitly. Partner does not yet know that the trump fit has been found or whether the suit bid is real or shows a control.

♠	K Q 8	W E	♠	6 2
♥	A J 9 6 4 2	W E	♥	K Q 3
♦	K 3	W E	♦	A Q J 7 5 2
♣	10 3	W E	♣	A 8

West	East
1♥	2♦
2♥	3♣
3NT	4♥
Pass	

In the example, 3♣ is an advance cue bid, we may infer East intends, by reference to the club control without biddable club suit and to the excellent heart support. The subsequent preference for hearts by strong correction of 3NT should reveal the advance cue to partner; holding the minor suits without hearts East would pass or raise notrump. The auction should now proceed to the comfortable 6♥.

However, the advance cue bid is a subtle tool, prone to be misunderstood if the partnership is not sufficiently well coordinated and on the same wavelength. The following disaster struck world champion Paul Chemla and Catherine D'Ovidio in the 7th European Mixed Championships (2002):

♠	K J 10 9 8	W E	♠	7 4 3
♥	A Q 3	W E	♥	K J 9 8
♦	A 9	W E	♦	K 3
♣	A K 3	W E	♣	Q J 7 5

West	East
2♣^{1}	2♦^{2}
2♠	2NT^{3}
3NT	4♦
Pass	

^{1.}Strong and artificial.
^{2.} Waiting.
^{3.} Ambiguous but forcing.

D'Ovidio wanted to "refine" the bidding with an advance cue bid of 4♦ before supporting spades, but Chemla got the wrong idea and passed, imagining partner with a weak distributive hand with long diamonds. 4♦ went down three, while 6♠ and 6NT were on, as the spade finesse was working.

== See also ==
- Blackwood convention
- Norman four notrump
- Quantitative no trump bids
- Grand slam force
- Slam-seeking conventions
- Asking bid
