= 4NT =

4NT may refer to:

- 4NT (bridge), a bid in the game of bridge, especially contract bridge
- 4NT (shell), a command-line interpreter for Microsoft Windows
- 4NT internal variable
