= Rubens advances =

Bridge bidding method

Rubens advances (also referred to as transfer advances) constitute a bridge bidding method that can be used by a bridge partnership to respond to overcalls. The method was devised by Jeff Rubens and published in The Bridge World.

Using Rubens advances, the available bids in the suits starting with the cue bid in opponent's suit up to and including the bid below a two-level support bid of the overcall are all transfer bids to the next suit. Furthermore, the available bids in the suits below the cue bid are all natural and forcing for one round. The no-trump bids at various levels are not affected by this method of advancing partner's overcalls and retain their normal meaning.

The claimed advantage over other treatments is that - thanks to the transfer nature of the various bids - hands with a wider range of strengths can be introduced following partner's overcall.

== Examples ==
When playing Rubens advances, the following applies after an opposing 1♣ opening and a 1♠ overcall:

(1♣) - 1♠ - (pass) - ??

2♣ : transfer to diamonds
2♦ : transfer to hearts
2♥ : transfer to spades (a support bid too strong for a natural raise)
2♠ : natural support bid

When partner's overcall does not skip any suits, the Rubens advances reduce to the standard treatment in which new suits are forcing and the cue bid promises support. For instance:

(1♥) - 1♠ - (pass) - ??

2♣ : natural, round forcing
2♦ : natural, round forcing
2♥ : transfer to spades (a support bid too strong for a natural raise)
2♠ : natural support bid

== Extensions ==
The methodology is often extended to cases in which the opener gets raised. It is then common to utilise the double as lowest 'transfer bid':

(1♣) - 1♠ - (2♣) - ??

dbl : transfer to diamonds
2♦ : transfer to hearts
2♥ : transfer to spades (a support bid too strong for a natural raise)
2♠ : natural support bid
