= Byzantine Blackwood convention =

Bidding convention in the game of bridge

Byzantine Blackwood is a bidding convention in the game of bridge. Devised by Jack Marx, it is a complex version of the Blackwood convention (by which a four notrump (4NT) call asks about partner's honor card holdings). Its premise is that both aces and kings may safely be shown in response to a Blackwood-type 4NT enquiry; provided that such kings are in well-defined key or half-key suits, there being no more than two such suits. The name was chosen to express the idea that Byzantine Blackwood is a development from Roman Blackwood, by analogy with the Byzantine Empire and the Roman Empire; rather than that the convention is of Byzantine complexity. It seems to be little used nowadays (2014), most experts employing some form of Roman Key Card Blackwood.

== Key suits ==
Key suits are defined as:

- the trump suit, if one has been agreed upon either specifically or by inference,
- a genuine side suit that has been bid and supported,
- any suit bid by a player whose partner's first bid was in notrump.

== Half key suits ==
A half-key suit is defined as a genuine suit that has been bid but not supported. When each partner has bid a half-key suit, the suit bid by the four notrump bidder is the half-key suit in which a king may be shown. Or use Blackwood or RKCB in this situation.

== Response schemes ==
Byzantine is initiated by a call of 4NT and there are two scales of responses: one for use when there is only one key suit, and one when there are two. If there is only one key suit, the king of a half-key suit may be shown; if there are two key suits, half-key suits are not shown. The responses to 4NT are:

| Bid | With one key suit | With two key suits |
|---|---|---|
| 5♣ | 0A; 3A; or 2A+kK | 0A; 3A; or 2A+kK |
| 5♦ | 1A; 4A; or 3A+kK | 1A; 4A; or 3A+kK |
| 5♥ | 2A; A+kK+kQ; or kA+kK+hK | 2A; k(A+K+Q); or A+2kK |
| 5♠ | 2A+kK+kQ; or 3A+hK | 2A+k(K+Q); 2A+2kK; or A+kK+k(K+Q) |
| 5NT | 3A+kK+kQ; or 4A+kK | 3A+k(K+Q); 3A+2kK; 4A+kK; 2A+kK+k(K+Q); or A+2k(K+Q) |

A=ace, kA=key suit Ace, kK=key suit king, kQ=key suit queen, k(A+K+Q)=ace, king and queen of the same key suit, hK=half-key suit king

Thus, when there is only one key suit, a Byzantine 5♣ response shows either: no aces, three aces, or two aces plus the key-suit king. The response when there are two key suits is the same; but when the answer is, say, 5♥, the meaning depends upon the preceding bidding sequence:

| Opener | Responder |
|---|---|
| 1NT | 2♦* |
| 2♥ | 4NT |
| 5♥ | |

If 2♦ is a Game Forcing Stayman or a 2♥ transfer, then 4NT agrees to hearts as trump and 5♥ shows two aces, or one ace and ♥KQ. As there is no half-key suit the third option is invalid.

| Opener | Responder |
|---|---|
| 1♥ | 1♠ |
| 3♠ | 4NT |
| 5♥ | |

Here there is a key suit and one half-key suit. The 5♥ response shows any two aces; ♥AKQ; or any ace plus ♠K and ♥K.

== Applications ==
Responses are given in the style of Roman Key Card Blackwood and may be based on a key-suit king instead of one of the aces normally shown. Key suits include:

- the trump suit,
- any genuine side suit bid and supported, or
- any suit bid by a player whose partner's first bid was in notrump.

== Not applied ==
Byzantine Blackwood is not used when there are more than two key suits.

| Opener | Responder |
|---|---|
| 1♠ | 2♦ |
| 2♥ | 4NT |
| 5♥ | |

Here there is a key suit (hearts, agreed by implication) and two half-key suits (spades and diamonds). So, according to partnership agreements, it is plain Blackwood showing two aces or RKCB showing two keycards without the queen of trumps.

Byzantine Blackwood is not used in the first round of bidding, i.e., 1♥ - 4NT, as responder may only be interested in aces. Partnership agreement is required on whether the 4NT call is Blackwood or RKCB. Many expert pairs employ a direct bid of 4NT as regular Blackwood, as recommended by Marty Bergen.

== Cue bidding ==
Cuebidding may follow the response of four notrump. In addition, after a response to four notrump has been made, a bid of five notrump asks for additional high card features. A king or doubleton king-queen not already shown in response to four notrump counts as one feature; a guarded king-queen combination not already shown count as two features. The responses are:

- 6♣ shows 0 or 3 features
- 6♦ shows 1 or 4 features
- 6♥ shows 2 features

== See also ==
- Contract bridge
- Bidding system
- Bridge convention
- Glossary of contract bridge terms
