= The Bridge World =

US magazine

- Editor: Jeff Rubens
- Categories: Games
- Frequency: Monthly
- Publisher: Jeff Rubens
- Founder: Ely Culbertson
- Founded: 1929
- Company: Bridge World Magazine, Inc.
- Country: United States
- Language: English
- Website: www.bridgeworld.com
- ISSN: 0006-9876

The Bridge World (TBW), the oldest continuously published magazine about contract bridge, was founded in 1929 by Ely Culbertson. It has since been regarded as the game's principal journal, publicizing technical advances in bidding and the play of the cards, discussions of ethical issues, bridge politics and leading personalities, and reports of major tournaments.

Culbertson edited TBW (assisted by a staff of well known writers and players such as Josephine Culbertson, Alfred Sheinwold, Samuel Fry Jr., Richard L. Frey, Albert H. Morehead, and Alphonse "Sonny" Moyse Jr.) until 1943. Morehead then became editor and continued until 1946, when Moyse took over. The McCall Corporation purchased TBW in 1963, and subsequently sold it to Edgar Kaplan. Kaplan became editor and publisher in late 1966; his first issue is dated January 1967. Jeff Rubens acted as Kaplan's co-editor until Kaplan's death in 1997, when Rubens became editor and publisher.

Largely because of its emphasis on IMP and matchpoint play, TBW is of interest primarily to tournament players.

== Regular features ==
Several features appear in each issue. The most popular are:

=== Editorial ===
Prior to 1967, editorials had appeared infrequently in TBW. Under the Kaplan/Rubens editorship, the Editorial became a monthly feature, and occupies a privileged position, appearing directly after the table of contents.

The Editorial usually discusses issues that are both timely and of import to tournament bridge players, and from time to time provides a forum for points of view that are not shared by the editorial staff. A non-random sample of the topics that have appeared in the Editorial over the past 40 years:

- Conditions of contest that reward the deliberate loss of preliminary matches
- Effective disclosure of partnership agreements, particularly in international competition where Highly Unusual Methods (HUMs) are prevalent. Similarly, the ongoing tension between players who wish to use their own bidding innovations and administrators who need to protect tournaments from HUMs.
- Slow play
- Dealing effectively with cheating and professionalism, primarily as to American Contract Bridge League (ACBL) tournaments
- Sex discrimination, evidenced by the existence of men-only, women-only, and open events
- Psychic bidding
- The Italian Bridge Federation's handling of the Burgay-Bianchi affair

=== Master Solvers Club (MSC) ===
The MSC is a combination of quiz and commentary. Several problem hands, along with the bidding so far on each, are presented and the reader is asked what call he would make (the number of problems per month has varied, but since at least the 1950s it has settled in at eight per issue). The answers to each question are given in the next issue, along with comments by expert panelists and by the panel's moderator.

This arrangement provides a means for the reader to improve his bidding skills, and to get a glimpse of the thought processes of the experts. Readers (or, in the context of the MSC, "solvers") are invited to submit their monthly scores to TBW. An annual competition is held for the highest 12-month total; the winner is invited to participate on the expert panel for a year.

For many years, the MSC was conducted by the same person each month: Samuel Fry Jr. from 1932 through 1945 and Albert H. Morehead from 1945 until his death in 1966. In January 1967, when Kaplan and Rubens took over TBW's editorship, a rotating group of directors was established: Moyse, Alfred Sheinwold, Howard Schenken, and Alan Truscott each directed the Club once every four months. Retirements, editorial disagreements, and health problems led to changes in the Club's directorship, and well known players such as Bobby Wolff, Jeff Rubens, Eric Kokish, Kit Woolsey, David Berkowitz, Larry Cohen, Bart Bramley, Danny Kleinman, Steve Landen, Karen McCallum, and Barry Rigal have all served as directors. In 2005, the MSC changed from a rotation of four directors to a rotation of six.

The form of the MSC has also changed markedly over the years. It was originally conceived as a means by which readers could test themselves on the Culbertson System, and for years it was held that there was only one correct answer to each problem – there being only one correct answer in the context of the Culbertson System. In the 1940s, a system of partial credits was instituted, with the "correct" answer receiving 100 points and lesser awards going to other answers.

A related change occurred in 1951, when the answers provided by experts other than the director were printed, along with their comments. According to TBW's history of the MSC, this was the magazine's first explicit acknowledgment that such a panel existed. The inclusion of expert comments has continued ever since.

Although most of the monthly problems concern bidding, under the Kaplan/Rubens editorship there has been one problem each month concerning leads, nearly always opening leads.

As to the problems that concern bidding, the experts' answers and comments lost clarity as the Culbertson/Goren consensus (four-card majors, strong notrump, strong two-bids, two-over-one promising only about 10 HCP) began to fall apart during the 1950s and 1960s. The experts' answers became influenced less by judgment and more by system, some experts even abstaining on occasion because they could not use a favored treatment. When different experts preferred different systems it became difficult to reach consensus and the comments became less valuable.

Therefore, in 1967 Kaplan and Rubens instituted a poll of experts to determine their bidding preferences (e.g., four-card or five-card majors, strong or weak two-bids, doubles of overcalls negative or for penalty, limit or forcing jump raises, etc.). Solvers were also invited to participate in the poll, but their role was restricted to breaking ties among the experts. The result was Bridge World Standard 1968, now known as BWS 68. There have been four major revisions of the system, in 1984, 1994, 2001, and 2017. BWS has always been intended as a platform for answering MSC problems, but also as a system that two experienced players could use if they had never partnered one another. Another use for BWS, perhaps intended in 1967 but never touted as a rationale, is to provide a means of tracking how expert preferences have changed over the years.

TBW regards the MSC as its most successful feature; certainly it is its longest running. It has been imitated in one guise or another by most bridge periodicals.

Several sample MSC problems, answers, and commentary can be found at TBW's web site.

=== Challenge the Champs ===
Challenge the Champs (CTC) is, in the words of TBW, "… a continuing bidding battle. Each month, two leading pairs compete, bidding deals from actual play (taken from old tournament reports or submitted by readers)." CTC is a feature that debuted in The Bridge Journal, a periodical edited by Jeff Rubens which was discontinued when Rubens joined the staff of TBW. At that point TBW took over the operation and the publication of CTC.

The format is to give each pair ten hands to bid, just as though they were at the table. Awards for different contracts are pre-set, and the results are scored as though they were matchpoints awarded on a 12 top. Over ten hands (again quoting from TBW): "… in the fifties is over average, in the sixties might win, higher is phenomenal."

In its original form, a pair would continue in CTC so long as it kept winning. The prior month's winners were termed the "Champs" and would compete against a new pair, the "Challengers." More recently the contest has been altered: TBW invites a pair to participate for exactly two consecutive months (first as Newcomers, then as Incumbents); if a pair wins at least one of its two matches, it is invited to return at a later time, and possibly take part in a CTC elimination tournament.

During the period that a pair could compete indefinitely, Matt Granovetter and Ron Rubin established the record for consecutive wins at 10, from July 1975 through April 1976, using the Ultimate Club, a strong club system with many relay sequences. In May 1976, Granovetter–Rubin lost to Kerri and Mike Shuman by the record combined score of 86–85.

CTC has been involved with some odd coincidences. As reported by John Kelly Karasek in a 1978 issue, the March 1975 issue both reported on the Facchini–Zucchelli foot-tapping incident in that year's Bermuda Bowl, and featured Facchini–Zucchelli as the Challengers in CTC. The May 1977 issue reported at length on a cheating scandal in the US international team trials in Houston Texas, during which the accused, Richard Katz and Larry Cohen (not the same Larry Cohen who has written extensively on the Law of Total Tricks), resigned from the ACBL. Katz and Cohen were the CTC Challengers during that same month.

=== Bits and Pieces ===
Bits and Pieces is principally a letters-to-the-editor column. It first appeared in January 1955. The very first letter printed in the column asked the correct play in a contract of 4♥, and the answer was to take an Ann Gallagher finesse.

The letters tend not to concern questions of bidding or play – these are dealt with in other features such as Pro et Contra (discontinued after Oswald Jacoby's death in 1984). They do tend to focus on issues raised in editorials, editorial style (e.g., matters such as gender-neutral prose, and the use of hyphens), unusual occurrences, laws and proprieties, and how sponsoring organizations such as the ACBL and the EBL regulate the game. The column also contains corrections and amplifications, book and product reviews, and occasional solicitations of readers' opinions.

=== Other features appearing regularly ===
- Test Your Play: Two problems consisting of declarer's hand and dummy. The bidding is often provided, but is usually immaterial. The level of play is quite high, and for many years the problems were set by Paul Lukacs, thought by many the game's premier composer of single dummy problems. A discussion of the correct play, or line of play, is provided elsewhere in the same issue.
- Kantar for the Defense: Written by Edwin B. Kantar. One problem consisting of a defender's hand and dummy. The bidding is usually provided and is often important to finding the correct solution. The general difficulty level is just a little lower than in Test Your Play.
- Tournament reports: These were nearly always written by Edgar Kaplan from the time that he purchased TBW until the mid-1990s. They cover the major ACBL events and world championships, although reports of events held by other sponsoring organizations occasionally appear. The approach is to discuss hands that were of particular interest, or that caused major swings in a match. Since 1997, authorship of the reports has been distributed among various reporters, part of the emphasis that Rubens has placed on broadening the magazine's perspective.
- Swiss Match: Usually authored by Jeff Rubens, this feature appears three times annually. It poses seven problems in bidding or play, in the form of a Swiss match. The reader is given a raw score for each of various actions that he might take. A post mortem section describes the outcome of each problem at the "other table," and the reader can IMP the results for himself. The format extends (by means of sub-problems) that used by Hugh Kelsey in his books Test Your Match Play and The Tough Game.
- Fifty Years Ago: This monthly feature first appeared in 1986. It revisits an issue that was published exactly fifty years earlier, and discusses points of interest from that issue, such as spectacular hands and bidding innovations. The column is of particular interest because the author discusses erstwhile hot topics in light of subsequent bridge history.
- Bridgeworks: Articles on bidding and play that are aimed at newer players.
- Classic Rewind: Outstanding articles from TBW's early years, thus from issues that are now difficult to obtain.

== Features that appear irregularly ==
Some features that do not appear according to a fixed schedule, or that have run their course:

- Appeals Committee: A series of articles that discusses how a committee should apply the Laws and Proprieties to adjudicate rulings that have been appealed by the players.
- That's Ridiculous: Collections of newspaper columns, submitted by the TBW readership, that mis-analyze hands. (The column title was adapted from a television program, That's Incredible!, then-popular in the US.)
- Technical innovations first appearing in TBW: a highly abbreviated list includes the Grand Slam Force, Stayman, lebensohl, PLOB, suit-preference signals, the unusual notrump, Puppet Stayman, and CRASH. (Blackwood is not included in this list: although Easley Blackwood Sr. submitted an article on his convention to TBW, it was rejected – presumably because it conflicted with the editor's eponymous Culbertson 4-5 Notrump convention.) A technical innovation in the play of the cards is now rare: many advanced coups were known to whist players during the 19th century. However, Geza Ottlik's The Quest and The Way It Is advanced readers' awareness of card play, particularly in the areas of elopement and squeeze play, well beyond levels previously discussed in the bridge literature.
- Several times each year, humorous, bridge-themed fiction appears in TBW. Authors such as Frank Vine, Robert Gray, Victor Mollo, David Bird, Danny Kleinman and Nick Straguzzi, and E. S. Baer (a pseudonym of Edgar Kaplan's), among many others, have contributed satirical short stories with points concerning bidding, the play of the cards, and bridge personalities.

== Bridge Hall of Fame ==
The concept for a Bridge Hall of Fame was originated with Lee Hazen, an early Life Master, and undertaken by The Bridge World magazine by a ballet poll of 115 leading bridge columnists in the United States; the top three names receiving at least thirty percent of the cast votes were elected in the inaugural year. The magazine continued with elections in 1965 and 1966 but then discontinued sponsorship. The elected members to the Bridge World's Hall of Fame were:

- 1964: Ely Culbertson, Charles Goren and Harold Vanderbilt
- 1965: Oswald Jacoby, Sidney Lenz and Milton Work
- 1966 Howard Schenken, Sidney Silodor and Waldemar von Zedtwitz

Subsequently, in 1995, the American Contract Bridge League inaugurated their own Hall of Fame and adopted the initial nine inducted in the Bridge World Hall of Fame.

== Bridge World Standard ==
Since 1968, the magazine has periodically polled experts on various bidding treatments and conventions in order to develop a unified system of bidding known as Bridge World Standard. There have been five versions of the system with the latest revision being the 2017 edition.

Bridge World Standard has evolved with the practices of North American experts and, similar to the Standard American Yellow Card system promulgated by the American Contract Bridge League, is offered as a system "for use by impromptu or casual partnerships, and as a basis for discussion by those who wish to formulate their own system."

== See also ==
- List of bridge books
- List of bridge magazines
