= Kantar cue bid =

Bridge convention

Kantar cue bids are a bridge convention. After the bidding is opened at the one level, and there is a suit overcall in the direct seat, a cue bid of the opponent's suit denotes a 3 suited hand with 8+ points, a singleton or void in the opponent's suit, and 4+ cards in every other suit. It was invented by American player Eddie Kantar.

This replaces the traditional use for such a bid, which is to show a limit raise or better in opener's suit.

== Examples ==
In the sequence 1♥ – (1♠) – 2♠, the cue bid of 2♠ denotes a 5-4-4-0 or 4-4-4-1 hand with a singleton or void in spades, as well as 8+ high card points.

At higher level auctions, such as 1♠ – (2♥) – 3♥, partnerships may by agreement allow slightly off-shape hands, including 5-4-3-1 shapes with only 3 card support for opener's suit.

Also of note, in sequences such as 1♦ – (1♥) – 2♥, the cue bid of 2♥ shows all 3-suited hands with 8+ points, so a negative double of 1♥ by implication must not include this hand type.
