= Carrot 1NT =

Contract bridge convention

The Carrot 1NT is a contract bridge convention, in which a 1NT opening bid shows a balanced hand 13–17 HCP. With 13–14 HCP, the opener may not have a 4-card major. With 15–17 HCP, all balanced hands (including those with a 5-card major) may be opened 1NT.

While originally developed for the Carrot Club system, this opening bid can be adopted by systems using 15–17 or 14–16 HCP ranges for their 1NT openings.

It combines the preemptive advantage of a weak 1NT opening when opener lacks sufficient holdings in the majors, with the constructive effect of a strong 1NT opening.

To manage the wide 5-point HCP range, the response structure has been designed to distinguish between weak invitational bids (7–9 hcp, inviting the 15–17 hand only) and strong invitational bids (10–11 hcp, inviting the 13–14 hand and game-forcing to 15–17).

== Responses to 1NT ==
- 2♥/2♠ are natural weak (7–9) invitations with a 5-card major.
- 2NT is a strong (10–11) invitation, which may also contain 4-card major(s) (opener will only pass with 13–14, in which case he cannot have a 4-card major).
- 2♣ is Stayman on most other hands (7–9 weak invitational, or game-forcing strength) but is also used with a 5-card major and strong invitation, 10–11.
- 2♦ is a relay to 2♥ with sign-off hands or certain game-forcing hands.
- 3♣/♦ are natural invitation to 3NT with a long suit, 6–9. If minimum, the suit should have 2 top honors.
- 3♥/♠ are natural invitation with 6-card suit, 9–11.
- 3NT natural to play.
- 4♣/♦ are transfers to 4♥ and 4♠ ("South African Texas").
- 4♥/♠ natural to play.
- 4NT is Blackwood 4 Aces.

== Continuations after 1NT – 2♦ – 2♥ ==
- Pass/2♠ = Sign-off in major.
- 2NT = New relay to 3♣ after which:
  - Pass/3♦ = Sign-off in minor.
  - 3♥/♠ = Game-force showing 3-card suit, singleton in other major, and 5–4 or 4–5 in the minors.
  - 3NT = 5–5 in the minors. Non-forcing with game-values.
- 3 of a suit = Natural slamtry with 6+ suit.
- 3NT = Forcing slamtry with 5–5 or better in the minors.

== Continuation after 1NT – 2NT ==
Opener will only pass with 13–14 hcp, thus denying a 4-card major.

With 15–17, opener can bid a 5-card major naturally, 3NT to play with no major, or use 3♣ to ask for a 4-card major. Over 3♣, responder bids 3♦ with 4♥, 3♥ with 4♠ or 3NT without major.

== After opponents overcall 1NT ==
- Double is negative, about 8–11 HCP, and forcing to 2NT (or penalty double).
- 2 of a suit is constructive to play or possibly mildly invitational.
- 2NT is Lebensohl-style and relay to 3♣. Responder can pass or correct to a suit lower than the overcall (or the suit overcalled, if overcall was artificial)
