= Albert Benjamin =

Scottish international bridge player

Albert L. Benjamin (1 April 1909 – 17 January 2006) was a Scottish international bridge player who invented a popular variant on the Acol bidding system. He lived in Glasgow all his life, though his father came from Sweden and his mother from Siberia. He was a leading player in his day, wrote a daily bridge column from 1937 to 1976, ran a bridge club, and was an excellent teacher of bridge.

== Life ==
Benjamin was born in Glasgow and discovered bridge at Glasgow University, studying medicine. In 1939 he married Judy, who duly became his favourite bridge partner. During World War II Benjamin was drafted into the Ambulance (Home Defence) Service, and quickly showed what he was made of: he paid another ambulance man to take over his night shift, and made a small fortune by playing poker, winning 47 months out of 48. Nevertheless, he regarded poker as a boring and soul-destroying game.

== Career in bridge ==
Benjamin picked up bridge again after the war. He opened the Kenmure Bridge Club (universally known as "Benjamin's") in a suburb of Glasgow. He wrote his daily column in the Glasgow Evening Citizen and wrote on other card games for the Scottish Weekly News. He opened a business buying and selling second-hand electrical measuring instruments after overhearing a man mention the need during a train journey. The business continued for the rest of his active life.

Benjamin represented Scotland 28 times, and eventually had the joy of beating England in 1964 (the first time in a Camrose Trophy match). However, his greatest contribution to the game was his invention of the most popular variant of the Acol system of bidding.

The system of opening two-bids that he devised used the opening 2♥ and 2♠ bids as weak pre-emptive bids, with 2♦ being used for 23+ points and 2♣ being used to show strong hands with eight playing tricks. The system is commonly known as Benji Acol (Benjaminised Acol). There is also Reverse Benji, in which the meanings of the opening bids of 2♣ and 2♦ are transposed. For more, see Acol. The essence of his idea is that you can play both strong twos (packaged into 2♣ and 2♦) and weak majors in the same system. Benjamin described the system in less than a page of Bridge Magazine, and it became at least as popular amongst tournament players as traditional Acol.

Benjamin loved to bring on younger players, and encouraged many who became fine players, such as Michael Rosenberg and Barnet Shenkin, who both became professional players in the United States. He died in Glasgow at the age of 96, in 2006.
