= Bridge World Standard =

Bidding system in the card game contract bridge

Bridge World Standard (BWS) is a bidding system in the card game contract bridge, first developed and serially published in 1967–69 as BWS 1968 by The Bridge World magazine. Like the Standard American Yellow Card (SAYC), it was intended "for use by impromptu or casual partnerships" and "as a basis for discussion by those who wish to formulate their own system."

The system was updated as the BWS 1984, BWS 1994, BWS 2001 and BWS 2017 editions. It is based on majority preferences of polled experts and readers of the magazine.

The system shares some similarities with Standard American and 2/1 game forcing, but with many advanced treatments.
