= Paul Lukacs =

Hungarian-Israeli polymath

Paul Lukacs (born Lukács Pàl; Hebrew: פאול לוקאץ'; 23 April 1918 – 1982) was a Hungarian-Israeli mathematician, analyst and composer of problems in the "play of the hand" at contract bridge. Some consider him "the best bridge player ever away from the table", as defined by Victor Mollo. He specialized in single dummy problems.

Lukacs was born in Rimaszombat, Kingdom of Hungary, Austria-Hungary (now Rimavská Sobota, Slovakia) in 1918, the son of Friedrich Lukács and Katrine Grünwald. He later moved to Budapest and was part of a boom of brilliant bridge players in Central Europe. His Austrian Wunderteam won four European titles in six years from 1932–37. But the Jewish Lukacs was forced to flee Europe in 1939 to escape Nazism, immigrating to Palestine. He was first placed in a detention camp for illegal immigration, but managed to stay despite an order of deportation. However, he then struggled to find bridge players worthy of his caliber.

Single dummy problems simulate the task that declarer faces in playing a bridge hand. Besides his hand he sees only dummy and has to make the best plan to make the contract, based on inferences from the bidding and from the opponents play. The single dummy problem reflects the challenges encountered by a declarer when dummy is tabled. In some single dummy problems the solver is required to look for a line of play which works for all possible distributions, while in others he has to find the plan which has the maximum success probability. Top players are often excellent single dummy problem solvers.

He contributed regularly to the leading journal The Bridge World and wrote several problem books well known in bridge literature. His most lasting contribution to bridge literature was as co-author of Spotlight on Card Play (with Robert Darvas), the first post-war problem collection to highlight expert thought processes.

He died in Tel Aviv in 1982.

== Publications ==
- Darvas, Robert; Lukacs, Paul (1960). Spotlight on Card Play (1st ed.). New York: Barclay.
- The second book of bridge problems: Single Dummy Plays, Ewart Kempson and Lukacs (Nicholas Vane, London, 1962)
- Third Pocket Book of Bridge Problems: Improve your dummy play, Eric C. Milnes and Lukacs (Kaye & Ward, London, 1969)
- The Fourth Collection of Interesting Bridge Problems: Bridge Hands for the Connoisseur, Eric Milnes and Lukacs (Kaye & Ward, London, 1974)
- Test Your Play as Declarer, Lukacs and Jeff Rubens (Hart, 1977)
- Learn to Play Bridge, Milnes and Lukacs (Kaye & Ward, 1977)
- Test Your Play as Declarer: Volume 2, Jeff Rubens and Lukacs (Devyn Press, 1982)

== See also ==
- Bridge probabilities
