= Polish Club =

Contract bridge bidding system

Polish Club (Polish: Wspólny Język, literally "Common Language") is a bridge bidding system which was developed in Poland, where it is the most popular bidding system, and which is also used by players of other countries. It is a type of small club system.

In the Polish Club, a 1♣ opening bid is forcing for one round but does not necessarily show a strong hand; in most versions of this system it shows either a weak balanced hand (about 12-14HCP), a natural 1♣ opening or any strong hand. Consequently, bids of 1♦, 1♥ and 1♠ are limited to about 18HCP, and also 1♦ shows at least four diamonds (five in some versions of the system).

The 2♣ opening is usually reserved to show a limited hand with long clubs and possibly a four-card major, similar to the Precision 2♣ opening.

The following outline of the system is based on that given in System licytacyjny Wspólny Język 2005 - opis skrócony ("Polish Club 2005 - a brief description") by Krzysztof Jassem. The latest version translated into English (Polish Club International, 2010), is available here:

== 1♣ opening ==
1. 12–14 HCP, no 5-card major, no 4-card diamond suit. Five clubs are possible if the hand is balanced. Opener should not bid clubs on the next round – even in competition.
2. 15–17 HCP, five clubs, unbalanced distribution. Opener bids clubs in the next round.
3. 18+ HCP, any distribution.

=== 1♦ response ===
1. negative: 0–8 HCP. In the 7–8 HCP range, Responder should not have a 4-card major (the response of one of a major is 7+ HCP, the 1NT response is 9–11 HCP).
2. 9–11 unbalanced; either both minors (5-4), or one poor minor. (The hand does not qualify for any of the responses: 1NT, 2 in a minor, 3 in a minor).
3. 12–16 HCP balanced without a 4-card major. The hand is not suitable for declaring no trumps.

1♣ - 1♦
?
1♥/1♠ = better major (3 cards is possible)
1NT = 18–19 HCP, balanced
2♣ = 15+ HCP, natural
2♦ = artificial GF, exclusive of 2-suiter hands
2♥, 2♠, 3♣, 3♦ = 5+ in the bid suit, semi-forcing
2NT = 22–24 HCP, balanced
3♥/3♠/4♣ = GF, 2-suiter (5-5):
3♥ – with hearts, then Responder’s 3♠ shows preference over hearts, 3NT asks for a minor, 4♣, 4♦ are cue bids with agreed hearts, 3♠ – spades and a minor, then 3NT asks for a minor, 4♣, 4♦ are cue bids, 4♣ – minors.

=== 1♥/1♠ responses ===
7+HCP, 4+ cards, can have longer minor if less than GF

1♣ - 1♥/1♠
?
2♣ = 15+, one-round force, then Responder’s 2♦ forces to game.
2♦ = Relay, 18+ HCP, promises at least 3 cards in Responder’s major.
2♥ = (After 1♠ response) 5+♥, (18+ HCP), GF
2NT = 18+ HCP, (semi-)balanced, denies 3-card support in Responder’s suit.
After 1♣-1♥/1♠-2♦, Responder bids as follows ("Bubrotka"):
2♥ = 7–10 HCP, 4 cards in the bid major
2♠ = 11+ HCP, 4 cards in the bid major
2NT = 11+ HCP, at least 5 cards in the bid major
3♣, 3♦ = 9–11 HCP, 5 in the bid minor, 4 in the bid major
3♥ = 7–10 HCP, 5 cards, unbalanced (then 3♠ asks for a shortage, 3NT asks for a side suit)
3♠ = 7–10 HCP, 5332 with 5 in the bid major
3NT = 7–10 HCP, 6 cards in the bid major

=== 1NT response ===
9–11 HCP, no 4-card major

1♣ - 1NT
?
2♣ = natural, 15+ HCP, GF
2♦, 2♥, 2♠ = 5+ cards, 18+ HCP, GF

=== 2♣/2♦ responses ===
5+ cards, GF, can have 4-card major

=== 2♥/2♠ responses ===
Strong jump shift (semi-solid suit)

=== 2NT response ===
12+ HCP, GF no 4-card major

=== 3♣/3♦ response ===
Good 6-card suit, invitational (9–11 HCP)

=== 3♥/3♠ responses ===
7-card suit with 2 high honours, nothing outside

== 1♦ opening ==
4+ cards, 12–17 HCP possible canape: 4 diamonds; 5 clubs are possible if weak (12–14 HCP)

- 2♣ response – natural, promises 5 clubs, one-round force. Rebidding diamonds by Opener shows length (5 diamonds) and does not specify strength. The other 2-level bids show 4-card openings in the range of 12–14 HCP.
- 2♦ response – inverted minor, 10+ HCP, 4 diamonds
- 3♦ response – preemptive
- NT responses: 1NT = 7–10 HCP, 2NT = 11–12 HCP; both deny a 4-card major.

== 1♥/1♠ openings ==
5 cards, 12–17 HCP

- 1NT Response – not forcing

Responder's 2NT is forcing after the suit is repeated. 1♥ 1♠/1NT 2♥ 2NT = forces to 3 of a major; opener shows shortage, and 1♠ 1NT 2♠ 2NT = forces to 3 of a major; opener shows shortage Two-over-one response – forces to three of that suit.

- 2♣ response is semi-natural.

Rebidding the suit by Opener shows a minimum and does not show length. 2NT rebid by Opener shows strength (15–17 HCP).

- 2NT response – limit raise with support
- Jump raise – preemptive

Two types of Splinter bids 1♥ - 3♠ = any shortage, 9–12 HCP (then 3NT asks shortage) 1♠ - 3NT = any shortage, 9–12 HCP (then 4♣ asks shortage) 1♥ - 3NT = spade shortage, 12–16 HCP 1♥/1♠ - 4♣, 4♦, 4♥ (after 1♠) = bid shortage, 12–16 HCP Drury-fit by a passed hand 2 of the bid major is the weakest rebid. Jump shift by a passed hand – invitational (9–11 HCP)

== 1NT opening ==
15–17 HCP

- Stayman 2♣

Opener's 2♥ does not deny four spades. Responder's subsequent bidding is natural: forcing at the 3-level, non-forcing at the 2-level. Also: 1NT - 2♣; 2♦ - 2♠ = invitational (7–9 HCP), 5 spades, 4 hearts, and 1NT - 2♣; 2♥/2♠ - 3♦/3♥ = transfer, agrees Opener's suit, GF

- Jacoby transfers 2♦/2♥

Transfer to hearts (2♦) does not deny five spades. Responder's new suit at the 3-level forces to game. Also: 1NT - 2♦; 2♥ - 2♠ forces to 3♥ (8+ HCP)

- 2♠ response – transfer for clubs. Opener may choose between a positive 2NT, and a negative 3♣. Responder may continue by showing shortage.
- 2NT response – limit
- 3♣ response – transfer to diamonds, weak or strong Opener is obliged to bid 3♦. Responder may continue by showing shortage.
- 3♦ – natural, inviting
- 3♥/3♠ – 5431 convention: GF, both minors: at least 5-4, shortage in the bid suit

== 2♣ opening ==
Precision: 5 clubs and a 4−card major, or 6 clubs, 11–14 HCP

- 2♦ response – relay, forcing to 3♣. Opener shows a 4-card suit (3♦ shows extras) or makes a choice between 2NT and 3♣ with long clubs.
- 2♥/2♠ response – not forcing, good 5-card suit (7–11 HCP)
- 2NT response – weak support in clubs or GF two-suiter. Puppet to 3♣. Opener must bid 3♣. Responder either passes or shows his suits: 3♦ = diamonds and hearts, 3♥ = hearts and spades 3♠ = spades and diamonds.
- 3♣ response – limit raise (invitational)
- 3♦/3♥/3♠ response – limit, good 6-card suit

== 2♦ opening ==
Weak two in a major (limited Multi), 6+ cards, 6–11 HCP.

- 2♥/2♠/3♥/3♠ response – pass or correct
- 2NT – relay, forcing to 3 of the major

Opener bids: 3♣ = good opening, 3♦ relays and 3♥ shows spades. 3♠ shows hearts. 3♦ = hearts, minimum opening 3♥ = spades, minimum opening

- 3♣ response – GF, any one-suited hand, puppet to 3♦.
- 3♦ – game-invitational with support in both majors

Opener bids 4♣ with hearts and 4♦ with spades if the invitation is accepted.

- 4♣ response – asks Opener to bids the suit below his major. Opener bid 4♦ with hearts and 4♥ with spades.
- 4♦ response – asks Opener to bids his suit.
- 4♥/4♠ response – to play

== 2♥/2♠ openings ==
Polish two−suiters, 6–11 HCP.

- Opening 2♥ = any 5-5 with hearts (spades possible)
  - 2♠ response = pass or correct
  - 2NT response – asks for another suit. With hearts and spades Opener bids 3♥. Other responses – natural
- Opening 2♠ = 5 spades and 5 of a minor

== 2NT opening ==
5-5 in minor, 6-11HCP.

- 3♥ asks to bid a longer minor or a longer major if minors are equal.
- 3♠ – natural, forcing

== 3NT opening ==
Gambling (no stopper outside)

- 4♦ asks for singleton.

== Conventions in an uncontested auction ==
=== Jump shift ===
Strong, semi−solid suit, slam interest

=== Fourth suit ===
Invites to game after an initial one-over-one response. Responder may pass in the subsequent bidding but Opener may not. Fourth suit forces to game after a two-over-one response.

=== Third suit ===
If Opener raises the third suit, that promises four cards in the suit and denies a stopper in the unbid suit. 3NT bid by Opener shows four cards in the third suit and promises a stopper in the unbid suit.

=== Forcing 2NT ===
Responder's 2NT is forcing after a two-over-one response.

=== Odwrotka ===
After a 1♣ opening and a response in a major, 2♦ is Odwrotka (a "fit reverse"), that shows an 18+ hand, a fit, and asks responder to describe his hand. Jassem recommends replacing WJ2000's "Odwrotka" with the "Bubrotka" responses above.

=== 2♣ – check back ===
Weak with clubs or game invitational, or game forcing Opener's rebids:

- 2♦ = minimum opening, no 3-card support
- 2 in Responder's suit = minimum opening, 3-card support
- 2 in the other major = nice opening, 3-card support
- 2NT = nice opening, no 3-card support

Responder's continuations: 3♣ signs off. 2 in the bid major is non-forcing (10–12 HCP). Other bids (including 2NT) are game forcing.

=== En passant ===
In an uncontested auction, stoppers are shown. In competition, bidding the opponent's suit asks for a stopper. If opponents bid two suits, bidding the higher-level suit promises stopper in the lower-level suit.

== Slam bidding ==
=== Roman Key Card Blackwood 1430 ===
5♣ = 1 or 4, 5♦ = 0 or 3, 5♥ = 2 or 5 no trump queen, 5♠ = 2 and a trump queen, etc.

=== Exclusion Key Card Blackwood (1430 responses) ===
After trump agreement, an unusual jump shift at the 5-level (or 4♠ when hearts are agreed) asks for key cards, exclusive of the ace of the bid suit.

=== Hoyt ===
The cheapest bid after key cards are shown asks for kings. The next cheapest bid shows no kings, etc.

=== 5NT ===
Kind of Josephine; asks for the number of high honours (ace, king or queen) in trumps 6♣ = 0, 6♦ = 1, etc.

=== Cue bids ===
First− and second−round controls are treated as equals

=== Splinter bids ===
Weaker and stronger types after 1♥/1♠ openings 1♥ – 3♠ = weaker Splinter (9–12 HCP), any shortage, 3NT asks 1♥ – 3NT = regular Splinter (12–16 HCP), spade shortage 1♠ – 3NT = weaker Splinter, any shortage, 4♣ asks 1♥/1♠ – 4♣/4♦/4♥ = regular Splinters (12–16 HCP)

=== AutoSplinter ===
An unusual shift jump agrees bidder's own suit only if partner has not shown any suit.

=== Six in the Splinter suit ===
Asks partner to bid the grand slam with a void in the splinter-suit.

=== Interference after Blackwood ===
DOPI. Double = 0, pass = 1, the cheapest bid = 2 keycards, etc.

== Competitive bidding ==
=== Over opponent’s takeout double ===
- Jump shift – suit and support (fit showing jump)
- New suit – forcing at 1-level (except 1♦; see below), non-forcing at 2-level
- Redouble = 10+ HCP

Opener bids before Responder: this shows a minimum if the bid is cheaper than two in the opening bid, but shows extras otherwise.

- 1♦ response over opponent's double – natural, not forcing
- Support bidding after partner's 1♥/1♠ opening is doubled:
  - 1NT = 7–9(10) HCP; 3-card support
  - 2NT = limit raise: 4-card support
  - Jump shift shows suit and support.

=== Over opponent’s overcall ===
- New suit is forcing at the level of 1 and 3. New suit is not forcing at the level of 2.
- Jump raise is pre-emptive.

=== Support bidding after partner’s 1♥/1♠ opening is overcalled ===
2NT promises good support (usually 4 cards) and forces to game. Direct cue bid is game-invitational, or game forcing with flat distribution and defensive values.

=== After partner’s 1NT opening is overcalled ===
- Double is negative – part score range.
- New suit is non-forcing at the two-level, but forcing at the three-level.
- Lebensohl: either GF with 4 cards in the other major or non-forcing with an unbid suit.

=== After partner’s 2♦/2♥/2♠ opening is overcalled ===
- New suit = pass or correct.
- Double is for penalties.

=== Negative double ===
Through 4♦ Negative doubles include, apart from standard agreements, forcing hands with a weak 5-card suit and – after 1♥/1♠ opening – invitational no-trump hands.

=== When the second defender overcalls ===
- Support double. A support double does not show extras but promises offensive values.
- After a 1♣ opening, double is two-way: either a support double or a stronger variant of the opening.

== Defensive bidding ==
=== No−trump hands ===
- 1NT and 2NT non-jump overcalls – 15–18 HCP with a stopper. Subsequent bidding: the same as after a 1NT opening
- 1NT re-opening – 12–15 HCP. Subsequent bidding: the same as after a 1NT opening
- 2NT re-opening – 19–21 HCP Subsequent bidding: similar to after the 1NT opening
- Jump overcalls – direct: natural, pre−emptive; re−opening: constructive
- Takeout doubles and strong doubles (17+HCP). Takeout doubles promise three cards in unbid majors and two cards in unbid minors. Equal level conversion shows extras.
- After partner has doubled 1♣, a 1♦ bid is negative, other 1-level suit bids are forcing.

=== After 2♦ artificial opening (Multi or Wilkosz) ===
Second hand's double is for takeout of spades. Pass and then double after 2♥/3♥ in the next round is for takeout of hearts:

2♦ dble 2♥ dble = responsive
2♦ dble 2♠ dble = punitive

Fourth hand's live double is for takeout:

2♦ pass 2♥/2♠ dble = takeout of hearts/spades respectively

=== Direct cue bid ===
Michaels cue bid – unlimited

=== Jump cue bid ===
Jump cue bid shows either a solid suit and asks for a stopper or shows any game-forcing one-suiter hand.

=== Versus strong 1 NT opening ===
- Double shows two suits: 5+ cards in a minor, 4+ cards in a major.
- 2♣ = major two-suiter
- 2♦ = 6+ card in one major
- 2♥/2♠ = 5 cards in the bid suit and a 4-card minor

=== Versus weak 1NT opening ===
Double is for takeout. Other bids show the same shape as versus a strong no trump and promise opening values.

=== Other ===
- Drury (2♣) promises fit, rebidding the suit is weakest bid.
- Lebensohl after 2♥/2♠ and partner's double

== Leads and signals ==
- Leads are 2nd best from bad suits (low from two); 4th best from good suits; top of honours; ace from ace-king, king from king- -queen, etc., except 9 from 109x(x).
- Signals are upside down throughout. In partner's led suit, count is preferred in suit contracts, attitude is preferred in no trump contracts.
- Echo against no trump contracts – a small card in declarer's first-played suit (from either hand) accepts the lead. Lavinthal – standard way (discouraging in the suit discarded, suit preference for the other 2 suits).
