= Norman four notrump =

Norman four notrump (also Norman) is a slam bidding convention in the partnership card game contract bridge designed to help the partnership choose among the five-, six-, and seven-levels for the final contract. Norman four notrump is an alternative to the Blackwood convention family.

Used when the contract level can be better determined by knowing the numbers of aces and kings that are "missing" in the partnership's two hands, the convention is initiated by a bid of 4NT to ask that partner provide information about his ace and king holdings. The response is coded to enable inference about the precise numbers of aces and kings in the replying hand.

The Norman scale, where an ace counts as one control and a king as half a control, is the basis of the following responses to the 4NT asking bid:

5♣: 0 to 1 controls indicating either (a) no aces or kings, or (b) one or two kings or (c) one ace
5♦: 1½ controls indicating either (a) one ace and one king or (b) three kings
5♥: 2 controls indicating either (a) two aces or (b) one ace and two kings or (c) four kings
5♠: 2½ controls indicating either (a) one ace and three kings or (b) two aces and a king
5NT : 3 controls indicating (a) one ace and four kings or (b) two aces and two kings or (c) three aces
6♣: 3½ controls indicating either (a) two aces and three kings or (b) three aces and one king
etcetera

Norman 4NT was a component of the Vienna System developed in the 1930s and the sixth edition of The Official Encyclopedia of Bridge of 2001 noted that it "once was popular in England, where it is credited to Norman de Villiers Hart and Sir Norman Bennet."

Some later conventions show aces and kings in one hand by one bid, using the same or comparable scale, such as Blue Team replies to opening 1♣ and similar responses to opening 2♣, strong and artificial. The San Francisco convention gave kings one-third the weight of aces, for greater accuracy at the cost of using more bidding space.

As slam bidding conventions at or near the 4NT level, Norman and San Francisco have been superseded by the Blackwood convention and its variants, which show at once only the number of aces or keycards, and show kings subsequently if at all.
