= San Francisco convention =

The San Francisco convention (sometimes called the Warren convention after an otherwise-unknown American bridge player with that surname) is a slam seeking convention in the game of contract bridge. It was devised in the 1930s, but soon became obsolete. The convention is of the type where one partner bids four notrump as an artificial inquiry, and the other partner shows high cards (aces and kings) using an agreed set of codified responses. (The Blackwood convention and its variants have since the 1930s been the best-known example of this type.)

In the Blackwood convention family, aces (and in many variants the king of the agreed suit also) are treated as equal. The San Francisco convention uses a different approach. Responder to four notrump allots three points to each ace held and one point to each king, adds those values up, and bids thus:

- 5♣ : 0-2 points
- 5♦ : 3 points
- 5♥ : 4 points
- 5♠ : 5 points
- 5NT : 6 points
- and so on

Some of the responses are ambiguous. For example, 5♣ may show either zero or one or two kings; and 5♦ may show either one ace or three kings. Other responses are precise. For example, 5♠ can only show one ace and two kings.

A more modern version of the San Francisco convention attempts to address the space issue in two ways. First, responder allocates two points to each ace held, not three. Second, the range of the initial bid varies with the strength of the hand being asked. Each step thereafter still represents one additional point. Thus:

- 5♣ : 0 points, if a known weak hand, 0-4 if a known strong hand, and otherwise 0-2 points.
- 5♦ : 1 point, 5 points, or 3 points respectively.

There are additional follow up schemes for asking about specific aces. There does not appear to be a consistent enough standard to include them as part of the convention.
