= Säffle Spade =

Forcing pass-opening system

In the game of contract bridge, Säffle Spade (or Säfflespader in Swedish) is a forcing pass-opening system developed by Einar Bergh and Pontus Svinhufvud; Säffle is a small city in Sweden where they once lived. There are at least three variants of the system: Super Säffle Spade (most advanced), Small Säffle Spade, and Small Happy Säffle Spade (simplest).

== Treatment ==
Opening bids of Pass and 1♣

While the opening bid of Pass is forcing for one round, it does not promise a very strong hand. The basic idea is that all hands (except certain pre-emptive ones) with 8 or more high card points (HCP) and 4+♠ are opened with a Pass (may also contain a longer side-suit). If one has 8 or more HCP and no ♠ suit, but 4 or more ♥, one opens 1♣ (may also contain a longer minor suit).

The general rationale is that when you open very low, you want to hold and show the major suits, so opponents cannot easily pre-empt against you. Another advantage is that when you have 8 or more HCP you often tell partner immediately which major suit(s) you do not have, and when he sees that your side cannot have any major-suit fit, if appropriate, he can quickly pre-empt with a minor-suit bid.

Other opening bids in the system

- 1♦ is used on all weak hands, 0-7 HCP.
- 1♥ shows 8 or more HCP and an unbalanced hand with no major (or 22 or more HCP, a balanced hand with no major).
- 1♠ is "mini-notrump" with 8-12 HCP — denying a 4-card or longer major
- 1NT shows 13-18 HCP — denying a 4-card or longer major
- 2NT shows 19-21 HCP — denying a 4-card or longer major.
- 2♣/2♦/2♥ show 4 or more cards in the suit bid plus a 5-card or longer major side-suit.
- 2♠ shows any solid suit (AKQxxxx).
- Higher openings are normal pre-empts.

Today, the system is illegal in most competitions, since a "Pass" opening now may not be used to indicate strength. In the 1970s/1980s when it was invented and actively played, such regulations were rare.
