= EHAA =

Bidding system

EHAA (Every Hand An Adventure) is a highly natural bidding system in contract bridge characterized by four-card majors, sound opening bids, undisciplined weak two-bids in all four suits and a mini notrump, usually of 10–12 high card points.

== Weak two-bids ==
An EHAA two-bid shows six to twelve high card points, and a five card or longer suit. There are no restrictions on suit quality (xxxxx and AKQJxxxx both qualify). EHAA bidders use a "get in quick, get out quick" style, which permits interference or an opening bid in nearly every auction, protected by fairly strict requirements on further bids by the partnership. EHAA two-bids are made in all four suits; there is no forcing opening bid in EHAA.

Responses to the EHAA two bid fall into three categories. All jump bids are forcing to game and slam invitational, because any hand which could force to game opposite a minimum EHAA two-bid must be interested in slam opposite a maximum. (However, a direct jump to game is a two-way bid, and opener is expected to pass.) A nonjump bid in a new suit is a nonforcing and nonconstructive attempt to improve the contract. Finally, 2NT or a raise of the opening bid shows 14 to 17 high card points, and is invitational to game; a raise shows three card support or better, and 2NT denies three card support. (If responder has an invitational hand without support, but cannot abide opener's possible pass of 2NT, he must guess whether to bid game or not.)

After an EHAA two-bid, delicate game bidding is not possible; this is one of the disadvantages of the system. If responder holds 12 or 13 points, he cannot raise, though game might be possible if opener has a maximum. Lowering the point range for a raise could solve this difficulty, at the considerably greater expense of risk when opener has a bad minimum.

Notice that responder cannot further the preempt, in accord with the "get in quick, get out quick" strategy of the EHAA two-bid. Responder can escape from opener's suit, however, by correcting to a new suit. This shows that responder has at least four cards more in his suit than he does in opener's suit. Opener can correct to a third suit or back to his original, with a similar meaning. Both partners must be aware that the combined assets of the partnership may be extremely weak, and should be ready to stop at the earliest opportunity. Neither partner may raise a suit bid by the other; the partnership is already known to be limited.

Systemically, any hand meeting the requirements for an EHAA two-bid must be opened as such. EHAA two-bids are also used as overcalls, but of course are not obligatory. Considerations of safety and vulnerability must then come into play.

If the opponents bid over the two-bid, responder need not have the ability to take out opener's bid to his own suit, and so all new suit bids in such a context become constructive and show values, though still nonforcing.

If the opponents have shown opening bid values (either with a takeout double or because they opened the bidding), jump raises of 2♣ and 2♦ show game invitational hands stronger than a simple raise would. (Because a takeout double could be passed for penalties, however, it is still necessary for responder's new suit response to be nonconstructive after a double.)

== Mini notrump ==
EHAA uses a ten to twelve notrump range; the distribution must be 4-3-3-3 or 4-4-3-2. On occasion, a 5-3-3-2 hand with a long minor can be opened 1NT if the values are concentrated in the short suits.

Opposite the mini notrump, there is no reason to use transfers or many of the other accoutrements of standard notrump systems. Accordingly, 2♦, 2♥, 2♠, and 3♣ are nonconstructive improvements of the contract. Holding minimal values and a five card suit, responder should take out 1NT almost automatically. Responder passes with no five card suit, or with enough values to make 1NT a likely possibility.

With five-five or better in the minors, responder bids 2NT, and opener rebids his better minor. Responder passes with a minimum, and raises for a game try.

Responder can also raise to 3NT, 4NT, 5NT, 6NT, and 7NT, with their standard meanings.

For game invitational hands, whether they have a four card major or not, responder bids 2♣ Stayman. Opener's rebids are standard, except with two four card majors opener rebids 2NT with a minimum and 3♣ with a maximum. (For this reason, responder cannot use "garbage Stayman".) After opener's rebids, a new suit by responder shows a five card suit; bids at the two level are invitational and bids at the three level are forcing to game.

All suit bids of 3 ♦ or higher are used as preemptive bids. It is this ability of responder to preempt with a six card suit and no values which makes the EHAA mini notrump itself a preemptive bid.

If 1NT is doubled, some sort of escape system may be used. It is suggested that all two bids (even 2♣) are to be intended to play; redouble by responder is SOS. Some play that with a good hand, responder passes and opener must redouble, which responder will pass for penalties or take out showing invitational values or better (although this is not common).

== Other opening bids ==
EHAA users normally play four card majors. Opening one bids show a full thirteen high card points (opening lighter is not necessary because the EHAA two-bid is available). All the usual sorts of conventions after opening bids in a suit are available. The ranges on NT rebids are 13-15 (cheapest NT), 16-18 (jump in NT), 19-20 (rebid 3NT).

Because 2♣ is not available as a forcing opening, 2NT and 3NT must have wider ranges. Appropriate is for 2NT to show 21–24, reserving 3NT for 25+ points. Typical responses are used over 2NT (transfers, stayman, etc.). Because there is no forcing opening bid in EHAA, openers may tend to stretch to open 2NT on somewhat off-shape hands. This makes the use of Puppet Stayman particularly important.

The only hand with ten points or more which is passed in EHAA is a 4-4-4-1 distribution. Accordingly, by a passed hand a jump shift shows a mini-splinter, and a limit raise shows specifically a 4-4-3-2 with a weak doubleton and good trumps and nine points.

== Defensive bidding ==
EHAA defensive bidding does not distinguish between jump and non-jump overcalls, and instead focuses on the level of the overcall. All one-level overcalls show five card suits and thirteen high card points; all two-level overcalls show EHAA two bids.

In a suit where a one-level overcall is not available, a three-level overcall shows a good six-card suit, six or seven losers, and thirteen points. Some hands may not qualify for such an intermediate jump overcall, and must be overcalled with an overheavy two-bid.

Takeout doubles are played normally, but because of the greater strength of overcalls, a takeout double need not be made to show a very strong one-suited hand. System users therefore normally play that to double and bid again does not show extra values, but instead shows 6-4 distribution.

Overcalls of 1NT are played as in standard bidding, showing a strong notrump range of perhaps 15 to 17 HCP. Those who like Stayman and Jacoby transfers after notrump overcalls can use them here as well.

Two-suited takeouts (unusual notrump or Michaels cuebids, for example) are used in standard bidding with either weak or strong hands. Standard bidding counsels to overcall and rebid in the second suit with an intermediate two-suited hand. In EHAA, the weak hands are overcalled with a two-bid, and so two-suited takeouts should be used only with strong five loser / 15 HCP hands.

== Other preempts ==
EHAA bidders open three and four level preempts extremely light, and with tightly defined strength. As a rule, any hand which qualifies for a two-bid should not be opened with a preempt below the game level.

At the three level, nonvulnerable preempts show six card suits or longer, and seven if vulnerable. With unfavorable vulnerability, the preemptor should have five or six losers; six or seven with both vulnerable; seven or eight with neither vulnerable; and eight or nine with favorable vulnerability.

Preempts at the four level promise at least one card more in length and one fewer loser.
