= Strong pass =

Opening pass in bridge

In the card game of bridge, a strong pass is an opening pass that indicates a strong hand, typically with a minimum of 11–16 points. Strong pass bidding systems are of a quite different nature from the more typical "natural" systems, but share some similarities with strong club systems. Strong pass systems are sometimes called "forcing pass" systems; the term "strong pass" is preferred here to avoid confusion with a different meaning of the term "forcing pass" in bridge.

== Features ==
Since "pass" is used to indicate strong hands, weaker hands—even those with no points—must make an opening bid. Typically, one bid is used for extremely weak hands (less than 8 or 9 points); this is called a "fert" bid (short for fertilizer, as it is used when your hand is a load of manure). All other bids show limited-strength hands of various distributions. The fert bid is usually between 1♣ and 1♠; higher bids are more preemptive, but correspondingly more dangerous. Because of the necessity of using a fert bid, the limited openings usually have a significantly lower range than in strong-club systems, and very weak preemptive bids on the 2 and 3 levels are allowed.

The basic motivation of strong pass systems is to reserve as much bidding room as possible for strong hands, and to be as preemptive as is safely possible with weak hands. Strong pass systems are often coupled with relay systems for precisely describing strong hands, and limited bids are heavily oriented towards finding low-level major-suit contracts, with "major-suit" bids (i.e. bids that promise a certain major-suit holding, which are not necessarily natural heart or spade bids — most strong-pass systems are highly artificial) typically promising only four cards in a particular major.

Note that a strong-pass partnership will always open the bidding when playing first position, or when second position after an opposing natural pass. Thus, partnerships playing against a strong pass system will be on defense much more often than normal, and must have highly developed defensive methods for handling situations where the partnership possesses game strength or more. As a result, strong-pass systems are typically prohibited at all but the highest levels of tournament play.

A sample strong-pass system is the TresBoof system. The outline of the opening bids of this system is as follows, with relative frequencies attached:

- Pass (21%): 14+, any shape.
- 1♣ (17%): 8-13, 4+ hearts, possibly longer minor, possibly 4-4 majors.
- 1♦ (16%): 8-13, 4+ spades, possibly longer minor.
- 1♥(11%): 0-8, any shape. Usually no 5-card suit except possibly clubs (since an off-shape weak two is safer, more descriptive, and more preemptive)
- 1♠ (10%): 9-13, balanced, no four-card major unless 4333.
- 1NT (3%): 9-13, 5+ diamonds, no four-card major. (Implies 6+ diamonds and/or 4 clubs).
- 2♣ (2%): 9-13, 5+ clubs, no four-card major. (Implies 6+ clubs and/or 4 diamonds).
- 2♦ (?): 4-8 weak 2 in major or 20-21 balanced, MULTI
- 2♥ (?): 4-8 hearts + minor
- 2♠ (?): 4-8 spades + another suit
- 2NT (0.3%): 8-12, 5-5 or more in minors.
- 3NT (0.2%): 8-13, solid 7-card or 8-card minor.

Note that 1♣ and 1♦ are "transfer openings"; if responder has a strong hand, he accepts the transfer by bidding 1♥ or 1♠ (respectively), initiating a relay sequence.

== Restrictions ==
According to the World Bridge Federation System Policy, a system is classified as a Highly unusual method (HUM) if "a Pass in the opening position shows at least the values generally accepted for an opening bid of one, even if there are alternative weak possible interpretations of the pass" or "by partnership agreement an opening bid at the one level may be weaker than pass." Thus, strong pass systems are classified as HUM and allowed only on competitions of Bermuda Bowl/Venice Cup level, with additional provisions that the pair playing HUM method must submit their convention cards in advance, and their team loses the right to choose the opponents (i.e. they must seat first and let the opposing team select the lineup). HUM systems are banned altogether on lower-level competitions, especially on pairs events (as a round of 2-3 boards is too short to require all other players to prepare the defense against strong pass in advance). Sponsoring organizations on lower levels are permitted to impose lesser restrictions, but that is seldom the case; thus, the strong pass is mostly limited to world team competitions, special invitation tournaments and friendly games.

== See also ==
- Brown sticker
- Forcing pass
