= Jeff Rubens =

American contract bridge player and writer (born 1941)

Jeff Rubens (born 1941) is an American bridge player, editor, and writer of books including Secrets of Winning Bridge and Expert Bridge Simplified. He is best known for long association with The Bridge World monthly magazine, as co-editor under Edgar Kaplan from 1967 and as editor and publisher since Kaplan's death in 1997. Rubens is from Brooklyn, New York.

== Life ==
Rubens attended Stuyvesant High School in New York City, where he was captain of the math team in 1957, the year he graduated. He has an undergraduate degree from Cornell University and a graduate degree from Brandeis University. He won seven North American championship events in the 1960s-70s, represented North America in the 1973 world championship, and "gave up competitive bridge for family reasons" soon after.

Rubens is a retired professor of mathematics and computer science at Pace University in New York.

== Competition ==
Rubens became an ACBL Life Master at 20 and won two North American championship events (then called "national championships") at age 23 in 1965, the Men's Pairs and Men's Teams. Seven years later he played with B. Jay Becker on teams that won the 1972 Spingold national championship and the subsequent trial to represent North America in the world championship. Becker was 69, then the oldest participant in a Bermuda Bowl tournament, and famously conservative. According to Charles Goren's report,

Becker is an ultraconservative who has often refused to play even so widely accepted a convention as Stayman. Rubens, a math teacher, employs advanced ideas on everything from opening bids to opening leads. Expert selectors would have been hard-pressed to put together a less likely partnership. Yet from their base of operations in the closed room this pair kept sending through perfect results on hand after hand, a performance that even the vaunted Blue Team would have found difficult to top. Certainly their opponents in the Trials could not begin to match it.

At Guarujá, Brazil, they finished fourth of five teams in the 1973 Bermuda Bowl.

== Editor ==
Rubens and Paul Heitner established the short-lived Bridge Journal in the mid-1960s. It is best known for Journalist leads.

The Bridge World monthly was established by Ely and Josephine Culbertson in 1929. Edgar Kaplan acquired it from McCall Corporation in 1966 and served as publisher and editor from the January 1967 issue until his death in September 1997. Some time in 1967 he brought Rubens on board as co-editor. They made the editorial column a monthly and prominent feature.

== Bridge accomplishments ==
=== Honors ===
- ACBL Hall of Fame, Blackwood Award 2004

=== Awards ===
- Precision Award (Best Article or Series on a System or Convention) 1977, 1979, 1982

=== Wins ===
- North American Bridge Championships (3)
  - Spingold (1) 1972
  - Men's Board-a-Match Teams (1) 1965
  - Men's Pairs (1) 1965
- United States Bridge Championships (1)
  - Open Team Trials (1) 1972

== Publications ==
- Win at Poker (Funk & Wagnalls, 1968); reprint Dover Publications, 1984, ISBN 9780486246260
- Modern Bridge Bidding Complete: introducing the Roth point count (Funk & Wagnalls, 1968), Al Roth and Rubens
- The Secrets of Winning Bridge (Grosset & Dunlap, 1969)
- Bridge for Beginners (Funk & Wagnalls, 1970), Al Roth and Rubens
- Official rules of the Tarotrump card game (U.S. Games Systems, 1972), Stuart R. Kaplan and Rubens – [rules?] "by Stuart R. Kaplan; suggestions for strategy by Jeff Rubens" OCLC 220239633
- Test Your Play as Declarer (NY: Hart Pub, 1977), Paul Lukacs and Rubens
- The Bridge World magazine: Swiss match challenge (Oakland: Lawrence & Leong Pub, 1992)
- "Edgar Kaplan Remembered", The Bridge World [monthly], December 1997 to April 1998
- The Bridge World's Test your play (Master Point Press, 2001)

== See also ==
- Useful space principle
- Rubens advances
- Hand evaluation by visualization
