= Moscito =

Bridge system of the game of contract bridge

Moscito (Major Oriented Strong Club — Intermediate Two Openings or Intrepid Two Openings or In Trouble Often) is a contract bridge bidding system created by the Australian Bridge experts Paul Marston and Stephen Burgess in 1985. According to Marston, they switched from their strong pass system because of tightening restrictions on such systems pushed by American representatives on the World Bridge Federation.

Moscito is a strong club system with limited one and two openings like Precision club, but follows the MAFIA (Majors First Always) principle where 4+ card Majors are always opened before Minor suits, no matter how long. Moscito used the Symmetric Relay structure developed by Prof. Roy Kerr for slam bidding. In the original version a 1NT opening showed a 10-14 HCP hand with both Majors, but after unbalanced 1NT openings were banned by the WBF, transfer openings in the Majors were used instead. The Majors First was also relaxed for hands with a 4 card Major and 6+ card Minor suit.
