= Carrot Club =

Strong club system

Carrot Club (or Morotsklöver in Swedish) is a strong club system, developed in the 1970s and played in international teams championships by Danielle Nughes, Anders Morath and Sven-Olov Flodquist. They won the European teams championships in 1977 and placed third in the World teams championships in 1977 and 1991.

Some features of the system are a natural 4+card 1♦ opening, canapé-openings with longer ♣-suit, Carrot 1NT (a "wide" 1NT-opening showing 13–17 hcp; if 13–14, may not have a 4-card major), and the Carrot 4NT slam convention.
