= Blackwood convention =

Bidding convention in contract bridge

In the partnership card game contract bridge, the Blackwood convention is a bidding convention developed by Easley Blackwood in 1933 and still widely used in the modern game. Its purpose is to enable the partnership to explore its possession of aces, kings and in some variants, the queen of trumps to judge whether a slam would be a feasible contract. The essence of the convention is the use of an artificial 4NT bid made under certain conditions to ask partner how many aces he has; responses by partner are made in step-wise fashion to indicate the number held.

== Blackwood's original summary ==
After developing the concept in 1933, Easley Blackwood submitted an article proposing his slam-seeking convention to The Bridge World magazine but it was rejected. Nevertheless, it gained awareness and use amongst players and was written about by several authors. In his own first publication on the convention in 1949, Easley Blackwood comments on the entries in books by others and noted that "...in every one of these books, they have it wrong!" He pointed out several misconceptions and concluded with a fifteen-point summary of the "complete and official" Blackwood Slam Convention. A synopsis of that summary follows:

1. In order to make the 4NT ace-asking bid, you must first:
  1. think your partnership has sufficient strength for a slam,
  2. expect to be able to make at the five-level even if partner has no aces, and
  3. be prepared with a sound rebid no matter how partner responds
2. Partner's responses to the 4NT ace-asking bid are made in step-wise fashion:
  1. 5♣ to indicate 0 or 4 aces
  2. 5♦ to indicate 1 ace
  3. 5♥ to indicate 2 aces
  4. 5♠ to indicate 3 aces
3. When responding, do not count a void as an ace.
4. Generally, 4NT is ace-asking when your side has bid a suit. There are exceptions:
  1. when notrump has previously been bid by partner and he subsequently removes one's four-level suit bid to 4NT
  2. when a previous opportunity to employ 4NT as ace-asking has not been taken
5. When clubs are expected to be trumps, one must have at least two aces to employ 4NT ace-asking and when diamonds are to be trump, one must have at least one ace.
6. The 4NT bidder is only partial captain of the auction and responder has certain rights:
  1. the 4NT bidder sets the level of the contract but partner may correct the denomination
  2. when responder has a void in the suit in which he would convey, at the five-level, the number of aces he possesses, he may jump to six of the void suit to convey both the number of aces and the location of the void.
  3. when responder has a void and his ace-showing response is in a suit of lower rank than the trump suit, he first tells partner the number of aces he has. If partner signs-off at the five-level, responder may continue to slam if his holding justifies it.
7. If the 4NT bidder, after hearing partner's response, bids a previously unmentioned suit, responder must bid 5NT to end the auction.
8. An ace shown by a cuebid by either partner should not be counted in responding to the 4NT ace-asking bid.
9. A 5NT bid after a response to a 4NT ace-asking bid, asks for kings.
10. Partner's responses to the 5NT king-asking bid are made in step-wise fashion:
  1. 6♣ to indicate 0 kings
  2. 6♦ to indicate 1 king
  3. 6♥ to indicate 2 kings
  4. 6♠ to indicate 3 kings
  5. 6NT to indicate 4 kings
11. To ask for kings via 5NT, one must first ask for aces via 4NT even when possessing all four aces oneself.
12. A jump to 5NT without employing the 4NT ace-asking bid is the Culbertson Grand Slam Force and obliges partner to bid the grand slam if he holds two of the three top trumps and a small slam if he does not.
13. If the opponents interfere after the 4NT ace-asking bid, a Pass by responder indicates no aces, the suit one above the opponent's indicates one ace, two above indicates two and so on.
14. Except in duplicate, the king-asking 5NT bid assures partner possession of all four aces.
15. After a 5NT king-asking bid, neither partner is captain and either can set the final contract.

== Variations based on 4NT as asking ==
Several versions of Blackwood are available: Standard Blackwood, Roman Blackwood and Roman Key Card Blackwood (RKC or RKCB). All versions are initiated by a bid of four notrump (4NT), and the entire family of conventions may be called Blackwood 4NT in both versions, or Key Card 4NT in the key card variation.

There are other 4NT conventions, such as Culbertson 4-5 Notrump, Norman Four Notrump and San Francisco, but almost all bridge partnerships employ some member of the Blackwood family (which includes Byzantine Blackwood) as part of their slam-investigation methods.

If the partnership's preceding call is a natural bid in notrump, then 4NT is usually played as natural. Over an opposing pass it is simply a raise and a quantitative invitation to six notrump, a small slam. Over an intervening four of a suit by opponents it is usually played as a competitive raise, expecting to play four notrump. Those natural interpretations may hold in other auctions where the partnership has previously bid notrump naturally or shown a balanced hand conventionally. In some situations where 4NT is a quantitative invitation, especially where 4♣ is a jump, many partnerships use the Gerber convention instead of the Blackwood family: 4♣ asks for the number of aces or key cards.

Where both sides are bidding, 4NT is often played as a conventional takeout asking partner to help choose one of two or three suits, similar to a lower-level takeout double or cuebid reply to such a double.

=== Standard Blackwood ===
Where standard Blackwood 4NT is in force, a four notrump bid (4NT) asks partner to disclose the number of aces in his hand. With no aces or four, partner replies 5♣; with one, two, or three aces, 5♦, 5♥, or 5♠, respectively. The difference between no aces and four is clear to the Blackwood bidder (unless the partnership lacks all four) so one member of the partnership knows the combined number of aces. That is often sufficient to set the final contract. (A common agreement is that when spades is not the trump suit, 5♠ asks responder to bid 5NT. That is useful when the reply to 4NT bypasses the intended trump suit but also shows that slam is likely to be a poor contract because two aces are missing.)

The continuation bid of 5NT asks for the number of kings according to the same code of replies at the six-level: 6♣ shows no kings or four, etc. Asking for the number of kings confirms that the partnership holds all four aces, so partner may reply at the seven level with expectation of taking thirteen tricks.

A void may be as good as an ace in some situations but it should not be counted as an ace. Some experts (Kantar for one) recommend the 5NT reply to 4NT – the cheapest with no standard assigned meaning – to show a void plus two aces and six of a suit to show a void in the bid suit plus one ace.

=== Roman Blackwood ===
A variation of the standard Blackwood convention, known as Roman Blackwood, was popularized by the Italian Blue Team in the 1960s. In Roman Blackwood, the responses are more ambiguous, but more space-conserving. The basic outline of responses is:

5♣	– 0 or 3 aces
5♦	– 1 or 4 aces
5♥	– 2 aces

In practice, the ambiguity is unlikely to occur, as a strength difference between hands with 0 or 1 and 3 or 4 aces is big enough that it can be established in previous rounds of bidding. In other words, a partner who has previously shown, for example, 12-15 range of high points is unlikely to hold 3 aces for his bid, etc.

Even Roman Blackwood convention has several variations, revolving around 5♥ and 5♠ responses. In all variants, they denote 2 aces. One variation is that 5♠ shows extra values, while 5♥ does not. In other variations, responses 5♥ - 5NT denote specific combinations of aces (same color, same rank, or "mixed").

If the querying partner ascertains that all aces are present, he can continue as follows:

- 5NT is the Grand slam force
- The first available bid which is not the agreed suit is the Roman Blackwood for kings. The partner responds stepwise, as above.

=== Roman Key Card Blackwood (RKCB) ===
Roman Key Card Blackwood (RKCB) has largely replaced the standard version among tournament players. It developed from the Roman Blackwood variant (see above). According to RKCB there are five equivalent key cards rather than just the four aces: the trump king is counted as the fifth key card. The key card replies to 4NT are more compressed than standard ones and they also begin to locate the queen of trumps.

5♣	– 0 or 3 key cards
5♦	– 1 or 4 key cards
5♥	– 2 or 5 cards without the trump queen
5♠	– 2 or 5 key cards with the trump queen

Although the replies to 4NT are more compressed, it is almost always possible to infer which number of keycards is correct: 0 or 3, 1 or 4, 2 or 5. Evidence for that inference includes the entire auction as well as the number of key cards that the 4NT bidder holds.

The 5♥ and 5♠ replies with 2 or 5 key cards also deny and show the trump queen, respectively. (Responder may also show the queen with extra length in trumps, typically indicating a 10-card fit, where the ace and king will probably draw all outstanding cards in the suit.)

The 5♣ and 5♦ replies tell nothing about the queen or extra length, but the 4NT bidder may ask about that using the cheapest bid other than five of the trump suit. The code for replies to that "queen ask" vary; a common rule is that the cheapest bid in the trump suit denies the queen or extra length and any other call shows it. An option is for the positive calls to show a feature, such as a king in that suit, and 6 of the trump suit can show the queen of trumps with no outside kings.

Roman Key Card Blackwood is predicated on existence of a trump suit, which determines which of the four kings and queens responder should show as key cards. Trump agreement is not necessary, however. One common rule is that the last suit bid before 4NT bid is the key suit, lacking trump agreement.

Some partnerships use the club response to show 1 or 4 and the diamond response to show 3 or none, dubbed "1430" (coincidentally the score for making a vulnerable small slam in a major suit), with the original version being dubbed "3014" when distinction is necessary. In order to facilitate the Queen Ask, an experts' version has been developed, where "1430" is used by the strong hand and "3014" is used by the weak hand. There are specific rules which determine when the asker hand is the weak one and when it is the strong one.

=== Key Card Blackwood (KCB) ===
A half-way house between standard Blackwood and RKCB is Keycard Blackwood. Again there are five key cards, including the trump king, but unlike RKCB, the queen of trumps is not considered.

5♣ – 0 or 4 key cards
5♦ – 1 or 5 key cards
5♥ – 2 key cards
5♠ – 3 key cards

This is advocated by Bernard Magee as being simpler for club players, as with RKCB players are sometimes unsure whether partner holds 0 or 3 key cards, or 1 or 4.

== Variations not based on 4NT ==
=== Kickback ===
"Kickback" is the variant of RKCB devised by Jeff Rubens in accordance with the Useful Space Principle. The step responses are the same as in RKCB, but the ask is not necessarily 4NT. Instead it is the 4-level bid immediately above the agreed trump suit; i.e.:

4♦	– RKCB for clubs
4♥	– RKCB for diamonds
4♠	– RKCB for hearts
4NT	– RKCB for spades

Kickback has the advantage that it saves bidding space and, especially for minor-suit fits, provides safety at the 5-level if the required key cards are missing. Because the Kickback bid would otherwise be a control bid, 4NT is usually substituted as the control bid in that suit (e.g., 4NT is a control bid in hearts if the agreed trump suit is diamonds). The drawback is that in unpracticed partnerships there can be confusion as to whether a bid is Kickback, a control bid or preference for a different strain:

♠	A 3	W E	♠	K 10 6 4 2
♥	K 10 8 6 4 2	W E	♥	A
♦	K J 9 7	W E	♦	A Q 10 4
♣	8	W E	♣	A 5 3

West	East
1♥	1♠
2♥	3♦
4♦	4♥
Pass	

East intended 4♥ as Kickback, but West thought it was secondary support for hearts, and decided to pass with minimum values. As result, a reasonable grand slam in diamonds was missed.

An established partnership might have agreed that as hearts were not supported after opener's rebid, 4♥ cannot possibly show support, and must be ace asking in diamonds.

=== Redwood ===
"Redwood" is a variation of Kickback that is only used when a minor suit is trumps. A 4 level bid in the suit above the agreed trump suit is the ace / key card ask and the name comes from the fact that this bid will always be a red suit:

4♦– RKCB for clubs

4♥– RKCB for diamonds

Once key cards have been identified the next step bid (other than trumps) can be used to ask for Kings.

One advantage of this approach is that it avoids the potential for misunderstanding that can occur when using Minorwood but one disadvantage is that it uses up one more bid (than Minorwood) and might constrain the bidding later when asking for Kings or Queens.

Using "Redwood," the ace/key card ask of 4NT is still used when the trump suit is a major (hearts or spades).

=== Minorwood ===
"Minorwood" is a variation of Blackwood, in which the minor suit which the partners agree will be trumps is itself used as the ace/key card ask. The ask will be at the four level. Hence:

4♣– RKCB for clubs

4♦– RKCB for diamonds

One disadvantage to this convention is that either the partnership must agree to lose the natural 4 level bid in trumps or have clear agreement on which sequences are slam seeking and which are natural bids. The advantage of this approach is that it conserves bidding space. For example, the use of Redwood reduces the risk of a misunderstanding but uses up one more bid and might constrain the bidding later when asking for Kings or Queens.

=== Exclusion Blackwood ===
Exclusion Blackwood or Voidwood. was devised by Bobby Goldman as an attempt to resolve the situation when the Blackwood-asker has a void. In that case, he is not interested in the partner's ace in the void suit, as he already has the first-round control; partner's ace would present a duplicated value in that case. Many players, even experts, refuse to play Exclusion Blackwood because of the potential disaster of forgetting the agreement.

It is usually played as the Roman Key Card Blackwood, with only four key cards: the three Aces outside the void suit and the King of trumps. However, the asking bid is not 4NT, but the void suit — Voidwood is made by jumping on level 4 or 5 in the void suit after a fit has been found, for example:

West	East
1♠	3♠
5♣	

Bids of 5♣, 5♦ and 5♥ present a Voidwood, denoting the void in the suit bid and asking for other key cards. The responses are, as in RKCB:

- 1st step – 0 or 3 key cards (1 or 4, if playing 1430)
- 2nd step – 1 or 4 key cards (0 or 3)
- 3rd step – 2 key cards without trump queen
- 4th step – 2 key cards with trump queen

== See also ==
- Gerber convention
- Glossary of contract bridge terms
- Grand slam force
- Norman four notrump
- Quantitative no trump bids
- San Francisco convention
- Slam-seeking conventions
