= Culbertson 4-5 notrump =

Slam-seeking convention in contract bridge

The Culbertson 4-5 notrump is a slam-seeking convention in the game of contract bridge. It was devised in the early 1930s by Ely Culbertson. Most four-notrump conventions (Blackwood and its variants being the best known) demand that bidder's partner define their hand using agreed codified responses. In contrast, the Culbertson 4-5 describes the bidder's hand, and invites partner to use their judgement in the light of that information.

== Description ==
A bid of four notrump (subject to common-sense defined exceptions) shows either:

- Any three aces, or
- Two aces, and the king of any suit previously bid by either partner.

In response:

- A bid of five notrump shows either:
  - Any two aces, or
  - One ace, and the kings of all suits previously bid by either partner.
- A bid of a new suit shows first-round control (ace or void) there, but is not compulsory with such a holding.
- Six of a previously bid suit shows a desire to play there (holding one ace, or the kings of all bid suits).
- Five of the lowest-ranking suit bid by either partner is a conventional sign-off, denying the values to make any of the stronger bids.

If the four notrump bidder next bids five notrump, that shows all four aces.

A bid of five notrump not preceded by four notrump shows three aces and the king of a bid suit.

In subsequent bidding, common-sense rules apply.

== History ==
Culbertson's proposal of this convention threatened to disrupt the publication of the 1935 version of the Laws of Contract Bridge. The Portland Club, guardian of the laws in England, considered it equivalent to playing with exposed cards. Noel Mobbs persuaded the Club that they were wrong.

In his 1949 book Design for Bidding, "Skid" Simon called the Culbertson 4-5 "an adult weapon" and Blackwood "merely a nice toy".

The Culbertson 4-5 has been superseded by Blackwood and other conventions, but was reported in 1967 to still be popular among some leading British players.
