= Gerber convention =

Slam bidding convention in contract bridge

Gerber is a contract bridge convention devised by William Konigsberger and Win Nye from Switzerland who published it in 1936; John Gerber of Texas introduced it to North America in 1938 where it was named after him. It is similar to Blackwood but uses 4♣ instead of 4NT as a relay (asking) bid to inquire about the number of aces held by partner. A further relay bid may follow to inquire about the number of kings held.

Gerber is used primarily after notrump openings, responses, and rebids, making it a complement to Blackwood rather than a replacement. Some club players also use it after suit bidding, but most experts do not recommend this.

== Purpose ==
Because bidding and making a slam or grand slam contract in bridge gains significant bonus scoring points, partnerships will strive to bid them whenever their combined card assets are deemed sufficient. Knowing the number of aces and kings jointly held is usually crucial to this decision and Gerber is one of several bridge conventions used to ascertain the necessary information.

== Responses and continuations ==
The ace-asking bid is 4♣. The criteria for its application vary amongst users and alternatives are detailed below; likewise, a number of response schemes have been developed over the years. Partnership agreement is required on both matters.

=== Original response scheme ===
The original responses to the 4♣ asking bid are:

- 4♦ = 0 aces
- 4♥ = 1 ace
- 4♠ = 2 aces
- 4NT = 3 aces
- 5♣ = 4 aces

=== Modern response schemes ===
Most modern bridge literature recommend the following response scheme:

- 4♦ = 0 or 4 aces
- 4♥ = 1 ace
- 4♠ = 2 aces
- 4NT = 3 aces

However, some experts favour the following responses, analogous to Roman Blackwood:

- 4♦ = 0 or 3 aces
- 4♥ = 1 or 4 aces
- 4♠ = 2 aces

Other response structures have been devised along similar lines and partnership agreement is required to establish a preferred scheme.

=== Continuations ===
Like Blackwood, a follow-on bid may be used in Gerber to ask for kings. There are two principal approaches for the king-ask bid:

- Bid 5♣ to ask for kings or
- Use the next available bid, skipping the trump suit if one has been agreed, to ask for kings.

Step-responses mirror those for the ace-ask bid.

== Application ==
=== Comparison with Blackwood ===
The main perceived advantage of Gerber is that it is bid at a lower level and therefore allows for a final contract lower than does Blackwood (in the event that insufficient aces are present). This lower level also allows for an exploration of kings in more cases. A second advantage is that it is highly suitable for potential notrump contracts, whereas with Blackwood a final contract of 5NT may be confused with a bid asking for kings. For this reason, many use Gerber when the potential contract is in notrump.

=== Partnership agreement ===
Depending on the auction context, a bid of 4♣ may have several meanings; it might, for example, be confused with a splinter bid or a cue bid. For this reason, it is important that partnerships agree, in advance, when 4♣ is Gerber.

Possible partnership agreements for distinguishing 4♣ as Gerber from other meanings of 4♣ are:

- 4♣ is always Gerber.
- 4♣ is Gerber unless a natural club suit bid has been made by the partnership.
- 4♣ is Gerber if it is a jump bid or if a suit has been agreed as trump.
- 4♣ is Gerber if the immediate preceding bid by partner was in notrump.
- 4♣ is Gerber only if it is a jump bid over an opening bid or rebid of 1 NT or 2 NT. (Standard American Yellow Card)
- 4♣ is Gerber only when in response to opening bids of 1NT, 2NT or a strong artificial 2♣.

In addition, agreement is required on how to handle responder holding a void and on opposition interference in the bidding.
