= Honor point count =

System for hand evaluation in contract bridge

In contract bridge, the honor point count is a system for hand evaluation.

== Balanced hands ==
A balanced hand contains no voids or singletons, at most one doubleton and not more than five cards in any suit. Hand patterns fitting these criteria are 4-3-3-3, 4-4-3-2 and 5-3-3-2 and represent 47.6% of all possible deals. Hands with a 5-4-2-2 pattern are considered semi-balanced and if included in the criteria for balanced hands would raise the probability of being dealt one of the four hand patterns to 58.2%.

A common practice is to assign values to the four higher honors, called High Card Points (HCP) which are a rough estimate of the real value of those cards in a notrump contract:

- Ace = 4 HCP
- King = 3 HCP
- Queen = 2 HCP
- Jack = 1 HCP

This evaluation method was adapted from Auction Pitch by Bryant McCampbell and first published in 1915; after opposing it for 15 years, Milton Work accepted and published it in 1929. Today the 4-3-2-1 method is known worldwide as the "Work Point Count" or "Milton Work Point Count.

=== Four Aces ===
In the early thirties Howard Schenken, later author of the Schenken system, formed a successful team called the "Four Aces", together with Oswald Jacoby, Michael T. Gottlieb (later replaced by Richard Frey) and David Burnstine (who later changed his name to David Bruce). They devised an evaluation method of 3-2-1-0.5, totaling 26 HCP.

=== One over one ===
George Reith devised another count method about 1927, in which the 10 was assigned 1 point. To maintain proportionality the points assigned were 6-4-3-2-1, making a total of 64.

=== Vienna ===
The Vienna System was popular among Austrian players before World War II. In 1935 Dr. Paul Stern devised the Vienna system using the Bamberger scale, which ran 7-5-3-1 with no value assigned to the 10.

In fact, if we consider that a deck has 13 tricks, and that Aces and Kings win most of the tricks, the evaluation of 4 for an Ace is an undervaluation. Real Ace value is around 4.25, a King is around 3, a queen less than 2. But the simplicity of the 4-3-2-1 count is evident, and the solution to better evaluate is to rectify the total value of the hand after adding the MW points.

=== Adjustments to MW count ===
==== Honors adjustments ====
- Concentration of honors in a suit increases the value of the hand.
- Honors in the long suits increase the value of the hand. Conversely, honors in the short suits decrease the value of the hand.
- Intermediate honors increase the value of the hand, say KQJ98 is far more valuable than KQ432
- Unsupported honors count less as they have much less chance to win a trick or to promote tricks. The adjustment made is as follows:
  count 2 HCP instead of 3 for a singleton K
  count 1 HCP instead of 2 for a singleton Q
  count 0 HCP instead of 1 for a singleton J or even Jx
  decrease 1 point the value of unsupported doubleton honor combinations: AJ, KQ, KJ, QJ

==== Distributional adjustments ====
- deduct 1 HCP for a 4333 distribution
- add 1 HCP for having AAAA, i.e., first control in all suits.
- add 1 point for a good five-card suit (three honors)

== Unbalanced hands ==
The balanced HCP count loses weight as the distribution becomes more and more unbalanced. Unbalanced hands are divided in 3 groups: one-suited, two-suited and three-suited hands. Three-suited hands are evaluated counting HCP and distributional points, DP. The distributional points show the potential of the hand to take low-card tricks including long-suit tricks or short-suit tricks (ruffing tricks). Opener's DP count are less valuable as responders because usually trumping in the long side does not add tricks to the total number of tricks.

Distributional hand values

- doubleton 1 points
- Singleton 2 points
- Void 3 points

On the other hand, dummy contributes with additional tricks when declarer ruff with table's trumps. Therefore, the distributional values of dummy shortage, assuming there is good trump support, is:

- doubleton 1 point
- singleton 3 points
- void 5 points

Two-suited hands lacking a six-length suit (5422, 5431, 5521, 5530) are evaluated as above. More distributional hands, such as 6511, 6520, 6610, are better evaluated with the method used for the one-suited hands, that is, counting playing tricks. One-suited hands are evaluated according to the number of winners and/or the number of losers in the long suit (AKQ) and the number of winners/losers in the side suit.
