= Quantitative notrump bids =

Bidding term in contract bridge

In natural bidding systems most notrump (NT) bids are made with balanced hands and within a narrowly defined high card point (HCP) range. In these systems, such as Acol and Standard American, NT bids are limit bids and therefore are not forcing. Bearing in mind the need to bid only to the optimum contract and no higher, bids above game are made only in specific circumstances, one of which is to alert partner to the fact that a slam may be possible and inviting partner to take part in the decision-making process.

- Before looking at the detail, it is necessary to understand that bridge theory and practice suggest that the HCP method of hand evaluation, together with common sense concerning balance and cover in all suits, is the best for deciding the level of NT contracts, thus:
  - 25+ HCP is sufficient for a game 3NT
  - 33+ HCP should yield 12 tricks
  - 37+ HCP will probably produce a grand slam
- Assuming a weak NT bidding system, for example Acol, this is how quantitative bids work:
  - An opening bid of 1NT shows 12, 13 or 14 HCP.
    - If responder has 21 HCP, then a small slam looks certain (21 + 12 opener's minimum = 33) and should be bid.
    - If responder has 18 HCP or less, then even a small slam is not possible (18 + 14 opener's maximum = no more than 32)
    - If responder has 19 or 20 HCP, then a small slam is a possibility but more information is needed about opener's hand before it should be bid. This is where a quantitative bid should be made. A bid of 4NT "invites" opener to:
      - bid 6NT with a maximum holding of 14 HCP (19 + 14 = 33 which is sufficient)
      - pass with a minimum 12 HCP (20+ 12 = only 32)
      - with partnership agreement, bid 5NT holding 13 HCP - asking partner to bid 6NT with 20 HCP and to pass holding 19 HCP.
  - An opening bid of 2NT shows 20, 21 or 22 HCP.
    - If responder has 13 HCP, then a small slam looks certain (13 + 20 opener's minimum = 33) and should be bid
    - If responder has 11 or 12 HCP, then a small slam is a possibility but more information is needed about opener's hand before it should be bid. This is where a quantitative bid should be made. A bid of 4NT "invites" opener to:
      - bid 6NT with a maximum holding of 22 HCP (11 + 22 = 33 which is sufficient)
      - pass with a minimum 20 HCP (11+ 20 = only 31)
      - with partnership agreement, bid 5NT holding 21 HCP - asking partner to bid 6NT with 12 HCP and to pass holding 11 HCP.
  - When responder is even stronger and is considering whether a small or grand slam is better (and only these two options), then the initiating bid is 5NT (not 4NT)
- Similar bids can be made using a strong no trump bidding system, for example Standard American, by adjusting the HCP count accordingly
