= Slam-seeking conventions =

Codified artificial bids used in contract bridge

Slam-seeking conventions are codified artificial bids used in the card game contract bridge. Bidding and making a small slam (12 tricks) or grand slam (13 tricks) yields high bonuses ranging from 500 to 1500 points. However, the risk is also high as failure to fulfill the slam contract also means failure to score the bonus points for a game (300-500). Conventions have been devised to maximise the opportunity for success whilst minimising the risk of failure.

Contract bridge bidding systems are mainly "natural" (most bids have an obvious meaning) or "artificial" (many bids have a meaning unrelated to the denomination mentioned). However, even natural systems such as Acol find occasional need to resort to artificial means called conventions. A very common type of conventional bid is of the slam-seeking variety to be used in situations when a small slam or a grand slam appears possible but more information is needed before the optimum contract can be determined.

In order to make a small slam (grand slam) the combined strength and shape of the two hands must be sufficient to take 12 (13) tricks and the opponents must not be able to cash two (one) tricks before declarer has set up those 12 (13) tricks. It is widely considered (for example Klinger 1994 and Root 1998) that 33 high-card points are needed for making a small slam in no trumps, and 37 high card points for a NT grand slam. However, slams in a suit can be made with fewer high-card points if the two hands fit well, for example have no "wasted values", have a double fit (8+ cards in both trump suit and a side suit), have "primary values" (aces and kings) rather than "secondary" ones (jacks and queens), or are shapely (with long suits and voids or singletons). Slam seeking conventions have been devised to establish whether these conditions exist.

There are pros and cons with each convention and none are suitable in all circumstances; some are better used when a notrump contract is likely and others when a trump contract is sought. Certain groups of slam seeking conventions can be used in combination whilst others are mutually exclusive. The choice of conventions and their application to particular hands is a basic part of bridge skill.

== Blackwood ==
In its original form, Blackwood is an artificial four notrump bid (4NT) which asks partner to disclose the number of aces in his hand. With no aces or four, partner replies 5♣; with one, two, or three aces, 5♦, 5♥, or 5♠, respectively.

In a more modern form, known as Roman Key Card Blackwood (RKCB), the 4NT bid asks partner to disclose the number of key cards held where the five key cards are the four aces and the king of trumps. Responses are stepwise: 5♣ for 0 or 3 key cards, 5♦ for 1 or 4, 5♥ for 2 without the trump queen, 5♠ for 2 with the trump queen. Some prefer to reverse the meaning of the first two responses and the variants are referred to in abbreviation as RKCB 3014 and RKCB 1430 respectively. Various methods are used to continue with king-asking and queen-asking bids.

Both Blackwood and RKCB work well when spades are trump, but run the risk of bidding too high when a lower suit, such as clubs, is trump. There exist similar conventions that try to work around this shortcoming. One of the most popular of these is Kickback, in which the asking bid is 4 of the next strain above the trump suit, rather than always being 4NT, with the step responses identical to RKCB (e.g., 3 steps up shows 2 or 5 key cards without the queen). This conserves bidding space and lets the partnership sign off in 5 of the trump suit regardless of what suit is trump and regardless of how many key cards have been shown.

== Gerber ==
This is similar to Blackwood but the ace-asking bid is 4♣ rather than 4NT. The responses are 4♦ for 0 or 4, 4♥ for 1, 4♠ for 2, and 4NT for 3. Similarly, a 5♣ bid following an ace-ask asks for kings. Gerber is a jump bid to 4♣ used after a notrump opening bid and on other occasions by partnership agreement.

== Culbertson 4–5 NT ==
Culbertson 4–5 NT was the first slam bidding system to gain widespread approval; it was part of the Culbertson system through the 1930s, and was part of the British Acol system for many years. After suit agreement, the bid of 4NT showed two aces and the king of a (genuine) bid suit, or three aces. Responder would make one of these bids: five of the lowest bid genuine suit to deny an ace; bid a suit (if necessary at the six level) to show the ace of that suit. Bid 5NT to show two aces. There are various subtleties, and both partners are allowed some latitude for judgement. The convention is rarely used today.

== Quantitative notrump bids ==
These are used to establish whether two relatively balanced hands have sufficient high card points (HCP) to make a slam or grand slam contract in notrump; used after a notrump opening bid.

== Cue bid ==
Cue bids are a co-operative system. Cue bids are used to communicate specific controls (aces or voids, kings and singletons). Once a trump suit has been agreed and the two hands are considered to be strong enough, partners bid the lowest available suit which they control; this process continues until one of the partners has sufficient information to make the contract decision. Cue bids have been part of the Acol system from the early days.

== Grand slam force ==
The grand slam force uses a direct bid of 5NT to query the quality of partner's trump suit. It cannot be used following Blackwood because the bid of 5NT asks for kings, but it can be used following cue bids or Gerber.

== Splinter bid ==
Splinter bids are a variety of cue bids. Splinters are used early in the bidding to communicate a strong hand, with a fit for partner's last bid suit and a side-suit singleton or void. The splinter bid is a double jump shift to the singleton or void suit. Partner of the splinter bidder will then typically bid game or proceed with cue-bids to investigate the possibility of a slam.

== Swiss convention ==
In the Swiss convention, in response to an opening 1♥ or 1♠, a bid of 4♣ or 4♦ shows four-card support for partner's suit, about 13–15 points, and two or three aces respectively. Alternatively, the bids of 4♣ and 4♦ can be used to show trump quality; the specific meaning of the two bids varies between partnerships.

== Asking bid ==
Given a hand which justifies slam exploration, an Asking bid pin-points a potential weakness. As in Blackwood, one partner takes control and asks the other for his holding, but as in cuebids, it is related to a specific suit. The partner replies stepwise to communicate features of the queried suit. Asking bids were devised by Alan Moorehead and developed by Ely Culbertson and are an alternative to cuebids. They are still used in some artificial systems, such as Precision Club.

== Serious 3NT ==
A "Serious 3NT" is used by one partner during a cue bidding sequence to indicate a strong slam try. A cue bid that bypasses 3NT indicates a control while denying a strong hand (in case partner is strong).

== Last Train ==
A bid just below game level, in an agreed suit, suggests the possibility of a slam.

== Relay bid ==
Relays form a highly artificial codified scheme, where one partner takes full control early in the auction and just bids the cheapest available bids (relays), and the other describes distribution and controls in detail. The scheme based on relays, where one partner describes an absence of controls (rather than presence, as in cue bids), is known as Spiral scan, and can be combined with Blackwood, even in natural systems.

== See also ==
- Norman four notrump
- San Francisco convention
