= Bidding system =

Bridge system

A bidding system in contract bridge is the set of agreements and understandings assigned to calls and sequences of calls used by a partnership, and includes a full description of the meaning of each treatment and convention. The purpose of bidding is for each partnership to ascertain which contract, whether made or defeated and whether bid by them or by their opponents, would give the partnership their best scoring result.

Each bidding system ascribes a meaning to every possible call by each member of a partnership, and presents a codified language which allows the players to exchange information about their card holdings. The vocabulary of bidding is limited to 38 different calls - 35 level/denomination bids plus pass, double and redouble. Any bid becomes a contract if followed by three successive passes, therefore every bridge bid is a potential contract.

By the rules of the game, the agreed meanings of all calls must be public and known to the opponents. In normal club or home play, the opponents are entitled, at their turn to make a call, to ask the partner of the bidder about the meaning of the call. In high-level tournaments, where screens are used, the procedure is to ask the screen-mate about their calls as well as their partner's calls. In serious online tournaments, the procedure is for the player making the call to self-alert it, but the explanation is visible only to the opponents.

== Classification ==
Bidding systems can be classified into two broad categories: natural systems and artificial systems. In natural systems, most bids (especially in the early phase of the bidding) denote length in the suit bid. In artificial systems, the bids are more highly codified, so that for example a bid of 1♣ may not be related to a holding in the club suit.

Natural system(s) are the "lingua franca" of bridge players, with regional variations. Thus, a new partnership can agree to play a natural system and understand each other fairly well. Players sometimes alter certain aspects of a system, adding their specific agreements or preferred conventions.

Structure and meaning of opening bids are the common determining factor for system classification: in most modern natural systems, opening bids of 1♣ through 2♣ have the same or similar meaning, with level-one bids denoting length in a suit. Artificial systems typically reserve at least one one-level suit opening bid for special purposes, unrelated to the suit.

=== Natural systems ===
Natural systems generally use opening bids as follows:

- A bid of 1♥ or 1♠ shows at least 4 or 5 cards in the major suit, and 1♣ or 1♦ shows at least 3 or 4 cards in the minor suit. The complete hand usually contains about (11)12-20(22) high card points. As between two major suits or between two minor suits, the bidder opens in the longer suit; with equal lengths, the higher ranking suit is usually chosen. If the opening bid of 1♥ or 1♠ promises 5 cards, the system is referred to as a "five-card major" system; otherwise, it is referred to as a "four-card major" system. The term five-card majors implies that an opening bid in a minor suit bid might show three card length only (for example, the hand pattern might be 4=4=2=3, so neither major suit is long enough to show with an opening bid).
- A bid of 1NT shows a balanced hand in a narrow high card points (HCP) range. The common ranges are 15-17 or 16-18 HCP ("strong notrump") and 12-14 ("weak notrump").
- A bid of 2♣ typically shows a very strong hand (22+ points).
- A bid of 2NT shows a strong balanced hand, usually 20-21 HCP.
- Opening bids of 3 of any suit are preemptive, showing a 7+ card suit and 6-10 points (mostly inside the bid suit).
- The meaning of 2♦, 2♥ and 2♠ varies. One common usage is that the bid shows a weak two bid, similar to a preemptive bid. Another is the strong two bid, which is natural and shows a very strong hand (too strong for a 1-level opening). Yet another usage, popular in otherwise natural systems, is to use weak two bids in the major suits, and 2♦ as Flannery: four spades and five hearts in a hand of minimum strength.

==== Specific systems ====
The most widespread natural systems are:

- Acol, featuring 4-card majors and weak notrump, originating in Great Britain
- Standard American, originally with 4-card majors but later adopting 5-card majors. Strong notrump.
- Bridge Base Basic, based on Standard American and used in internet play
- 2/1 game forcing, based on Standard American and gradually superseding it. Some features of 2/1 game forcing originated from the Roth–Stone and Kaplan–Sheinwold systems of the 1950s and 1960s.

Various developments in the area of natural systems have resulted in systems that are natural in essence, but contain special features. Examples are systems like Romex, Boring Club, Fantunes, and EHAA (Every Hand An Adventure).

=== Artificial systems ===
Artificial systems can be further classified into:

- Strong club systems are the most popular artificial systems, where opening of 1♣ shows a strong hand (typically 16+ HCP). Other 1-level bids are typically natural, but limited to about 15 HCP. The most popular strong club systems are:
  - Vanderbilt Club (the predecessor)
  - Precision Club
  - Blue Club
- In Small club systems, the opening bid of 1♣ is forcing but not necessarily strong. It typically includes some range of balanced hands, some hands with long club suit, and very strong hands. Examples are:
  - Vienna System (the predecessor)
  - Roman Club, developed and used by famous Blue Team
  - Polish Club, originating (and standard) in Poland but also gained certain popularity worldwide.
  - Dutch doubleton, an offspring of the Polish Club system
  - SAYC+, Based on Standard American but with the 1♣ forcing and including all 21+ hands too. Forcing Club
- Strong diamond systems are similar to strong club systems, but the bid of 1♦ shows a strong opening, typically 16+ and the bid of 1♣ is typically nebulous. This gives more room over the nebulous 1♣ opening compared to the strong club's nebulous 1♦ opening. There are several examples listed here www.strongdiamond.co.uk.
- Strong pass systems are based on the idea that 8-12 HCP hands are the most frequent (about 45% chance to hold such a hand). Most of the initial opening bids describe this range, while strong (13+ HCP) hands (28% of the hands) start with PASS, the lowest available call. Weak (0-7 HCP) hands are opened with one other bid, often 1♦. Of course partner in 3rd or 4th place will never pass a strong PASS "opening", thus 3rd and 4th place "openings" are different. Strong pass systems were popular in Poland in the 1960s and 1970s, before the restrictions. These systems are often relay-based, but it is not a necessity, their main advantage is that they initiate with the most frequent intermediate hands and rob some bidding space with the weak ones.
  Strong pass systems are mostly banned by World Bridge Federation and other governing organizations from all competitions except the highest-level ones, because opponents cannot be reasonably expected to cope with such an unusual approach. See: Highly unusual method
- Relay systems are based on relay bids – the artificial bids where one partner just bids the cheapest denomination (relay bid) and the other describes his distribution and high cards in detail (relay response) using a highly codified scheme. Such systems are out of the above classification (based on opening bid structure), as the relay feature takes place later in the auction. For example, relatively popular "Moscito system" has variants based on strong-club and strong-pass approaches. Symmetric relay is based on Precision club. Relay systems do not need to begin with an initial forcing pass or an initial forcing 1♣ opening. The ACBL typically disallows relay systems, on the grounds that they are too difficult to defend against without a lot of advance preparation.

== See also ==
- Bridge conventions
- List of bidding systems
- Standard American
- Acol
