= Catherine A. Streeter =

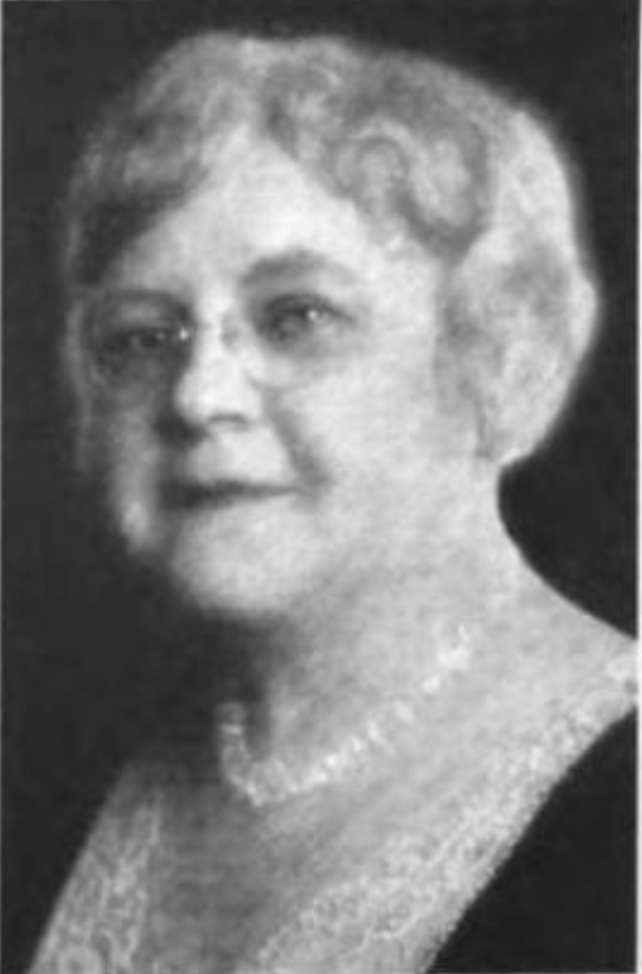
- Streeter in 1929
- Born: Catherine A. Armstrong; July 14, 1874; Terre Haute, Indiana, U.S.
- Died: May 8, 1950 (aged 75); Muncie, Indiana, U.S.
- Resting place: Crown Hill Cemetery
- Occupation: Businesswoman
- Known for: Gaming expert
- Spouse: Harry Winton Streeter (m. 1896; died 1903)
- Children: 3

Catherine A. Streeter (née, Armstrong; 1873–1950) was an American businesswoman and gaming expert. She entered the insurance field in Terre Haute, Indiana after her husband's death and proved to be a very capable business executive. Later in life, in Los Angeles, California, she was a recognized expert, lecturer and coach in auction bridge, contract bridge, and mahjong.

== Early life and education ==
Catherine Armstrong was born at Terre Haute, Indiana, July 14, 1874. The family held a substantial business and social position. Her father was William H. Armstrong, who was born in England and was three years of age when his parents came to the U.S. He had a common school education and as a boy, he enlisted as a soldier in the Union Army, rising to the rank of lieutenant. After his military service, he located at Terre Haute, where he engaged in the pharmacy business. He became prominent in city affairs, served as mayor, and for 30 years was president of the board of trustees of the State Normal School. He was also one of the prominent members of the Grand Army of the Republic and the Loyal Legion, and he organized the Sons of Veterans in Indiana. In 1890, William H. Armstrong removed to Indianapolis, where he engaged in the manufacture of surgical instruments, a business that was carried on by members of the family. He died at Indianapolis in October 1914. Catherine's mother, May (née Eldred), was born at Joliet, Illinois, and finished her education in St. Xavier Convent in Chicago. Catherine had five siblings, three brothers and two sisters, May, Richard, Helen, William, and Eldred.

She attended the common and high schools of her native city before moving to Indianapolis and attending St. Mary's Episcopal School, and graduating from Knickerbocker Hall (1891), a girls school.

== Career ==
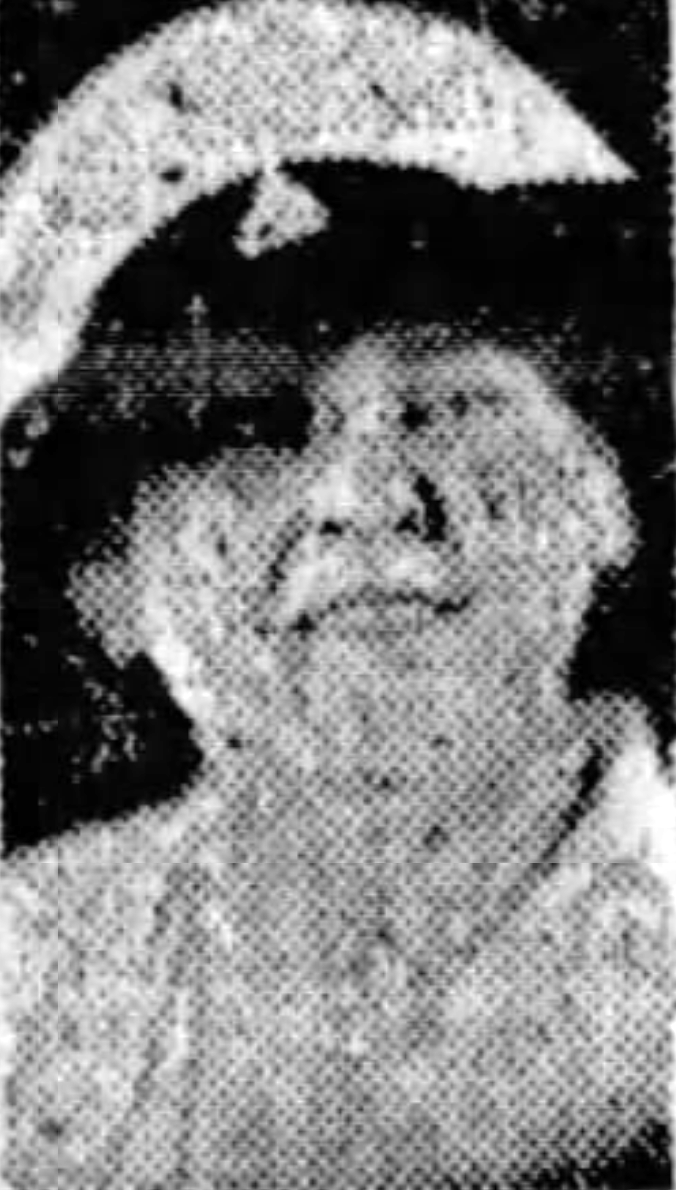
Streeter in 1926

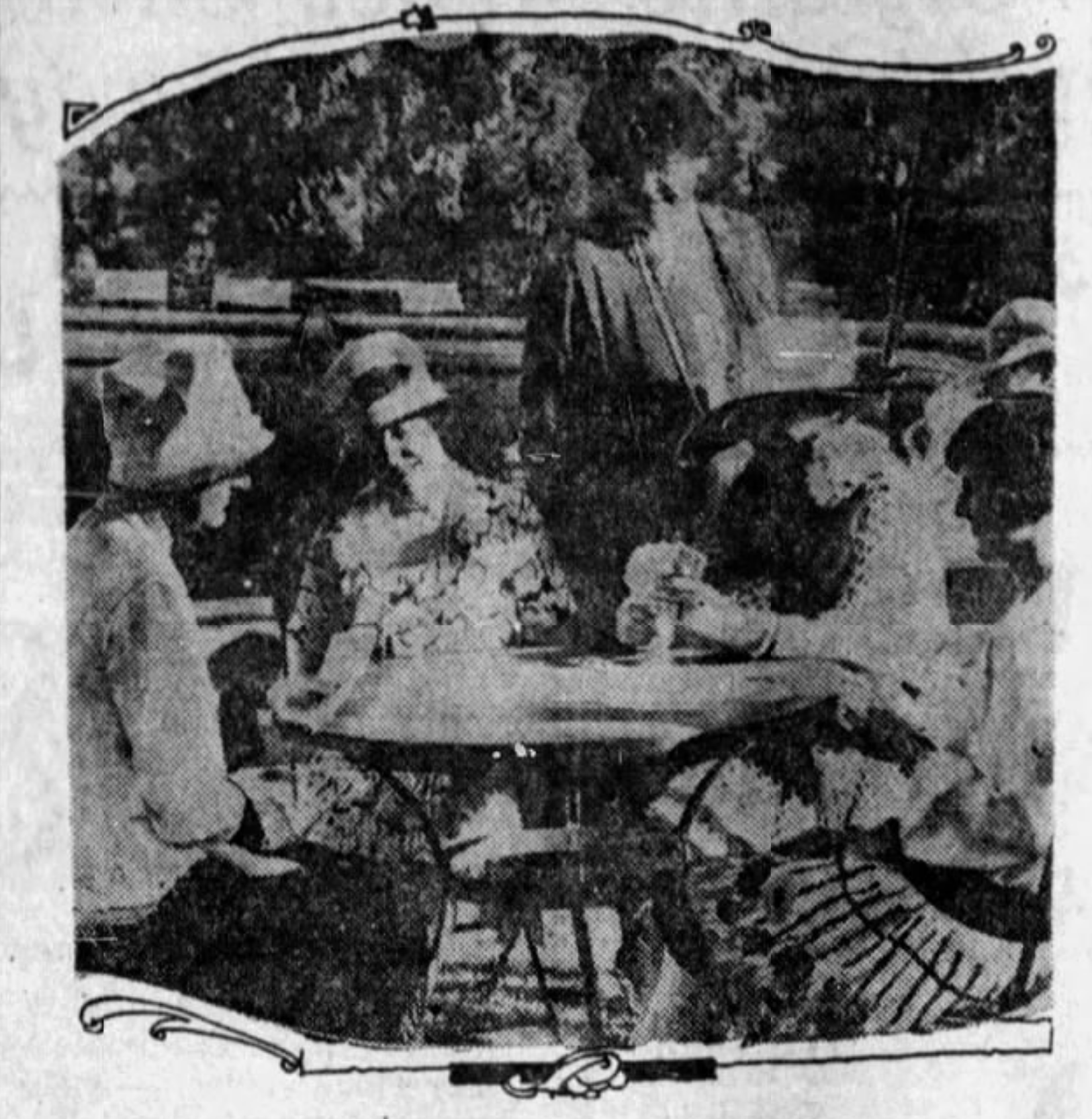
Streeter in 1927 (standing)

Widowed in 1903, Streeter determined to make herself independent in order to provide for her children. Though she had no special business training, had never seen an insurance policy, and had no experience or knowledge of the insurance business, Streeter returned to Terre Haute and started in that business. She applied herself to mastering its principles, and despite early discouragements she was soon turning in a large monthly report of business,. Once started, that business grew and accumulated until she was at the head of one of the best agencies in Terre Haute and represented some of the largest and best known companies. As the owner of the Catherine A. Streeter Insurance Agency, she also gave talks on women in business.

Moving to Los Angeles around 1919, Streeter became an authority on auction bridge, contract bridge. and mahjong. She lectured on these topics at the Ambassador Hotel, El Royale Bridge Club, Hotel Maryland, and the Windsor Apartment Hotel. In 1927, she took up residence in one of the villas at Garden of Allah Hotel, where she continued to teach bridge, and hold bridge sessions on Mondays. Streeter worked as a club coach, took up supporting bid rules, and held classes in the tea room of Bullock's. She also wrote a bridge column in the Los Angeles Sunday Times.

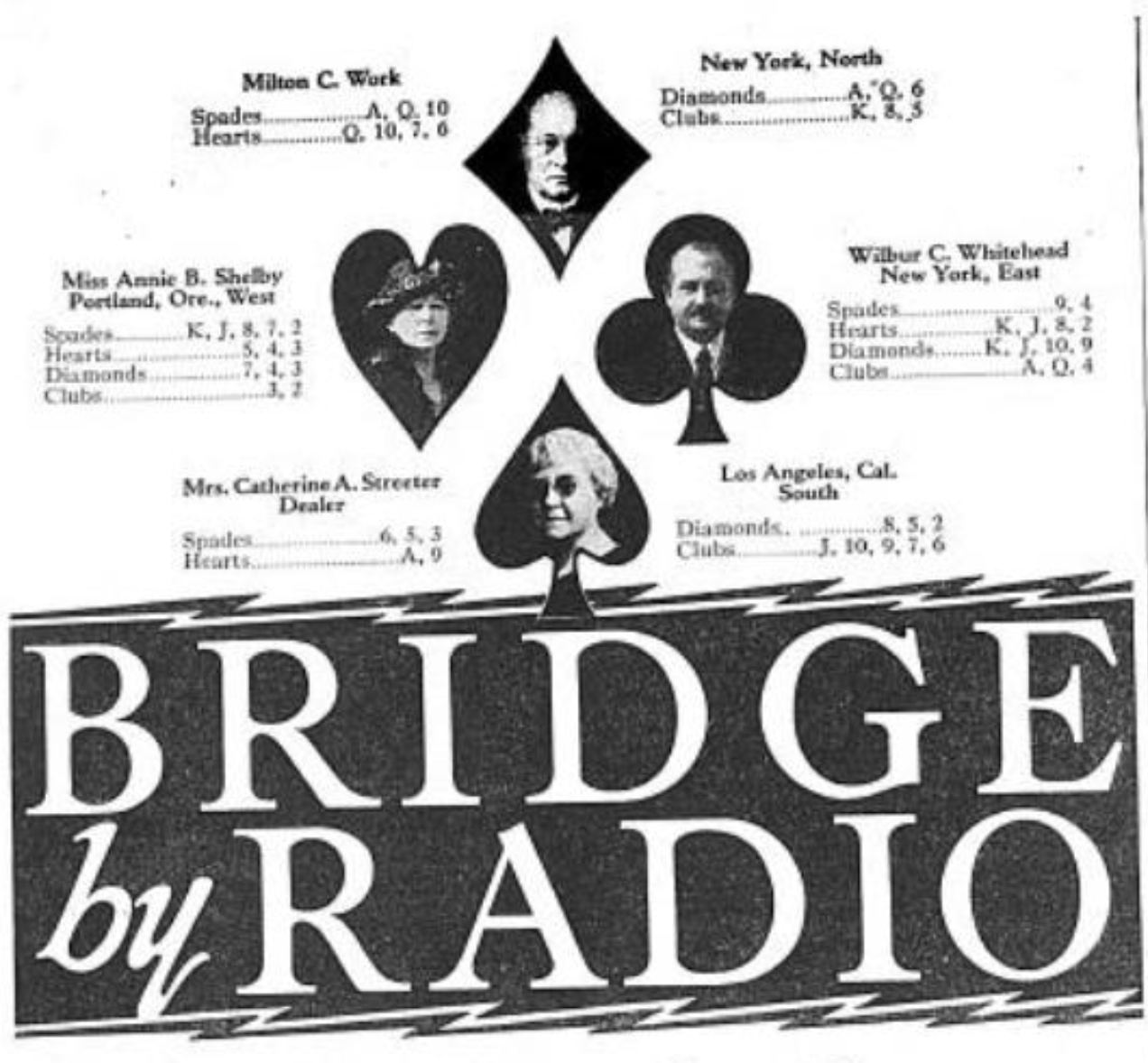
Milton C. Work, Wilbur C. Whitehead, Catherine A. Streeter, Annie B. Shelby (clockwise) (Bridge by Radio, 1927)

With Emma Holt Given, Streeter founded the Rossmore Bridge club and Studios in the Hancock Park neighborhood of Los Angeles; Given served as Streeter's assistant. Branding themselves as recognized bridge authorities, they gave private and class instruction, as well as holding bridge lunches, teas, and dinners. Streeter was also associated with Milton Work and Wilbur C. Whitehead in the national broadcasting of radio bridge.

== Personal life ==
On September 16, 1896, when she was 22 years of age, she married Harry Winton Streeter, of Muncie, Indiana. He was connected with the business of glass manufacture at Muncie. The couple had three children (Winton, William, and Virginia) before Mr. Streeter's death in 1903.

Catherine Armstrong Streeter died in Muncie on May 8, 1950, and was buried at that city's Crown Hill Cemetery.
