= Cavendish Club =

Prestigious contract bridge club

The Cavendish Club was a prestigious contract bridge club founded in 1925 by Wilbur Whitehead in association with Gratz M. Scott and Edwin A. Wetzlar. Initially located at the Mayfair House (65th and Park Avenue) in New York City, it relocated several times with a final address in a townhouse on 73rd. St. It ceased operations at the end of May 1991 as a result of rent escalations and falling membership.

The Cavendish had reciprocal arrangements with Crockford's in London, the Golfer's in Paris and the Savoy in Hollywood, California.

In 1975, the Club inaugurated the Cavendish Invitational Pairs, now one of the strongest and most prestigious invitational contract bridge events in the world.

== Notable members ==
The membership was held to 400 and included many notable bridge players - Mitchell Barnes, John Crawford, Harry Fishbein, Sam Fry, Charles Goren, Oswald Jacoby, Edgar Kaplan, Albert Morehead, Harold Ogust, Howard Schenken, Freddy Sheinwold, Helen Sobel, Samuel Stayman, Tobias Stone, Harold Vanderbilt and Waldemar von Zedtwitz

== Management ==
From 1941, the Cavendish Club was a not-for-profit membership corporation, managed by B. Jay Becker 1941-1947 and Rudolf Muhsam 1947-1973 (also club secretary), Thomas M. Smith 1973-1987, Thomas L. Snow, 1987-1990 and Richard Reisig, 1990-1991.

Presidents were: Gratz M. Scott, 1925-1935; Frank Crowninshield, 1935-1947 Nate Spingold 1948-1958 Samuel Stayman, 1958-1961 and 1981-1982 Howard Schenken, 1961-1964 Harold Ogust, 1964-1967 Leonard Hess, 1967-1970; Edward Loewenthal, 1970-1973 Roy V. Titus, 1973-1976 and 1980-1981 Archie A. Brauer, 1976-1979 Yehuda Koppel, 1979-1980 and 1985–86 William Roberts, 1982-1985 Sidney Rosen, 1986-1987 Claire Tornay, 1987-1990, and Thomas M. Smith, 1990-1991.
