= Henry Beasley =

British army officer and bridge player

Lieutenant Colonel James Henry Mountiford Beasley DSO (28 March 1876 – 14 December 1949), known as Pops, was a British Army officer and a leading contract bridge personality in the early days of the game.

== Life ==
Beasley was born in 1876 in Jhansi in Uttar Pradesh, India, where his father was a minister. He was educated at Bedford School, and entered the Royal Military Academy (Woolwich) on leaving school. Beasley was gazetted to the Royal Artillery in 1896. He served in India, Burma and China, and took part in the Relief of Peking after the Boxer Rebellion. He served in the First World War on the staff of the Anzac Corps. He was thrice mentioned in despatches and awarded the Distinguished Service Order (DSO). After the war he served in Germany on the Disarmament Commission. He was an interpreter in French, German and Hindustani.

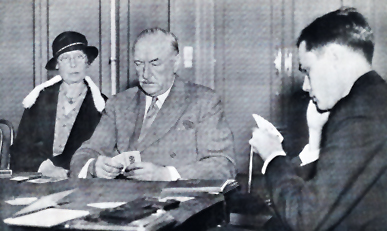
Beasley during a practice match at Grosvenor House, before the 1933 Schwab Cup match vs Culbertson. Right is probably Terence Reese.

Pops had played all forms of bridge from the days of bridge–whist and auction bridge. He wrote his first book on this game in 1906, London Bridge, which "started the bridge craze in all the fashionable clubs of that day" [Beasley]. Like many of the early contract bridge players, he had been an expert auction bridge player in the 1920s. In domestic bridge he was a leading organiser. He had been a member of Almacks club since 1901, and later was a co-founder and Chairman of two leading London card clubs – Crockford's (in St James's Street) and the Hamilton Club (in Hamilton Place). He was also a leading player in the 1930s, winning the Gold Cup in 1933, and playing in several international events. He was an author and bridge columnist, and the originator of a bidding system named after him.

"Pops was a brilliant player and a great psychologist. In his time he won most of the major tournaments and he captained England on numerous occasions". –Ewart Kempson

In bidding, Beasley adopted many of Culbertson's ideas, but was displeased with the strong twos and their negative response of two no trumps. As a result, so he claimed, he was the inventor (in 1936) of the artificial strong two clubs opening bid with its negative response two diamonds. For many years all the British bidding systems used this method of dealing with strong hands: Acol (both standard and Benjaminised), CAB, Two Clubs and Baron systems all used it. However, it is fair to mention that others have also claimed authorship of this fruitful idea.

== Matches vs Culbertson ==
Beasley's bridge team played two matches against the formidable Culbertson team, losing both, but helping to develop the game in Britain.

The first match, Crockford's v. Culbertson, took place in 1930, after the Buller–Culbertson match. The Crockford's team was Beasley, Sir Guy Domville (popular society and sporting figure), George Morris and Captain Hogg. Culbertson won the match over 200 deals by 4,905 points (total points scoring).

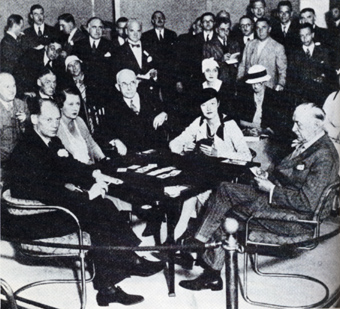
At table, from left: Ely Culbertson, Lady Doris Rhodes, referee Col GGJ Walshe, Josephine Culbertson, Pops Beasley. Behind, far left: Hubert Phillips.

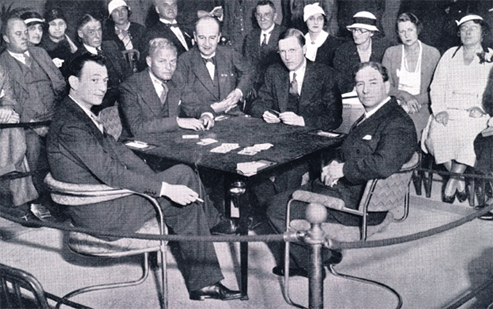
At table, from left: Michael T. Gottlieb, George Morris, referee Mr Mundy, Theodore Lightner, Percy Tabbush. Behind left, Hubert Phillips; second right, Doris Rhodes.

The second match, for the Schwab trophy in 1933, was a more significant event, preceded by the usual brilliant Culbertson publicity. Played at Selfridges, it was widely reported in the press and on newsreel, and was attended by many spectators. A large periscope was used so that spectators outside the playing-room could glimpse the players. Play could also be followed on a massive electrical scoreboard ("the forerunner to Bridgerama") in the Palm Court area. The most common partnerships were: Britain: Beasley & Sir Guy Domville; George Morris & Percy Tabbush; Lady Doris Rhodes & Graham Mathieson. America: Ely & Josephine Culbertson; Theodore Lightner & Michael Gottlieb. Both teams sometimes paired the players differently.

George Morris and Percy Tabbush were an interesting pair: according to Reese, Morris was "a famous gambler at every card game, and an athlete; he had made a Channel-swimming attempt and played marathon golf for big stakes. His health failed and he was a pitiable sight in later years. Tabbush followed a course that is not common amongst bridge players: he joined a religious sect and turned his back on the 'Devil's playthings'."

Mathieson's part in the match was curtailed when he fell through a glass roof, to be rescued swinging from a girder above a 40-foot drop! The Culbertson team won by the decisive, but not overwhelming, margin of 10,900 points (total points scoring). Hubert Phillips, writing in the News Chronicle, put the reasons as superior teamwork, avoidance of unnecessary risks when vulnerable, and greater precision in slam-bidding. The match was analysed in three books, and had a considerable effect on bidding methods in Britain and elsewhere.

Beasley died after suffering a stroke in 1949.
