= Game of the Century =

Game of the Century may refer to:

== Sports ==
- Game of the Century (chess), a chess game between Donald Byrne and Bobby Fischer in 1956
- Game of the Century (college basketball), a basketball game between the Houston Cougars and UCLA Bruins in 1968
- Game of the Century (college football), any one of several games in U.S. college football
- Italy v West Germany (1970 FIFA World Cup), the semi-final of the 1970 FIFA World Cup between Italy and West Germany
- Match of the Century (rugby union), a 1905 match between Wales and New Zealand
- The Game of the Century (Go), a game of Go between Honinbo Shusai and Go Seigen in 1934

== Television ==
- The Game of the Century (TV series), 1978 British TV series

== See also ==
- Bridge Battle of the Century
- Empire: Wargame of the Century
- Match of the Century (disambiguation)
- Game of the Year (disambiguation)
- The Greatest Game Ever Played (disambiguation)
