= Bridge Battle of the Century =

1931–1932 contract bridge challenge match

The "Bridge Battle of the Century" was the name given to a celebrated 1931–1932 contract bridge challenge match between Ely Culbertson and Sidney Lenz and their partners.

The match pitted Culberson's bidding system, which had been laid out in his widely selling Contract Bridge Blue Book of 1930 and was sweeping the bridge world, against the Official System which had been developed by a group calling itself the Bridge Headquarters, of which Lenz was a member along with Milton Work, Wilbur Whitehead, Edward Valentine Shepard, George Reith, and others.

The two camps, Culbertson and the Bridge Headquarters, engaged in a war of words regarding which system was superior (Culbertson, on arriving from Europe on the Mauretania, was quoted as describing the Official System as "Eighty percent Culbertson, twelve percent Work and Lenz, and eight percent rubbish") and Culbertson offered a challenge to Lenz's group, which was accepted. The format was to be pair-against-pair. Culbertson laid down a bet of $5,000 and Lenz $1,000 (but the winnings to go to charity in any case).

The match was played in a glare of publicity such as never has attended any other bridge game nor ever will again. The day-by-day scores were front-page news in 30 countries and every move was reported on the radio.

— Terence Reese and David Bird, Famous Hands from Famous Matches

The match attracted a mass audience, being front-page news across the world and widely reported on the radio; the term "Bridge Battle of the Century" was used in contemporary reporting. NBC aired a fifteen-minute radio broadcast on the match each night.

The first part of the match was played at the Chatham Hotel, in the Culbertson's apartment. The second part was played in the newly opened Waldorf-Astoria. Chief referee was Alfred Gruenther, a lieutenant instructor at West Point and bridge expert (and later Supreme Allied Commander Europe). Ely Culbertson's primary partner was his wife Josephine Culbertson (nowadays considered by some to have been a stronger player than her husband); she played 88 of the 150 rubbers. Ely Culbertson's other partners were Theodore Lightner, Waldemar von Zedtwitz, Howard Schenken, and Michael Gottlieb. Lenz chose as his partner emerging great Oswald Jacoby, but Jacoby quit about two-thirds of the way through the match, being dissatisfied with Lenz's play. Winfield Liggett was Lenz's partner for the remainder of the match. According to Gruenther, what chiefly upset Jacoby was that Lenz often criticised his play when (in his opinion) it was Lenz who had made the mistake. An example occurred in the 97th rubber, when after one hand Lenz criticised Jacoby's defence. Jacoby retorted that he had made a play that "only twelve experts in the country would understand, and unfortunately Mr Lenz did not appear, at that particular moment, to be one of them".

The match was for 150 rubbers and ran from December 1931 into January 1932. Lenz and Jacoby led through 43 rubbers, but then fell behind. Jacoby quit after the 103rd rubber. Culbertson built up a lead that grew to 20,535; Lenz made up some of that gap but still finished 8,980 behind.
