= Edward Shepard =

Edward Shepard may refer to:

- Edward M. Shepard (1850–1911), American politician
- Edward V. Shepard (1866–1937), American authority on the game of bridge

== See also ==
- Edward Sheppard (1891–1962), English cricketeer
- Edward Shepherd (died 1747), English architect
- Edwin M. Shepard (1843–1904), American admiral
