= Bridge Headquarters =

Contract bridge expert group

Bridge Headquarters was a group of contract bridge experts organized in the early 1930s.

The group was organized in July 1931. The Bridge Headquarters was organized as a formal corporation under that name. Representing bridge's "old guard", it stood in opposition to Ely Culbertson's bidding system, and with a stated purpose of standardizing bridge bidding and play. To that end, the twelve members created a system it called the Official System.

Culbertson engaged in a war of words against the Bridge Headquarters, culminating in a 1931-1932 challenge match, the so-called "Bridge Battle of the Century", Culbertson and partners against Bridge Headquarters member Sidney Lenz and partners. Lenz lost, and the Official System was eventually superseded by other systems. However, Milton Work's point-count system, an important component of the Official System (and which stood in contrast to Culbertson's more cumbersome honor-count system), constituted the basis of Charles Goren's system which became by far the most popular system for the second half of the 20th century.

== Members ==
- Sidney Lenz
- Milton Work
- Wilbur Whitehead
- Edward Valentine Shepard
- George Reith
- and seven others.
- The "seven others" included, but were not limited to the following dozen. Culbertson seems to have invented the fiction about the "twelve" members of the Bridge Headquarters. Presumably, he could then point out that the board of his group, The Bridge World (composed of mostly paid Culbertson employees and a handful of personal buddies) had more members than the entire "twelve" members of the Bridge Headquarters. Possibly, only a dozen signed the incorporation papers -- a wild guess on my part. The Official Book on the Official System contains close-up, individual, face photographs and short bios each of these 17 "Sponsors" and "Advisory Council" members. Two slightly different editions, American and British) of this 236-page book were printed in 1931.
- Charles True Adams
- Shepard Barclay
- F. Dudley Courtenay
- Fred G. French (Captain, USA, Retired)
- Henry P. Jaeger
- Madeleine Kerwin
- Winfield Liggett (Commander US Navy Retired)
- Mrs. Guy U. Purdy
- Ralph Reed Richards
- Victor R. Smith
- Edward C. Wolf
- Walter F. Wyman
