= Paul Stern =

Austrian bridge player and lawyer (1892–1948)

- Born: 4 April 1892; Austria-Hungary
- Died: 12 June 1948 (aged 56); Hampstead, London, England
- Occupations: Bridge player, lawyer
- Known for: Founder of the Austrian Bridge Federation

Paul Stern (4 April 1892 – 12 June 1948) was an Austrian international bridge player and lawyer, who fled to London in 1938. He was a bidding theorist and administrator who contributed to the early growth of the game. He founded the Austrian Bridge Federation in 1929, and was its first president.

According to his obituary in the Contract Bridge Journal:

Paul Stern - whose "Dr." was a so inseparable part of his name that he signed the most casual post-card with the prefix - was, both in his early life and in his exile, an unforgettable figure. He was tall, burly, irascible, with a voice so rough, a temperament so volatile that half the people who saw him called him a dictator; but with a charm so great, a sweetness so unexpected that even those he castigated seldom bore malice for long.

== Career in bridge ==
Stern was a member of the Austria open teams who won the first two European championships, 1932 and 1933, under the auspices of the International Bridge League in Scheveningen, Netherlands, and in London. In 1935 he developed the Vienna System, or Austrian System, the first highly artificial bidding system to achieve international success. Strong hands (equivalent to about 18 or more high-card points using the now-standard Milton Work count) were opened One Notrump; most hands with 11–17 points that lacked a five card spade, heart or diamond suit were opened One Club. Many strong players adopted the Vienna System and Stern remained the leader and an important mentor. He was the non-playing captain when Austria recaptured the European championships (Open category) in 1936 and 1937.

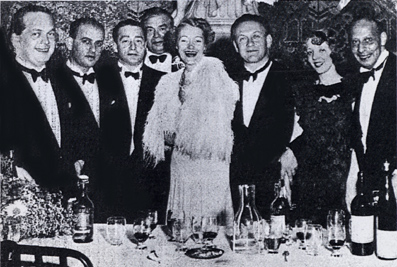
The winning Austria open team at the 1937 world championships: Karl Schneider, Hans Jellinek, Edouard Frischauer, Paul Stern (captain), Josephine Culbertson (US), Walter Herbert, Helen Sobel (US), and Karl von Blöhdorn. Missing: Udo von Meissl.

The 1937 IBL Championships doubled as the first world championship tournament, conducted June 1937 in Budapest. In the final, Austria defeated Ely Culbertson's team from the United States by 4,740 points over 96 boards, using the Vienna System against the natural Culbertson system. The result of this match caused a sensation, as did all the previous Culbertson matches. Stern's book on the championships does not mention that there were other teams in the event! The world champions were anchored by Karl Schneider and Hans Jellinek, perhaps the world's strongest pair at the time, with Karl von Blöhdorn, Dr Edward Frischauer, Walter Herbert and Udo von Meissl. (Bridge teams, or teams-of-four, commonly have six players with two on the "bench" at any time.) Culbertson traveled with four players, as usual —Ely and Josephine at one table, Helen Sobel and Charles Vogelhofer at the other— and it was widely thought at the time that this quartet was not America's best. In addition, the Culbertsons were on the verge of divorce, which cannot be good for a bridge partnership.

Austria also won the Ladies flight of the exceptional European/World championships, and thus won the first three annual Europeans for women. Decades later, Stern's protégé (Erika) Rixi Scharfstein, a member of those 1935 to 1937 champions, would win many European and world titles as Rixi Markus representing Great Britain.

According to a September 1948 article on Markus in the Contract Bridge Journal, Stern was "perhaps the greatest coach who ever lived". A dictatorial leader, Stern insisted that his players adhered with rigidity to his system, but his over-emphatic statements and instructions were tempered by an underlying warmth of personality. According to Rixi Markus's autobiography, A Vulnerable Game, Stern would hit her on the hand if she made a mistake. When training the Austrian ladies' team, if unhappy with their play he would yell "Cows!".

When Germany annexed Austria in 1938 (Anschluss), he returned his military medals, awarded in World War I and which included the Golden Merit Cross with Crown awarded for the highest level of bravery in the face of the enemy, to the Nazi authorities and included an insulting letter. As a result, he was put on a death list. He escaped to England; his wife, Martha, and two teenage children joined him shortly afterwards. He was a major bridge figure in London for the next decade, founding a school of bridge which taught his bidding system, running a weekly duplicate in Hampstead during World War II and playing rubber bridge regularly at the Hamilton Club and Lederer's. Stern became a naturalised British citizen in March 1948, a few months before his death.

He did not tolerate fools gladly at the bridge table. Once he was confronted with having thrown a cup of coffee at his partner, and said, "It was nothing serious. There was no sugar in it".

He suffered from diabetes.

== Publications ==
- Championship der international bridge league: Wien, 7.–12 juni 1934: 1800 Spiele (45 matches à 40 Spiele) (Vienna: Stern), 199 pp. – IBL Championship 1934 – Stern with the assistance of Egon Watza and Manfred Wlaschütz. OCLC 68512775
- Wir lizitieren ... die Ansagetechnik der Wiener Weltmeister (Vienna: Stern, 1937), 220 pp. OCLC 72406872
- Beating the Culbertsons: how the Austrians won the [first] world contract bridge championship; with 96 diagrams of the actual hands played and comments thereon (London: T. Werner Laurie, 1938), 128 pp. OCLC 660017838 – IBL Championship 1937
- —— (1938). The Stern Austrian System. London: George G. Harrap. 192 pp. – "Translated with the assistance of Margery Belsey." OCLC 504644018
- ——; Butler, Geoffrey L. (1940). The Two-Club System of Bidding. Faber and Faber. 300 pp. OCLC 69215610
- Darvas, Robert; Hart, Norman de Villiers (1947). Right Through the Pack: a bridge fantasy. Leeds: Contract Bridge Equipment Ltd. 220 pp. – Assisted by Stern. OCLC 559152645
- ——; Smith, Arthur Joseph (1945). Sorry, Partner: 120 everyday hands that have been mis-bid, mis-played or mis-defended, explained in detail with expert advice. Faber. LCCN 47017611. 141 pp. OCLC 723603804
- ——; Smith, A. J.; Hart, Norman de Villiers (1947). The Vienna System of Contract Bridge. Contract Bridge Equipment. 243 pp. – "New and complete text book." OCLC 13547916
