= Vienna System (bridge) =

The Vienna System or Austrian System was one of the earliest conventional bidding systems in the game of contract bridge. It was devised in 1935 by Austrian player Paul Stern.

The Vienna System used the Bamberger point count to evaluate bridge hands: A=7, K=5, Q=3, J=1. That method has been generally supplanted by the Work count (HCP) (A=4, K=3, Q=2, J=1).

The characteristic features of the Vienna System were not in its methods of hand evaluation, but in its bidding structure:

- 1♣ - minimum opener (up to about 17 HCP in modern terms), no 5-card suit except perhaps ♣. Forcing: responder is not allowed to pass. Responder's possible bids include:
  - 1♦ - a bad hand
  - 1♥♠2♣♦ - natural and forcing
  - 1NoTrump - artificial, forcing to game
  - 2♥ and higher jump bids - signoff, a so-called "negative jump response"
- 1♦♥♠ - minimum opener, 5-card suit. Responder's bids include:
  - 1NoTrump - no fit for opener's suit; encouraging but not forcing
- 1NoTrump - maximum opener (at least about 18 HCP in modern terms), undefined hand, forcing; responder may not pass. Responder's possible bids include:
  - 2♣ - a bad hand
  - 2♦♥♠3♣ - 5-card suit, game-forcing
  - 2NoTrump - no 5-card suit, game-forcing

Austrian teams captained by Stern, playing the Vienna System, won the European championships (Open category) in 1936 and 1937, and defeated Ely Culbertson's American team in a challenge match in 1937 (see: Bermuda Bowl#Predecessors).
