= Doris Rhodes =

British bridge player (1898–1982)

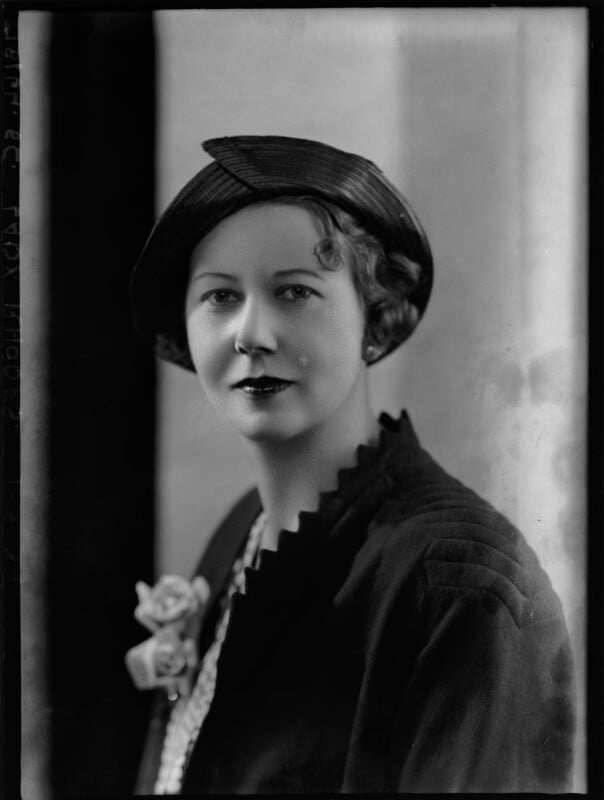
Rhodes in 1934

Doris Mary, Lady Rhodes (1898–1982) was Britain's leading female bridge player until the arrival of Rixi Markus. Rhodes was from London. Born Doris Mary Adams, she married Sir John Phillips Rhodes, 2nd Bt. She was described in the June 1947 issue of the Contract Bridge Journal as "a deceptively dangerous opponent; a misleadingly modest partner".

== Life in bridge ==
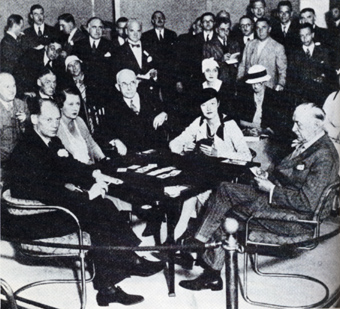
Beasley v Culbertson: some of the players at Claridges. Round the table from left: Ely Culbertson, Lady Doris Rhodes, referee GGJ Walshe, Josephine Culbertson, 'Pops' Beasley; left behind Ely is Hubert Phillips

With her husband and a Mrs Bosworth, she started a school for contract bridge in 1931; it was called the Lady Rhodes Bridge School, in Tite Street, Chelsea. Hubert Phillips claimed that she and Mrs Bosworth were the first two registered teachers of the Culbertson system in Britain. Rhodes became Culbertson's chief representative in Britain; Terence Reese mentions that she taught his mother, and gave her a Culbertson Teacher's Certificate.

Her career as an international player started in 1932 with matches against the Dutch and German teams at Grosvenor House Hotel, and against Denmark in Copenhagen. Also in 1932, she won the BBL Pairs Championship. In 1933 she played in one of the most famous matches in bridge history for 'Pops' Beasley's team against the Culbertson team for the Schwab trophy.

After World War II Rhodes played five times in the European Women's team championship. She was Rixi Markus' first partner in the British team: Markus described her as "A more than satisfactory partner [and] a good friend." Rhodes and Markus won the European title in 1951 and 1952, and in 1953 toured America in a British women's team. The pair twice defeated an American ladies team on this tour, and also won the prestigious Two Stars event. Rhodes also represented Britain in the women's team at the Olympiad of 1960.
