= Prepared opening bid =

Bridge (card game) tactic

In the game of bridge, a prepared opening bid is a bid which is not usual in the sense that it does not bid the longest suit first. The most common example of this is the better minor or short club opening bid.

Another example is a principle of bidding in bridge popularized by Howard Schenken in bridge columns that he wrote during the 1960s. In his book "Big Club", Schenken refers to the principle as "The Principle of Anticipation (or Preparedness)". The principle states that when choosing an opening bid, a player should be prepared for the possibility that his partner could respond in the opener's shortest suit; he should choose his opening bid and have an appropriate rebid ready for that eventuality. The "Principle of Preparedness" was originally used by Ely Culbertson in the 1930s and is referred to by various writers from that period.

== Example ==
♠	x x
♥	J x x x
♦	A J x
♣	10 x x x
N S
♠	K J 10
♥	x
♦	K Q x x
♣	K Q x x x

In the example on the left, South is the dealer and because he holds 14 high card points (HCP), he must open the bidding. If he were to open 1♣, his longest suit, he will get a 1♥ response from partner and according to Standard American methods, be obliged to rebid 1NT since a bid of 2♦ would be a reverse and show a more powerful hand than he has.

The partnership could easily be down several tricks in 1NT if the opponents' hearts split adversely and key black cards are in unfavorable positions. Schenken advocates an alternative treatment of this hand and recommends opener begin the auction with 1♦. Then, when responder replies with the anticipated 1♥ bid, opener can retreat to 2♣, which responder, with only 6 HCP, would pass. If responder's diamond holding were stronger, he could correct to 2♦. The partnership is more likely to make a 2♣ contract even against adverse defensive holdings.
