= Walter Buller (bridge) =

British auction and contract bridge organiser, player and writer

Lt. Col. Walter Buller (10 December 1886 – 21 May 1938) was a British auction and contract bridge organiser, player and writer, the leading British bridge personality at the start of the 1930s. Buller was from London.

== Life ==
Buller joined the Army Service Corps as a commissioned officer in 1907 and served throughout World War I, first as a Sixth Division captain in France and then as a staff officer in the War Office, where he became lieutenant colonel in 1917. He retired on pay in 1923 and thereafter lived in London.

== Bridge career ==
Buller was one of those responsible for contract bridge being adopted at the Portland Club, after the game and its new scoring system was brought to England by Lord Lascelles and Jimmie Rothschild in 1927. The Portland Club, which regulated the laws of whist since early in the nineteenth century, remains the law-giving body for bridge in Britain, and has taken part in every subsequent revision of the laws of bridge.

In Buller's bridge career, and his weekly column for the Star, he was a showman whose motto was "Must do something to stir them up!". As such, he was the perfect foil to Ely Culbertson, the publicist for contract bridge. Buller organised the first Anglo-American match against the Culbertson team in 1930, and captained the English team. This match inaugurated the 'Golden Age' of contract bridge, leading to an extraordinary amount of publicity in the press. Culbertson, a genius as a publicist, created many small incidents for the benefit of the press, and Buller did his best to provide quotable phrases in his interviews and his books.

Buller was the leading proponent of the direct bidding system called British Bridge. It prided itself on having no conventional (artificial) bids. He was a bridge columnist, and wrote several books. Buller won the first English National Pairs in 1932.

In the famous match at Almack's club the English team was Buller, Mrs Gordon Evers, Dr Nelson Wood-Hill FRCS and Cedric Kehoe RN. Mrs Gordon Evers was Walter Buller's favourite partner: "white-haired and striking, she had toured the United States as an actress in Sir Herbert Tree's company". The former world chess champion, Emanuel Lasker, reported the match for German and Austrian newspapers; he became a registered teacher of the Culbertson system.

The US team was Culbertson and his wife Josephine, Theodore Lightner and Waldemar von Zedwitz. All the members of the American team would be recognised as outstanding players in the years that followed. Both their partnerships were experienced and organised; the result of the match was not long in doubt. Culbertson won by 4,845 points over a week's play of 200 deals (total points scoring): not quite so bad for Buller as it might have been.

Hubert Phillips commented on the match:

"The Culbertson Forcing System was definitely vindicated. The contest showed that 'card sense', intelligent guesswork fortified by experience, cannot stand up against a methodical system of conveying information also fortified by card sense."

Later, in 1934, a match between Buller's team and Almack's Club was played, in which Almack's used ideas taken from Culbertson. Almack's won, knocking another nail in the coffin of Buller's system. The consequence was that direct and entirely natural bidding went out of favour, never to return. In the future, even natural bidding systems used detailed agreements and conventions.

== Publications ==
- Reflections of a Bridge Player, with a chapter on 'how to bid at contract' (London: Methuen & Co., 1929)
- From Auction to Contract: the logic of British Bridge (Methuen, 1932) – "Contains the famous accusation that forcing bids are equivalent to scratching one's head or blowing one's nose to convey information" –Leslie Parris, Contract bridge books
- How to Play Contract Bridge (London: The Star, 1932)
- Colonel Buller on the Beasley–Culbertson bridge contest, 1933: the 6303 calls reviewed and analysed (The Star, 1933) – contains "sustained vituperation against American methods ... always entertaining" –Leslie Parris
- The Buller–Almacks bridge contest (the best contract bridge yet seen in this country), Buller and Ewart Kempson (London: 1934) – discusses 76 of the 100 hands
- The Way to Play: The Buller system of contract bridge (The Star, 1936)

Buller also introduced the London News Chronicle's 222-page record of the 1930 match: International Bridge Test: complete record of bidding, play & scores in "duplicate" contract bridge match between England & America (London: News Chronicle, 1930)
