= Vienna System =

Vienna System may refer to:

- Vienna System (bridge), a bidding system in the game of contract bridge
- Vienna System (politics), a political system in 19th century Europe
- Vienna System (pottery), a system for classifying Ancient Egyptian pottery
