= Match of the Century =

Match of the Century has referred to many events in various sports:

== Contract bridge ==
- Bridge Battle of the Century, Lenz vs Culbertson, 1931–1932

== Chess ==
- The World Chess Championship 1972, between Bobby Fischer and defending champion Boris Spassky
- Several of the USSR and Russia versus the Rest of the World chess team matches, held in 1970, 1984, and 2002

== Golf ==
- The 1926 exhibition 72-hole match between Walter Hagen and Bobby Jones

== Horse racing ==
- The defeat of War Admiral by Seabiscuit on November 1, 1938

== Rugby football ==
- The Match of the Century (rugby union), played between Wales and New Zealand in 1905

== Association football ==
- Chelsea v Dynamo Moscow, the first match of Dynamo Moscow's 1945 tour of the United Kingdom
- The Match of the Century (1953 England v Hungary football match)
- Italy v West Germany (1970 FIFA World Cup), also called The Game of the Century
- United States v Iran (1998 FIFA World Cup)

== Australian football ==
- South Melbourne vs Geelong (1886 VFA season), also called the Game of the Century

== Tennis ==
- The Match of the Century (tennis), between Suzanne Lenglen and Helen Wills in 1926
- The Battle of the Sexes (tennis), exhibition match between Billie Jean King and Bobby Riggs

== See also ==
- Fight of the Century (disambiguation)
- The Game of the Century (disambiguation)
