= The Greatest Game Ever Played (disambiguation) =

The Greatest Game Ever Played is a 2005 film based on the life of Francis Ouimet

The Greatest Game Ever Played may also refer to:

- 1947 All-Ireland Hurling Final, a hurling match between arch-rivals Cork and Kilkenny.
- 1958 NFL Championship Game, the National Football League championship game between the Baltimore Colts and the New York Giants
- The 31 December 1975 tie game between the HC CSKA Moscow and the Montreal Canadiens during the 1976 Super Series
- Game 5 of the 1976 NBA Finals between the Boston Celtics and Phoenix Suns, tied for the longest NBA Finals game.
- Australia in South Africa, 5th ODI, 2006, a cricket game where both teams broke the world record for highest team totals in an innings
- Isner–Mahut match at the 2010 Wimbledon Championships, the 2010 Wimbledon Championships game at court 18
- Second Test, 2000–01 Border–Gavaskar Trophy, Underdog India won the match by 171 runs after being forced to follow-on, only the third time this has happened since Test cricket began in 1877

== See also ==
- The Game of the Century (disambiguation)
