= Alfred Gruenther =

United States Army general

- Gruenther as Supreme Allied Commander Europe
- Born: Alfred Maximilian Gruenther; 3 March 1899; Platte Center, Nebraska, U.S.
- Died: 30 May 1983 (aged 84); Washington, D.C., U.S.
- Burial place: Arlington National Cemetery
- Education: US Military Academy
- Military career
- Allegiance: United States
- Branch: United States Army
- Service years: 1918–1956
- Rank: General
- Service number: 0-12242
- Unit: Field Artillery Branch
- Commands: Supreme Allied Commander Europe (1953−1956)
- Conflicts: World War II
- Awards: Army Distinguished Service Medal (4)
- Other work: American Red Cross president (1957–1964)

General Alfred Maximilian Gruenther (3 March 1899 – 30 May 1983) was a senior United States Army officer, Red Cross president, and bridge player. After being commissioned towards the end of World War I, he served in the army throughout the interwar period and into World War II, where he was primarily a staff officer. Several years later, at the age of fifty-two, he became the second youngest four-star general in the history of the United States Army, after only Douglas MacArthur, and succeeded General Matthew Ridgway as NATO's Supreme Allied Commander in Europe (SACEUR) serving from 1953 to 1956.

== Early life and military career ==
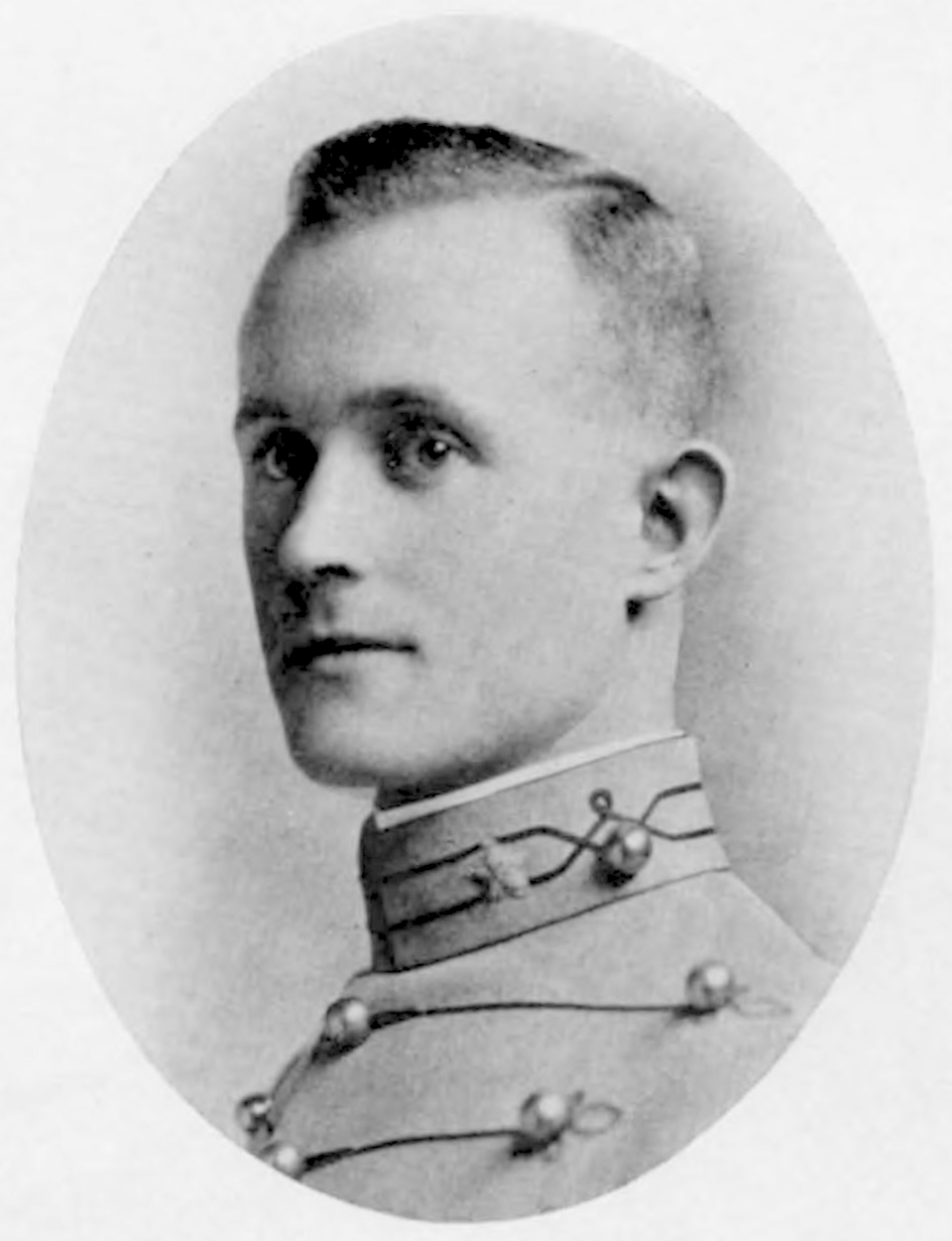
As a West Point cadet

Gruenther was born in Platte Center, Nebraska, the son of Mary "Mayme" Shea, a school teacher, and Maximilian Gruenther, a newspaper editor who published the Platte Center Signal.

He attended St. Thomas Academy in Saint Paul, Minnesota. In June 1917, he entered the United States Military Academy at West Point and after studying for nineteen months, graduated early due to the war, on 1 November 1918, with a rank of fourth in a class of 277. He was commissioned a second lieutenant in the Field Artillery but after the Armistice he was recalled to West Point to complete his training, and graduated a second time in June 1919.

Until May 1935, when he was promoted to captain, he served various tours of duty including teaching mathematics, electricity and chemistry at West Point for eight years. He was referee of the famous "Bridge Battle of the Century" in 1931–32.

In September 1941, Gruenther, now a major, took part in the Army's Louisiana Maneuvers, the largest war exercises since World War I. Nearly 400,000 troops were involved. His performance was noticed by the Chief of Staff of the General Headquarters, United States Army (GHQ), Lt. Gen. Lesley J. McNair.

In October 1941, Gruenther was promoted to lieutenant colonel, and became deputy chief of staff and then chief of staff of the Third Army as a colonel under Lt. Gen. Walter Krueger, headquartered in San Antonio, Texas. Gruenther's immediate commanding officer was Dwight D. Eisenhower, and the two became bridge partners.

== World War II ==
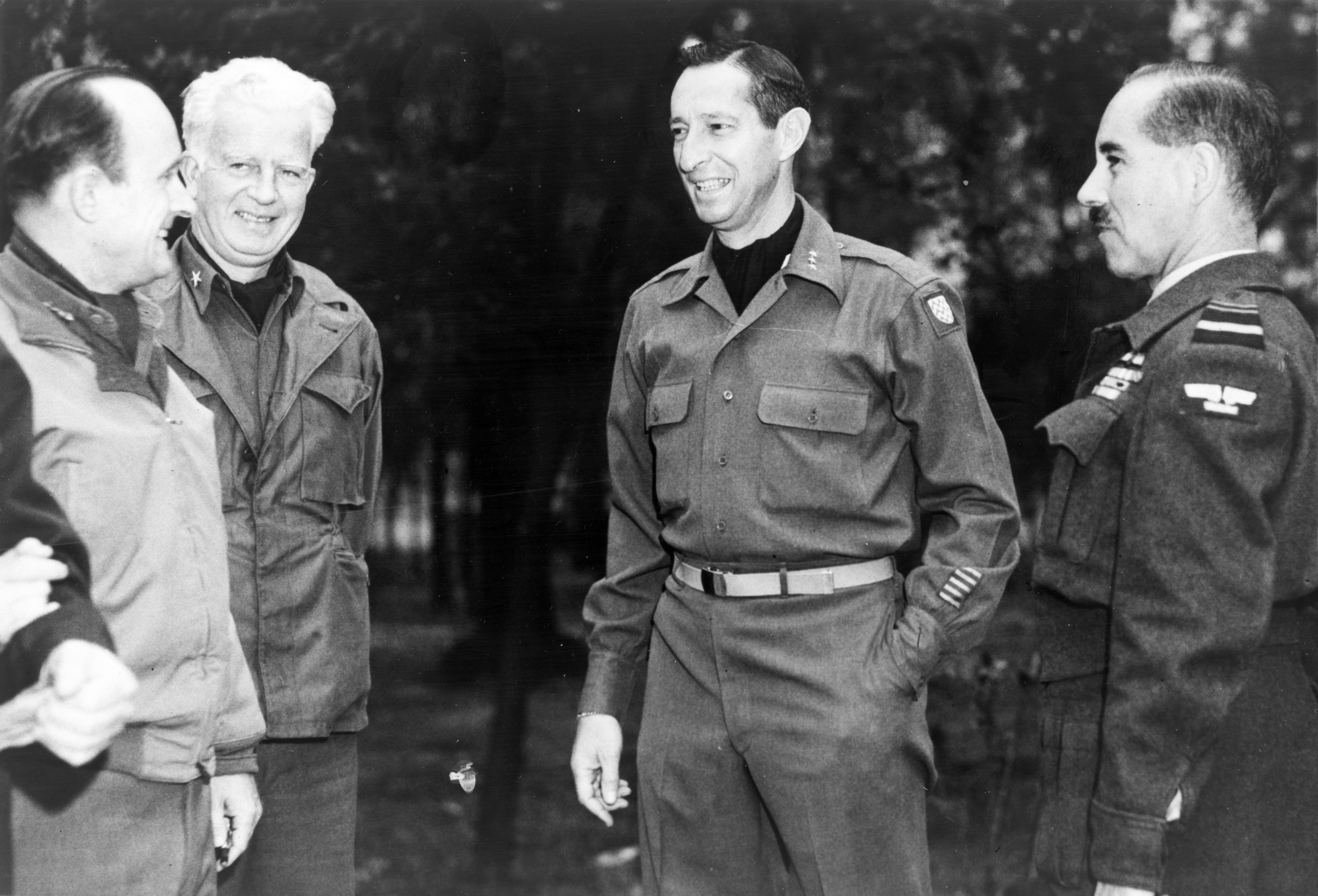
From left to right, Alfred Gruenther, Donald W. Brann, Mark W. Clark, and Guy Garrod

Gruenther was an adviser and planner to top generals in World War II. He possessed a strong power of analytical reasoning with capacity both to detail and overall perspective for which his colleagues called him "the Brain".

General Alphonse Juin with American generals Geoffrey Keyes, Mark W. Clark, Alfred M. Gruenther, and Lucian Truscott, at Rome City Hall on June 5, 1944.

In 1942, he was promoted to brigadier general and became a deputy chief of staff of Allied Force Headquarters in London under Gen. Eisenhower, who assigned him the Operation Torch development. A year later, he was promoted to major general and served as chief of staff of the Fifth Army, and the 15th Army Group under Gen. Mark W. Clark; he was the principal planner of the allied invasions of North Africa in 1942 and Italy in 1943.

== Post-war ==
After the end of World War II in 1945, Gruenther served as deputy commander of U.S. forces in Austria. In 1946–1947, he was appointed deputy commandant of the recently established National War College.

In 1947, he served as Director of the Joint Staff and then Joint Chiefs of Staff in 1947–1949. In 1949, he was promoted to the rank of lieutenant general and served as the U.S. Army's deputy chief of staff for plans and operations.

In 1951, Gruenther was promoted to four-star general and appointed as the Chief of Staff, Supreme Headquarters Allied Powers Europe (COFS SHAPE) under Gen. Eisenhower, who became the Supreme Allied Commander Europe (SACEUR). He continued to serve under Gen. Matthew Ridgway and later replaced him as SACEUR. From 11 July 1953 to 20 November 1956, he was Supreme Allied Commander, Europe/Commander in Chief, U.S. European Command (SACEUR/USCINCEUR). On 31 December 1956, Gruenther retired from the Army.

== Later years ==
In the 1956 presidential campaign, Gruenther's name was placed on the list of possible candidates for the Republican nomination after Eisenhower's heart attack on 24 September 1955. After serving two terms, President Eisenhower considered Gruenther as a possible alternative to Richard Nixon for the Republican presidential nomination in 1960, and later suggested Gruenther as a potential vice-president for Nixon, but ultimately realized that Gruenther did not have the political base required to get either place on the ticket.

Gruenther served on the boards of Dart Industries, Inc., New York Life Insurance Company, and Pan American World Airways. He also served on the Draper Committee and several presidential commissions on draft, health and disarmament. He was a president of the English-Speaking Union.

Gruenther died of complications of pneumonia at Walter Reed Army Hospital on 30 May 1983, and is buried at Arlington National Cemetery.

== Family ==
In 1922, Gruenther married Grace Elizabeth Crum of Jeffersonville, Indiana, who gave birth to two sons, Donald A. Gruenther, and Richard L. Gruenther; they both became career military officers. His great-grandson, USAF Captain Lucas Gruenther died at the age of 32 while flying an F-16 jet fighter on January 28, 2013, during a training mission over the Adriatic Sea.

== Head of American Red Cross ==
From January 1957 to March 1964, he was president of the American Red Cross. As head of the Red Cross, Gruenther personally visited and inspected disaster areas in the United States. He made frequent public appearances, captivating the audience with "easy manner and conversational style." He received several awards for International Red Cross related activities, which included visits to Russia and Poland.

== Bridge expert ==
Being a bridge practitioner, Gruenther published several books on the subject, including Duplicate Contract Complete: A Guide to Playing in and Conducting All Duplicate Bridge Contests, and served as a referee at bridge national tournaments. In 1931, he refereed the Culbertson-Lenz bridge championship in New York City which was dubbed by the press as "The Bridge Battle of the Century". After the West Point superintendent received a complaint about a full-time officer spending nights at bridge tournament, he audited Gruenther's 8 a.m. class. The Superintendent reported to his superiors that, "If I could be certain that being a bridge referee would have the same salutary effect on all the Military Academy's instructors as it has had on Lt. Gruenther, I would demand that they all become bridge referees in their spare time. I have never seen a finer chemistry instructor than Lt. Gruenther." Gruenther was considered the best bridge player in the U.S. Army, and was Dwight D. Eisenhower's favorite partner. Eisenhower was playing bridge when, in 1948, President Truman telephoned him to ask him to take the post of head of NATO, in Paris. On returning to the table, he was asked who he would appoint as his second-in-command. "Well, I ought to take Bedell Smith, but I think I'll take Gruenther because he's the better bridge player". He was an honorary member of the National Laws Commission of the American Contract Bridge League. He served as honorary president of the World Bridge Federation 1958–78.

== Recognition ==
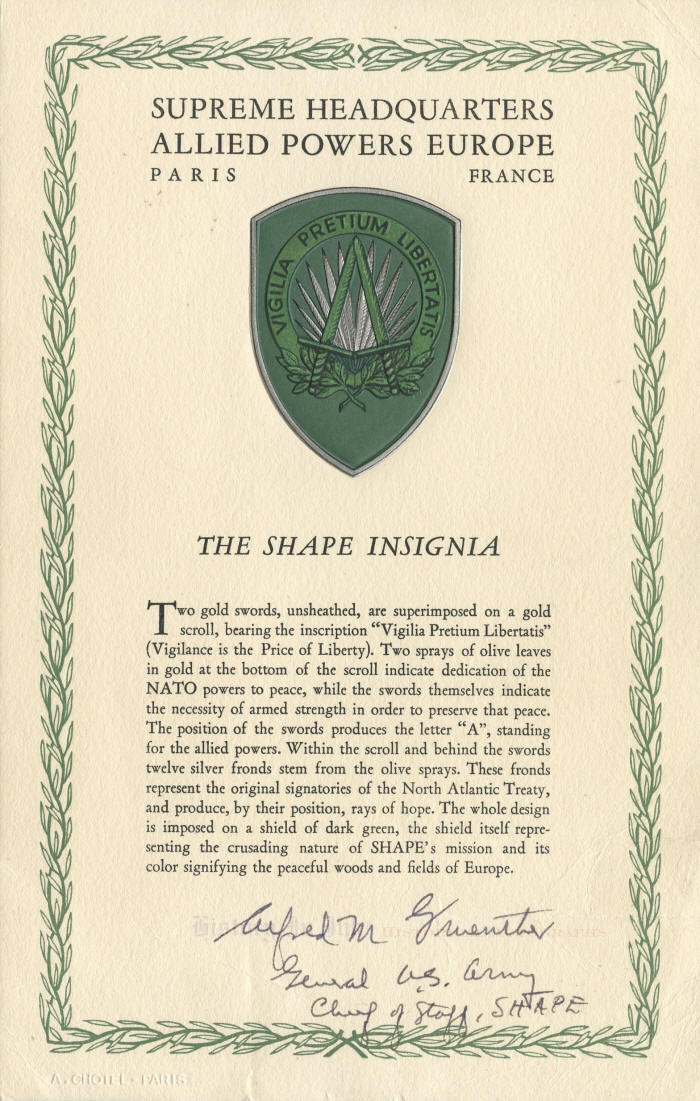
A 1953 brochure on the symbol of Supreme Headquarters Allied Powers Europe (SHAPE), signed by Gruenther

Gen. Eisenhower characterized Gruenther as "one of the ablest all-around officers, civilian or military, I have encountered." Gruenther served with distinction as staff officer in U.S. military operations in the Mediterranean theater of World War II in 1942–1945, and as supreme Allied commander in Europe, during the Cold War in 1953–1956.

In 1952, Gruenther became the youngest four-star general in U.S. history He is also sometimes credited to be the youngest major general in the U.S. Army in World War II, but that distinction belongs to James M. Gavin, who, as commander of the 82nd Airborne Division, was promoted to major general at the age of 37.

Gruenther was featured on the cover of Time magazine on 6 February 1956. He appeared as a guest on the 10 February 1957, episode of the popular TV quiz show What's My Line and on the 10 March 1957, episode of Meet the Press.

Gruenther was the recipient of many national medals, including the Distinguished Service Medal with three oak leaf clusters, and honorary degrees from several American universities, including a Litt.D. from Bates College (1958). Altogether, he had honorary degrees from 38 universities and colleges and decorations from 20 nations.

== See also ==
- List of United States Army four-star generals
- List of Supreme Allied Commanders Europe

Military offices
Preceded by Matthew Ridgway	Supreme Allied Commander Europe (NATO); 1953—1956	Succeeded by Lauris Norstad
