= Wilbur C. Whitehead =

American bridge player

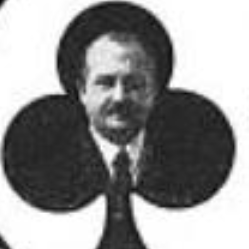
Whitehead in 1927

Wilbur Cherrier Whitehead (1866–1931) was an American auction bridge and contract bridge player and writer.

Whitehead was president of the Simplex Automobile Company but retired in 1910 to devote himself to bridge. He invented several conventions of bidding and play and was instrumental in standardizing procedures in auction bridge and later in contract bridge.

Whitehead was one of the members of the Bridge Headquarters, a group of experts who developed a bidding system named the Official System. Sidney Lenz (another Bridge Headquarters member) deployed this system against Ely Culbertson in the so-called "Bridge Battle of the Century" of 1931. (Whitehead had helped Culbertson during Culberton's early days of poverty).

Whitehead was a member of the team that won the Vanderbilt Cup in its first year (1928) and finished second the following year. He was a contributing editor of Bridge World. He wrote a daily bridge column, "Sound Auction Bridge", which appeared in the New York Evening Journal.

In 1930 he donated the Whitehead Trophy, which is still given to the winner of the Whitehead Women's Pairs, an annual tournament.

== Publications ==
Author

- —— (1913). Royal Spades. London: Mudie & Sons..
- —— (1914). Conventions of Auction Bridge. New York: Frederick A. Stokes Company.
- —— (1921). Auction Bridge Standards With A Complete Explanation Of The Art Of Bidding. New York: Frederick A. Stokes Company.
- —— (1923). Auction Bridge / Authoritative Leads and Conventions of Play. New York: John H. Smith Pub. Corp.
- —— (1925). Auction Bridge Summary. New York: Frederick A. Stokes Company.
- —— (1926). Complete Auction Bridge. New York: Frederick A. Stokes Company.
- —— (1928). Auction Bridge for Beginners. New York: Frederick A. Stokes Company.
- —— (1928). Contract Bridge Standards. New York: Frederick A. Stokes Company.
- —— (1929). New Picture Method Bridge. New York: Experimenter.
- —— (1929). Studio Lessons in Contract Bridge. New York: Author..
- —— (1929). Championship Bridge Hands. New York: Frederick A. Stokes Company.
- —— (1929). Winning Bridge. New York: Frederick A. Stokes Company.
- —— (1929). How to Win at Bridge. New York: Experimenter.
- —— (1930). The Teaching of Auction and Contract bridge. New York: Frederick A. Stokes Company.
- —— (1930). Bridge Made Easy / Contract and Auction / Series No. 1. New York: Frederick A. Stokes Company.
- —— (1930). Contract at a Glance. New York: Frederick A. Stokes Company.
- —— (1930). Quick and Easy Contract Bridge / Quick and Easy Auction Bridge. New York: Author.
- —— (1930). Play Auction Bridge. New York: De Bower Pub.
- —— (1930). The Contract Bridge Yellow Book. London: Eyre & Spottiswoode.
- —— (1931). What (To Do) And Why — Contract Bridge. New York: Frederick A. Stokes Company.

Co-author

- ——; Cook, Frank A. (1928). Duplicate Auction Bridge. New York: Frederick A. Stokes Company.

Editor

- Cochran, Thomas C. (1926). —— (ed.). Auction Bridge Handbook. Henry Holt & Company.

Forward

- Mott-Smith, Geoffrey (1927). Contract Bridge and Advanced Auction Bidding. New York: Minton Balch.
- Smith, Victor (1930). Contract Bridge Simplified. Miami, Florida: Smith Bridge Studios.
