= Nathan B. Spingold =

American film executive

- Born: 1886; Chicago, US
- Died: June 14, 1958 (aged 71–72); New York City, US
- Occupation(s): Lawyer, newspaper reporter, agent, film executive

Nathan Spingold (1886–June 14, 1958) was a motion picture executive and a leading administrator in the game of contract bridge.

== Biography ==
Born in Chicago, Spingold studied law at the Kent College of Law before becoming a newspaper reporter. He worked for the Chicago Examiner, the Chicago Record-Herald and the Chicago Tribune.

Spingold entered show business when William Morris wanted a press agent for a Harry Lauder tour. Morris asked his Chicago manager to "hire that reporter with the big nose" allegedly meaning Jack Lait, but the manager hired Spingold instead. He moved to New York in the early 1930s with the William Morris Agency and later joined The Shubert Organization, managing entertainment personalities. He joined Columbia Pictures in 1932 in a public relations capacity where his career in the motion picture business saw him rise to the board of directors in 1940. In 1943, he became vice president of advertising, publicity and exploitation and in 1954 he became general vice-president of the company. Spingold was the third largest shareholder at Columbia, behind founders Harry Cohn and Jack Cohn, and was one of the few executives who stood up to Harry.

=== Bridge ===
Active in contract bridge from its earliest days, he donated the Spingold Trophy in 1934 for the World Championship Masters Team-of-Four; the trophy is still among the most prized achievements in the game. Spingold was named American Bridge League (ABL) honorary member in 1936 and became president of the American Contract Bridge League (ACBL) in 1938, having been key to its creation by the merger of the ABL and the United States Bridge Association (USBA) the previous year. On the ACBL board of governors, its board of directors and also president of the Cavendish Club in New York, he was regarded as one of the most influential men in contract bridge administration in the 1930s and 1940s.

=== Personal life ===
His wife, Frances, was known as Madame Frances, one of the most successful couturiers. They were patrons of the arts and had a significant art collection, including many French Impressionist paintings and contemporary American art. They donated art to The Metropolitan Museum of Art, the Museum of Modern Art and a museum in Israel. They lived in New York City at 12 East 77th Street (formerly owned by Reginald Claypoole Vanderbilt) and also owned a mansion in Palm Beach, Florida which was a well known social centre. Spingold was also a director of the Palm Beach Country Club.

He was a fellow of Brandeis University.

=== Illness and death ===
Spingold had been having issues with his vocal chords and been hospitalized for chest conditions which restricted his working. He was homebound throughout 1958 and died at home on June 14, 1958, after a long illness.
