= Savoy Club =

Contract bridge club in California

The Savoy Club was a contract bridge club established in May 1966 on Sunset Strip, Hollywood, California.

Founded by Frank Van Haraz, acquired a year later by the group of Lorne Greene, Lew Mathe, Norman Moss and George Bassman, it quickly came under the sole ownership and control of George Bassman. The club had a reciprocal agreement with the Cavendish Club of New York. The facility provided a plush playing environment augmented by lounge and dining areas and a complete bridge library.
