= Golf Association of Philadelphia =

- Formation: 1897
- Purpose: Preserve, Protect, and Promote the Game of Golf
- Headquarters: 1974 Sproul Road; Broomall, PA 19008; United States
- Region served: Philadelphia metropolitan area
- Official language: English
- Parent organization: United States Golf Association
- Website: GAP Website

The Golf Association of Philadelphia (GAP) is the oldest regional golf association in the United States. The Golf Association of Philadelphia was founded in 1897 by members of Aronimink Golf Club, Merion Cricket Club, Philadelphia Country Club, and Philadelphia Cricket Club. Its 150 member clubs are spread across Pennsylvania, New Jersey, and Delaware. The purpose of the association is to preserve, protect and promote the game of golf.

== History ==
=== 1894 meeting ===
On December 22, 1894, delegates from five clubs – St. Andrews Golf Club, Shinnecock Hills Golf Club, Newport Golf Club, The Country Club (Brookline, Massachusetts), and Chicago Golf Club – met at the Calumet Club in Manhattan to form the Amateur Golf Association of the United States (subsequently to change its name, first to The American Golf Association, then to the United States Golf Association). Less than a month afterwards the Essex Country Club and the Philadelphia Country Club were elected to membership, the sixth and seventh on the roll.

=== GAP founded ===
A little more than two years later, the Golf Association of Philadelphia was founded. It was America's first regional golf association. Once again, the Devon Golf Club served as a spur. For it was on this organization's course that the first inter-club team match in the Philadelphia area was played. On October 15, 1896, a team representing Philadelphia Cricket Club squared off against Devon's top players. The Cricket Club won 22 to 12. The occasion was so enjoyable that the appeal of inter-club matches on a broader scale was discussed and embraced. The obvious outgrowth of such thinking was the formation of an association of local golf clubs to organize and administer these competitions.

On February 5, 1897, seven men gathered at the Market Street National Bank for the express purpose of founding the Golf Association of Philadelphia. Representing the Belmont Golf Association (soon to be reorganized into the Aronimink Golf Club) were Milton C. Work and Dr. Henry Toulmin. From Merion Cricket Club came Rodman E. Griscom and Walter E. Stephenson. Philadelphia Country Club's delegates were George D. Fowle and Isaac T. Starr. Samuel Y. Heebner alone represented Philadelphia Cricket Club, Alan H. Harris being unavoidably absent.

=== Objectives and membership ===
The objective of the fledgling association was simplicity itself: to promote interest in the game of golf and to regulate all competitions between member clubs. In order to join the Association, a club had to be formally organized, have at least nine holes of golf for its exclusive use, and belong to the United States Golf Association. At the outset four clubs - the four founding clubs - were named Associate Members of the Golf Association of Philadelphia. Most clubs which would follow were accepted into the association as Allied Members. The difference was significant: Associate Member clubs had the right to be represented at the annual meeting by two delegates, each with one vote. Allied Members, on the other hand, could send only one delegate to the meeting and he has no vote. Moreover, the Association's three officers - president, vice-president, and secretary-treasurer - could be elected from the rosters of Associate Member clubs. The same was true of the other two members of the executive committee.

The annual dues were $25 for Associate Member clubs, $10 for Allied Members, the bargain rate doubtless a reflection of the latter category's powerless position in the scheme of things. With the passing of the years, this distinction between the two classes of membership would blur and finally, with a revision of the by-laws, be eliminated.

=== First elections ===
At an organizational meeting two months later, on April 5, 1897, George D. Fowle, Philadelphia Country Club, was elected the first president of the Golf Association of Philadelphia. Dr. Henry Toulmin, Belmont, was elected vice president, and Alan Harris, of the Cricket Club, secretary-treasurer. Named to join these three on the then five-man Executive Committee (it would become a seven-member body in 1901) were Samuel Heebner, of the Cricket Club, and Louis A. Biddle, of the Country Club and Merion.

=== First matches ===
Once the officers and executive committee were in place, little time was lost in launching the first interclub team matches. That year the Association's four founding clubs each fielded two teams, six players per team, for a total of 48 players in the "league." Matches were played in both spring and fall. When the final tally for the year was in, Merion's 1st team and the Cricket Club's 2nd team were the winners. The only other competition in the Golf Association's first season was what was then called the Individual Championship Tournament, today known as the Philadelphia Amateur Championship.

== GAP Team Matches ==
The GAP Team Matches, originally known as the Interclub Matches, served as the basis for the founding of the Association in 1897. Teams compete in a four-team sectional round-robin format (which equates to three matches in three weeks). A total of 12 players per team compete with six players staying home and six traveling to the opponent's club. Clubs are divided and placed in Divisions AA through F based on the previous year's results. Playoff and Challenges determined the top divisions’ clubs. It is believed that the GAP Team Matches are the single-largest golfing team competition in the country.

== Tournaments ==
The Golf Association of Philadelphia conducts over 60 tournaments annually from April to October. The schedule features events available for players of all ages (Junior, Amateur and Senior) and skill level (championship and handicap). It also includes the Association's four Majors: the Middle-Amateur Championship, Amateur Championship, Open Championship and Joseph H. Patterson Cup. At the season's conclusion, GAP awards “Player of the Year” honors on four levels: Amateur, Junior, Senior and Super-Senior. It also acknowledges a Junior Sportsman of the Year, Volunteer of the Year and Distinguished Service Award recipient.
