= Austrian Bridge Federation =

National organization in Austria

The Austrian Bridge Federation (German: Österreichischer Bridgesportverband) is the national organization charged with regulating and promoting the card game of bridge in Austria. Its headquarters are in Vienna, and there are four regional federations (Landesverbände) and 39 clubs. In 2026, it had about 2,200 members. The current president is Klaus Schilhan.

During the years preceding World War II, Austria was one of the strongest bridge nations, winning the European Open Team Championship in 1932, 1933 and 1936 and the European Women's Team Championship in 1935 and 1936. Achievements after World War II includes Winning of the World Pairs Championship 1970, European Junior Team Championship 1976, European Women's Team Championship 1991, European Junior Pairs Championship 1999 and 2001. It is one of the oldest bridge federations in the world.

== Executive board ==
=== Presidents ===
- President: Klaus Schilhan
- Vice-president: Manuela Turcsanyi

=== Members ===
- Susanne Buchmayr
- Sophie Hermann
- Otto Knapp
- Klaus Köpplinger
- Clemens Wanha

== History ==
The federation was founded in 1929 by Paul Stern (1892–1948), who was also its first president.

== See also ==
- Austria
- World Bridge Federation
- List of bridge federations
- Austrian bridge players
