= Edward V. Shepard =

American bridge writer (1866–1937)

- Born: 1866; Salem, Massachusetts, United States
- Died: February 9, 1937 (aged 70–71); Manhattan, New York City, United States
- Education: MIT
- Occupations: auction and contract bridge writer, authority, and teacher
- Known for: apply mathematical analysis to bridge
- Notable work: Scientific Auction Bridge
- Parents: Samuel Shepard (father); Sarah Woodward Shepard (mother)

Edward Valentine Shepard (1866–1937) was an American auction bridge and contract bridge writer, authority, and teacher in the early twentieth century.

== Life, career, and works ==
Shepard was a native of Salem, Massachusetts, the son of Samuel Shepard and Sarah Woodward Shepard. He was graduated from MIT in 1889 with a civil engineering degree, after which he worked in South America and Mexico as well as Massachusetts, also working for the United States Patent Office and teaching at Columbia University. He also devoted many years to his bridge career.

Shepard's engineering training led him to apply mathematical analysis to bridge. His 1913 work Scientific Auction Bridge was the first American book to deal extensively with the mathematics and distribution of bridge hands.

Shepard was one of the twelve members of the Bridge Headquarters, organized in 1931 and representing bridge's "old guard" against the insurgent Ely Culbertson.

Shepard was an honorary member of the British Bridge League and the American Bridge League. The Shepard Club, an early Portland, Maine, bridge club organized by John B. Thomes, was named in his honor.

Shepard died February 9, 1937, at home in Manhattan.

== Publications ==
- Shepard, Edward Valentine (2012) [1913]. Scientific Auction Bridge: A Clear Exposition of the Game to Aid Both the Beginner and the Experienced Player, With explicit and Easy Rules for Bidding and Playing (Reprint ed.). [New York & London]: [Harper] Nabu Press. ISBN 978-1286411711. LCCN 13006351.
- Shepard, Edward Valentine (1913). Expert Auction: A Clear Exposition of the Game as Actually Played by Experts. New York & London: Harper and Brothers. LCCN 16015351.
- Shepard, Edward Valentine (1920). Correct Auction. New York & London: Harper and Brothers. LCCN 20021194.
- Shepard, Edward Valentine (1923). Auction To Win: A Textbook Demonstrating the Highest Type of Game as Developed and Played by Leading Experts. New York: Reynolds Publishing Company. LCCN 23009586.
- Shepard, Edward Valentine (c. 1927). Win At Bridge: Auction Bridge Made Simpler, More Definite, Easier to Win; Contract Bridge Introduced. New York: Reynolds Publishing Company. LCCN 27011507.
- Shepard, Edward Valentine (1929). Correct Contract Bridge; including the official laws of contract bridge adopted by the Whist Club, New York, and by all the leading clubs in America. New York: Doubleday, Doran and Company. LCCN 29013873.
- Shepard, Edward Valentine (1930). Contract Bridge Summary. Tulsa, Oklahoma: Banknote Printing Company. LCCN 30016946.
- Shepard, Edward Valentine (1931). Contract Bridge Standardized. New York: Cosmopolitan Book Corporation. LCCN 31025606.
