= James Jacoby =

American bridge player and writer

James Oswald Jacoby (April 4, 1933 – February 8, 1991) was an American bridge player and writer. He played as Jim Jacoby but he wrote books as James and for many years co-wrote a syndicated bridge column with his father as "Jacoby on Bridge" by Oswald and James Jacoby. (He wrote a re-branded newspaper bridge column after his father's death.)

He won 16 "national" (ACBL) championships, first at age 22 in 1955, and he was the most successful ACBL tournament player (masterpoints leader) during 1988.

Jacoby may have inherited talent and interest in games not only from his legendary father Oswald Jacoby. He and his mother Mary Zita Jacoby co-wrote The New York Times Book of Backgammon (1973). LCCN 73-79915

Jacoby graduated from the University of Notre Dame. He was a long-time resident of Texas and an original, 1968 member of the professional bridge team formed by Texas businessman Ira Corn, variously known as the Aces, Dallas Aces, and Texas Aces.

Jacoby had a wife, Judy, with whom he had a son, Jim Jacoby, Jr. He was a resident of Richardson, Texas, when he died of cancer in a Dallas hospital at age 58.

In teams-of-four competition Jacoby was a member of four world champions. The Aces won the Bermuda Bowl both in 1970 as U.S. representative and in 1971 as defending champion. United States won the 8th quadrennial World Team Olympiad in 1988 (its first win in the open flight, in a field of 56 national teams). Jacoby also led the winning mixed team in 1972 as playing captain.

At pairs Jacoby won world silver medals in the 1966 Open Pairs with Dr. John Fisher and in the 1978 Mixed Pairs with Heitie Noland (quadrennial events in non-Olympic even years).

Jacoby was inducted into the ACBL Hall of Fame in 1997.

== Bridge accomplishments ==
=== Awards and honors ===
- Barry Crane Trophy, 1988
- ACBL Hall of Fame, 1997
