= Oswald Jacoby =

American bridge player (1902–1984)

Oswald "Ozzie", "Jake" Jacoby (December 8, 1902 – June 27, 1984) was an American contract bridge player and author, considered one of the greatest bridge players of all time and a key innovator in the game, having helped popularize widely used bidding moves such as Jacoby transfers. He also excelled at, and wrote about, other games including backgammon, gin rummy, canasta, and poker. He was from Brooklyn, New York and later lived in Dallas, Texas. He was the uncle of activist and author Susan Jacoby, as well as father of James Jacoby, an author and world-class bridge player in his own right.

== Early life ==
Born in Brooklyn to a Jewish family, he was taught to play whist at the age of six and played his first bridge at ten. During World War I, he joined the army at 15 by lying about his age but spent most of his time there playing poker. Dropping out of Columbia University (where he was in the class of 1922) as a math major to become an actuary, he became the youngest person ever to pass four examinations of the Society of Actuaries at the age of 21. Having an exceptional aptitude for mathematics, Jacoby could multiply three and four digit numbers in his head without benefit of paper. During World War II and the Korean War, he applied these abilities to counterintelligence and cryptanalysis being referred to as a human computer; later, he lectured on probability at M.I.T. and wrote books on mathematics. However, his passion and lifelong focus was games, especially bridge.

== Bridge career ==
By the end of the twenties, Jacoby had achieved fame as a player at both auction and contract bridge, further gaining international recognition when chosen by Sidney Lenz to be his partner in the famous Culbertson–Lenz match (the "Bridge Battle of the Century") in 1931. Jacoby's more aggressive bidding style confused Lenz and Jacoby withdrew after Lenz's criticism. Years later the analyst Terence Reese wrote, "That the Culbertsons did not win more easily ... was due to the fact that Jacoby was a player of quite different class from any of the others". Jacoby subsequently solidified his position as the most successful tournament player in the thirties as a member of the famous "Four Horsemen" from 1931 to 1933 and the "Four Aces" from 1933 to 1941, dominating tournament play. He is recognized by the American Contract Bridge League (ACBL) as Life Master #2, one of ten named in 1936. (Note: Jacoby and nine others were named Life Masters by the American Bridge League in 1936. The ACBL was established by mergers of competing organizations, completed late in 1937, and it continued the ABL Life Master title and master points program.) LM #1 is David Burnstine, his partner on the Four Horsemen and co-founder of the Four Aces.

He pioneered many bidding ideas, including the Jacoby transfer and Jacoby 2NT bids. Throughout his career, he also worked as a bridge columnist; a prolific writer, he wrote over 10,000 newspaper articles on bridge, and his many books include not only bridge but volumes on poker, gin rummy, canasta, and the mathematics of card games and gambling, which he played at high stakes. He also released a record titled How to Win at Championship Bridge.

Jacoby captained the North American and US teams that won the Bermuda Bowl in both 1970 and 1971. During a long playing career, he won tournaments with many partners including his son and co-author, James Jacoby (1933–1991), as well as his wife of more than 50 years, Mary Zita Jacoby. Terminally ill, his final tournament victory came in a major event at the ACBL North American Bridge Championships late in 1983, as a member of the team-of four champions for the Reisinger trophy with Edgar Kaplan, Norman Kay, Bill Root and Richard Pavlicek. In the same year, he was named Personality of the Year by the international bridge writers (Charles H. Goren Award). He died at his Dallas home of cancer on June 27, 1984.

Jacoby, Lenz, and Milton Work were named to its hall of fame by The Bridge World in 1965, which brought the number of members to six. They were all made founding members of the ACBL Hall of Fame in 1995. (Note: The Bridge World monthly magazine, established by Ely Culbertson in 1929, named nine members of its bridge hall of fame including Culbertson from 1964 to 1966, but it never named another. Almost thirty years later, the ACBL established its hall of fame with the Bridge World nine as founding members. It named eight new members in 1995 and has inducted others annually since then.)

== Other games ==
A poker player and author on the subject, Jacoby was convicted of a gambling charge in 1944 while in the navy, but acquitted of a charge of conduct unbecoming an officer and a gentleman. Although he did not pursue a career in competitive chess, and did not write on the game, he was nevertheless a strong player. When in college, Jacoby beat US chess champion Frank Marshall, and in 1963, in a rapid-transit game, he played a draw with Tigran Petrosian, the then world champion.

Jacoby was also an expert backgammon player, and in 1972 he was crowned World Backgammon Champion. In 1970, he wrote The Backgammon Book with John R. Crawford, which is considered the first book to deal with backgammon from an analytical viewpoint. The Jacoby Rule, which states that in money play gammons and backgammons count only after the cube has been turned, is named after him.

He wrote several books on various card games, with a particular interest in gin rummy and canasta.

== Bridge accomplishments ==
=== Honors ===
- ACBL Hall of Fame, 1965
- ACBL Honorary Member of the Year 1967
- Honorary World Bridge Federation Grand Master

=== Awards ===
- Charles H. Goren Award (Personality of the Year), 1983, from the International Bridge Press Association
- McKenney Trophy 1959, 1961, 1962, 1963
- Herman Trophy 1960

=== Wins ===
- IBL World Championship (1) 1935
- North American Bridge Championships (31)
  - Vanderbilt (7) 1931, 1934, 1935, 1937, 1938, 1946, 1965
  - Asbury Park Trophy (now Spingold) (4) 1931, 1932, 1933, 1937
  - Masters Teams-of-Four (now Spingold) (2) 1934, 1936
  - Spingold (5) 1938, 1939, 1945, 1950, 1959
  - Chicago (now Reisinger) (1) 1955
  - Reisinger (1) 1983
  - Men's Board-a-Match Teams (2) 1952, 1959
  - Master Mixed Teams (1) 1968
  - Life Master Pairs (1) 1936
  - Fall National Open Pairs (2) 1935, 1960
  - Open Pairs (1) 1964
  - Men's Pairs (3) 1934, 1939, 1949
  - Master Individual (1) 1935
- United States Bridge Association (5)
  - Grand National Open Teams (3) 1934, 1935, 1937
  - Open Pairs (2) 1936, 1937
- American Bridge League (2)
  - Men's Teams (2) 1931, 1932

=== Runners-up ===
- North American Bridge Championships (21)
  - Vanderbilt (3) 1930, 1941, 1949
  - Spingold (4) 1941, 1948, 1949, 1957
  - Chicago (now Reisinger) (5) 1931, 1932, 1939, 1956, 1960
  - Men's Board-a-Match Teams (2) 1954, 1956
  - Master Mixed Teams (2) 1935, 1941
  - Life Master Pairs (2) 1939, 1941
  - Fall National Open Pairs (1) 1932
  - Hilliard Mixed Pairs (2) 1931, 1939

== Publications ==
Bridge

- Culbertson, Ely; Culbertson, Josephine; Lightner, Theodore A.; von Zedtwitz, Waldemar (1932). "including additional analyses by Oswald Jacoby...". Famous Hands of the Culbertson-Lenz Match. New York: The Bridge World. LCCN 32020030. 438 pages.
- Watson, Louis H. "Foreword by Oswald Jacoby". Watson on the Play of the Hand at Contract Bridge (1934 ed.). New York: Louis Copeland Co. 492 pages.
- —; Schenken, Howard; Gottlieb, Michael; Burnstine, David (1935). The Four Aces System of Contract Bridge (1st ed.). New York: Random House. 302 pages.
- —; Schenken, Howard; Maier, Merwin; Burnstine, David (1938). Five Suit Bridge by the Four Aces (1st ed.). New York: Simon & Schuster. 96 pages.
- — (1954). What's New in Bridge (1st ed.). Garden City, New York: Hanover House. 158 pages.
- — (1955). Point Count Bidding in Bridge (1st ed.). Cleveland, OH: Nea Service. 32 pages.
- — (1960). Hear How to Play Winning Bridge (Vinyl phonograph record). (Carlton Hear How Series). New York: Carlton Record Corp.
- — (1960). Point Count Bidding Made Easy (1st ed.). New York: Arco Playing Card Co. 31 pages.
- — (1963). Win at Bridge with Oswald Jacoby: America's winningest bridge champion (1st ed.). New York: Newspaper Enterprise Assoc'n. 64 pages.
- — (1963). Oswald Jacoby's Master Bridge (1st ed.). Fort Worth, TX: (Author). 32 pages.
- The Complete Book of Duplicate Bridge (1965).
- with Jacoby, James (1966). Win at Bridge with Jacoby & Son (1st ed.). New York: GP Putnam's Sons. LCCN 67-10956. 222 pages.
- with Jacoby, James (1970). Win at Bridge with Jacoby Modern (1st ed.). New York: Enterprise Publishers. 128 pages.
- Jacoby Transfer Bids (1981).
- Major Suit Raises (1981).
- with Jacoby, James (1983). Improve Your Bridge with Oswald Jacoby: 125 Bridge Hands from the Master (1st ed.). New York: McGraw Hill. ISBN 0-07-032238-4. 140 pages.

Poker

- Poker, 1940
- Oswald Jacoby on Poker. Revised edition, 1948
- Winning poker, 1949
- Oswald Jacoby on Poker (1981), ISBN 978-0-385-17590-6

Backgammon

- The Backgammon Book (with John R. Crawford), 1970, ISBN 0-670-14409-6

Rummy

- Laws of Oklahoma, 1946
- Oswald Jacoby on Gin Rummy, etc., 1947
- Oswald Jacoby on Oklahoma, the wild, wild rummy game, 1948
- How to Win at Gin Rummy, 1959

Canasta

- Oswald Jacoby's Complete Canasta, 1950
- How to win at canasta, 1951

Other card games

- The book of card game rules and strategies, 1989
- The fireside book of cards, 1957
- Oswald Jacoby on Gambling, 1963,
- New Recreations with Magic Squares (with William H. Benson), 1976
- Jacoby on card games, 1986
- Magic cubes : new recreations, 1981

Mathematics

- Intriguing Mathematical Problems (with William H. Benson), 1996
- How to figure the odds, 1947
- Mathematics for pleasure, 1962

== See also ==
- Four Aces
