= George Bassman =

- Born: George Bassman; February 7, 1914
- Origin: New York City, New York, U.S.
- Died: June 26, 1997 (aged 83) Los Angeles, California, U.S.
- Occupations: Composer, arranger

George Bassman (February 7, 1914 – June 26, 1997) was an American composer and arranger.

== Biography ==
Born in New York City to a Ukrainian- and Lithuanian-Jewish émigré couple, Bassman was later raised in Boston and began studying music at the Boston Conservatory while still a boy.

He studied orchestration and composition formally, but, against his father's wishes, in his teens he left home to play piano in an itinerant jazz group, and subsequently worked as an arranger for Fletcher Henderson in New York.

Through that gig, he became part of the burgeoning swing/big band scene and was soon writing songs as well. Bassman peaked in that career when he and Ned Washington wrote "I'm Getting Sentimental Over You" for the bandleader Tommy Dorsey. Bassman also worked in radio as an arranger for Andre Kostelanetz, and made the move to Hollywood in the mid-1930s.

Among his earliest film jobs was orchestrating the Gershwin songs in the Fred Astaire movie A Damsel in Distress at RKO. He later went to work at MGM, where he composed music for the Marx Brothers vehicles A Day at the Races, Go West, and The Big Store, as well as writing or arranging music for such musicals as Lady Be Good and Cabin in the Sky. He also worked on Metro-Goldwyn-Mayer's 1939 musical The Wizard of Oz (for which he orchestrated the background music used in the tornado scene, poppy-field scene and many of the Emerald City sequences), Babes in Arms, and For Me and My Gal. During his work at MGM, he returned to RKO to supervise the adaptation of the Richard Rodgers/Lorenz Hart musical Too Many Girls to the big screen. He also worked on dramas, including Vincente Minnelli's The Clock and Tay Garnett's The Postman Always Rings Twice.

Bassman's career was interrupted in the midst of the Red Scare, however, when he admitted in testimony before the House Un-American Activities Committee that he had been a member of the Communist party (it was virtually a family legacy, his mother apparently having been a dedicated Communist in the 1910s, when it had a very different meaning than it did in the 1950s).

Bassman left Hollywood after the studios closed their doors to him and returned to New York where he found the theater still open to him. He was engaged to orchestrate the show Guys and Dolls (with Ted Royal), and also composed music for various shows and revues. Although Hollywood was closed to him, Bassman was able to work in television in its early days, as a composer for various live shows and also as a conductor; he eventually composed the music for the live television anthology series Producers' Showcase as well. He also quietly kept his hand in movies, where independent producers were willing to hire him. Among his best scores during this period was his music for The Joe Louis Story (1955); he also got hired to write some music for the Hollywood movie Marty (1955), and Columbia hired him in 1958 to score Middle of the Night.

Bassman had seemingly beaten the blacklist, and without too much inconvenience, but then his professional luck ran out, oddly enough upon his return to MGM for the first time in more than a decade. He clashed with the makers (including director Sam Peckinpah) of what could have been a triumphant comeback, on Ride the High Country (1962). He closed out his film career with Mail Order Bride (1964), and saw several of his scores (including one for Bonnie and Clyde) rejected.

In 1961 he arranged all the music for Mitzi Gaynor's very first nightclub act which debuted at The Flamingo Hotel in Las Vegas.

Late in his career, he re-orchestrated the 1922 one-act jazz opera by George Gershwin and Buddy DeSylva, Blue Monday. This version has been recorded.

In the late 1960s, he acquired ownership of and operated the Savoy Club, a contract bridge club located on Sunset Strip catering to Hollywood personalities and local bridge professionals.

== Death ==
Bassman's later life was marred by tragedy—his personal life involved three marriages, and the last had a duration of scarcely a year. By the late 1970s, he was cut loose from his career, and he later fell in with the wrong people. He died forgotten by his profession and alone in Los Angeles in 1997.
