= Howard Schenken =

American bridge player

Howard Schenken (September 28, 1903 – February 20, 1979) was an American bridge player, writer, and long-time syndicated bridge columnist. He was from New York City. He won three Bermuda Bowl titles, and set several North American records. Most remarkably he won the Life Master Pairs five times, the Spingold twelve, and the Vanderbilt Trophy ten times; the LM Pairs and Vanderbilt records that still stand today.

Schenken is ACBL Life Master number 3, dating from 1936. (Note: Schenken and nine others were named Life Masters by the American Bridge League in 1936. The ACBL was established by mergers of competing organizations, completed late in 1937, and it continued the ABL Life Master title and master points program.) He was named to the bridge hall of fame by The Bridge World in 1966, which brought the number of members to nine, all made founding members of the ACBL Hall of Fame in 1995. (Note: The Bridge World monthly magazine, established by Ely Culbertson in 1929, named nine members of its bridge hall of fame including Culbertson from 1964 to 1966, but it never named another. Almost thirty years later, the ACBL established its hall of fame with the Bridge World nine as founding members. It named eight new members in 1995 and has inducted others annually since then.)

== Career ==
Schenken was playing with the Raymond Club team in the late 1920s when he was spotted by the "Father" of the game Ely Culbertson, who invited him to play as a substitute during the much publicized "Bridge Battle of the Century" against Sidney Lenz, which was won by Culbertson's team. In 1932, Schenken formed a partnership with David Burnstine who had left the "Four Horsemen", the most successful team in tournament play at the time. Burnstine created the "Bid-rite Team" consisting initially of himself, Schenken, Richard L. Frey and Charles Lochridge. By 1935, roster changes saw the team comprise Burnstine, Schenken, Oswald Jacoby (from the Four Horsemen) and Michael T. Gottlieb. They became known now as the "Four Aces" and rose to be the most successful team yet seen at contract bridge. They published a book of their methods in 1935, The Four Aces System of Contract Bridge, and tried to challenge Culbertson into another of his much publicized matches, but he declined. Schenken is recognized by the American Contract Bridge League (ACBL) as Life Master #3, one of ten named in 1936 – behind Burnstine and Jacoby.

Beside his brilliant play, Schenken was renowned for his unbreakable calm at the table. As declarer, it was impossible to tell whether he was in a comfortable contract or an impossible one (and his commanding dummy play often made an impossible one). He was a formidably difficult opponent but a remarkably easy partner. On the Four Aces, for example, he was the only one who played with every other member of the team.

The Bermuda Bowl was first held in 1950 and Schenken was on the winning USA team. He also took part in the successful defenses of the trophy in 1951 and 1953, but subsequently played on the US or North America team only on four occasions during the early 1960s. That was during the reign of the Italian Blue Team, which proved unbeatable from 1956 to 1972. Yet one great compliment came from members of the Blue Team who said, "If your team had had another Schenken, we never could have won."

Schenken was an ACBL board member for many years. In 1943 he took over the Four Aces syndicated bridge column and in 1957 merged it with the column by Frey. They wrote it jointly until 1970 when Schenken became the sole author once more; meanwhile it became the longest continuously published national bridge column.

Schenken wrote only three books but they presented some important ideas. (Two focus on bidding; one is a memoir.) He is credited with the discovery and introduction to the tournament world of several play techniques and examples of deceptive play which are now considered standard.

In the field of bidding theory, Schenken is credited with the idea of the forcing two-over-one response, the prepared opening bid, and the weak two bid. (The "weak two" was part of Harold Vanderbilt's Vanderbilt Club system, however.) Schenken also developed his own strong club system, the Schenken Club, played with Peter Leventritt.

Schenken died in Palm Springs, California, at age 75 in 1979.

== Bridge accomplishments ==
=== Honors ===
- ACBL Hall of Fame, 1966

=== Wins ===
- IBL World Championship (1) 1935
- Bermuda Bowl (3) 1950, 1951, 1953
- North American Bridge Championships (34)
  - Vanderbilt (10) 1934, 1935, 1937, 1938, 1946, 1950, 1955, 1956, 1957, 1964
  - Asbury Park Trophy (now Spingold) (2) 1933, 1937
  - Masters Teams-of-Four (now Spingold) (2) 1934, 1936
  - Spingold (8) 1938, 1939, 1943, 1945, 1948, 1950, 1952, 1960
  - Chicago (now Reisinger) (2) 1957, 1963
  - Reisinger (1) 1968
  - Men's Board-a-Match Teams (1) 1949
  - Master Mixed Teams (1) 1935
  - Life Master Pairs (5) 1931, 1933, 1934, 1941, 1943
  - Mixed Pairs (1) 1957
  - Master Individual (1) 1932
- United States Bridge Championships (1)
  - Open Pair Trials (1) 1964

=== Runners-up ===
- Bermuda Bowl (3) 1961, 1963, 1965
- North American Bridge Championships (19)
  - Vanderbilt (9) 1930, 1931, 1932, 1941, 1945, 1952, 1959, 1962, 1967
  - Spingold (3) 1941, 1947, 1955
  - Chicago (now Reisinger) (1) 1950
  - Reisinger (1) 1966
  - Master Mixed Teams (3) 1936, 1958, 1966
  - Life Master Pairs (2) 1932, 1952

== See also ==
- Four Aces

== Publications ==
- Better Bidding in 15 Minutes, Expert Bidding in a Week (Simon & Schuster, 1963)
- Howard Schenken's "Big Club": A revolutionary, highly competitive, and accurate way to bid for every bridge player (S&S, 1968)
- The Education of a Bridge Player (S&S, 1973); London: Robert Hale, 1976

Schenken was a nominal co-author of publications by the Four Aces, or Four Aces Bridge Studio in some catalog records. There were at least two books with mainstream editions.

- Burnstine, David; Jacoby, Oswald; Schenken, Howard; Gottlieb, Michael T. (1935). Four Aces System of Contract Bridge. New York: Random House., 302 pp.
- Five-suit bridge, by the Four Aces (Simon & Schuster, 1938), Burnstine, Jacoby, Merwin D. Maier, Schenken
