= Game of the Year =

Game of the Year may refer to:

- Video Game of the Year – see List of Game of the Year awards
- Board Game of the Year – see List of Game of the Year awards (board games)
