= Edward Sheppard =

English cricketer

Personal information
- Born: 2 March 1891; Bristol, England
- Died: 23 December 1962 (aged 71); Bristol, England
- Batting: Right-handed

Domestic team information
- Years: Team
- 1921-1922: Gloucestershire
- Source: Cricinfo, 26 March 2014

Edward Sheppard (2 March 1891 – 23 December 1962) was an English cricketer. He played for Gloucestershire between 1921 and 1922.
