= Sidney Lenz =

American bridge player

Sidney Samuel Lenz (1873–1960) was an American contract bridge player and writer. He is a member of the American Contract Bridge League Hall of Fame, being inducted in the second (1965) class.

== Career ==
Lenz was born July 12, 1873, in a suburb of Chicago. His parents were John J. and Joanna L. Lenz. The family moved to New York in 1888 (Lenz would have been 14 or 15) but Lenz returned to Chicago before he was 21, and he was soon successful in business, becoming owner of a lumber mill and a paper box factory.

Rich by age 30, he retired from business to devote himself to his many avocations, a principal (but by no means only) one being bridge.

In 1910 Lenz won the American Whist League's principal national team championship. (In his lifetime he won more than 600 whist and bridge competitions; whist is a precursor and close relative of bridge.) He learned auction bridge in 1911 from British Army officers while traveling in India, studying magic and Hindu culture.

He achieved his greatest fame from the so-called "Bridge Battle of the Century", the Culbertson-Lenz match of 1931–32. This match, in the heyday of contract bridge's golden age of popularity, pitted Ely Culbertson (the greatest bridge figure of the age and perhaps of all time) against the Official System championed by Lenz, which Lenz had helped develop. The Official System stood in opposition to Culberson's system, which – laid out in his Contract Bridge Blue Book – was sweeping the bridge world, and the challenge match attracted a mass audience.

Lenz chose emerging great Oswald Jacoby as his teammate. Ely Culbertson mostly played with his wife Josephine Culbertson. Lenz and Jacoby led for 43 rubbers (the match was 150 rubbers), but Jacoby, unhappy with Lenz's play, quit after the 103rd rubber, and Culberson ended up the winner by 8,980. The match was front-page news across the world and widely reported on the radio, sealing Lenz's fame despite his losing. Lenz retired from tournament play shortly after, although he remained active in the bridge world in various capacities.

== Writings and contributions ==
Lenz's 1926 book Lenz on Bridge is considered a classic bridge manual and a work of literary merit.

Lenz tried to introduce a new call, the "challenge", to replace the takeout double but this did not gain favor. His "1-2-3" bidding system ultimately gave way to other systems. He is the namesake of the "Lenz echo", but disclaimed credit for this, saying he had just brought it over from whist. He is credited with coining the term "squeeze play" in the bridge context.

== Other pursuits ==
Lenz was a skilled amateur magician, the first ever to be elected an honorary member of the Society of American Magicians. He was also highly skilled at chess, tennis, golf, bowling, and card games.

He was an associate editor and part owner of the satirical magazine Judge, and wrote short stories for mass circulation magazines (many with a bridge setting).
