= Milton Work =

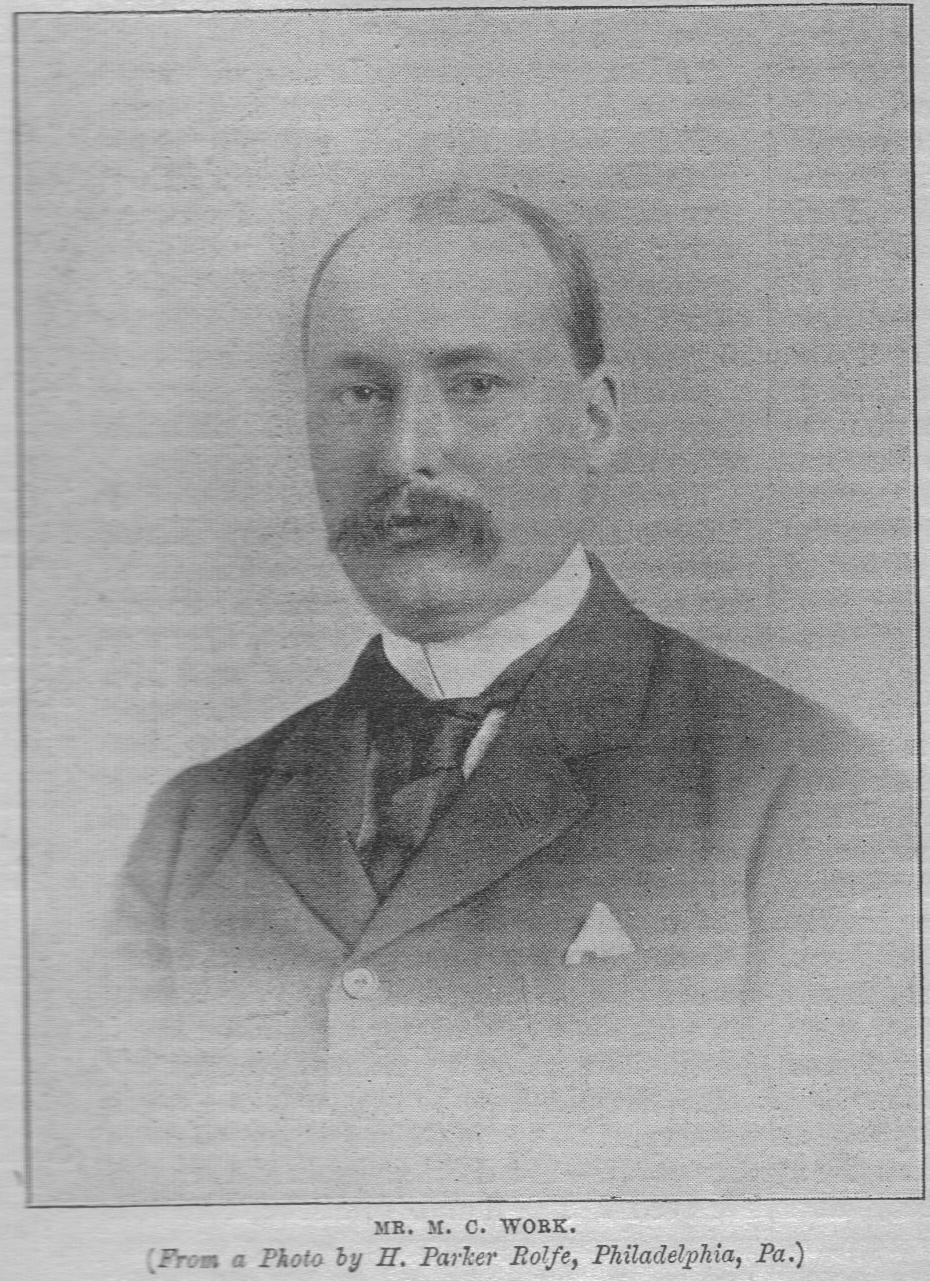
Work in 1897

Milton Cooper Work (September 15, 1864 – June 27, 1934) was an American authority on whist, bridge whist, auction and contract bridge. At least during the 19th century he was a cricket player, writer, and official.

Work, Sidney Lenz, and Oswald Jacoby were named to its bridge hall of fame by The Bridge World monthly magazine in 1965, which brought the number of members to six. They were all made founding members of the ACBL Hall of Fame in 1995. (Note: The Bridge World monthly magazine, established by Ely Culbertson in 1929, named nine members of its bridge hall of fame including Culbertson from 1964 to 1966, but it never named another. Almost thirty years later, the ACBL established its hall of fame with the Bridge World nine as founding members. It named eight new members in 1995 and has inducted others annually since then.)

== Life ==
Work was born in Philadelphia, Pennsylvania, where he graduated from the University of Pennsylvania and practiced law from 1887 to 1917. He and Wilbur C. Whitehead toured the country in 1917 "organizing bridge competitions and lecturing on bridge, to promote the sale of Liberty bonds". The tour was successful enough that he made bridge a full-time occupation rather than return to law.

== Other sporting activities ==
Work was the manager of the Philadelphian cricket team that toured England in 1897. He had earlier played for Belmont Cricket Club between at least 1880 and 1887. He also played cricket, tennis and baseball for the University of Pennsylvania in 1887. He edited the American Cricketer magazine.

In 1897 he was a representative of the Belmont Golf Association at a meeting which founded the Golf Association of Philadelphia.

== Work Point Count system ==
In his writings on bridge during the last seven years of his life, Work adopted Bryant McCampbell's 1915 suggestion for evaluating balanced hands using a point count method: Ace = 4, King = 3, Queen = 2 and Jack = 1. Although Work had strongly opposed point count methods for 25 years (1902–1927), beginning about 1927 he became a strong advocate of the 4-3-2-1-½ point count—so much so that it became known as the Work Point Count. Subsequently, his employee and disciple Charles Goren adapted it to value all hands. It is still used by players today. In 1927 Work was named American Bridge League (ABL) Honorary Member of the Year.

== Selected works ==
- Whist of Today: in two parts, 2nd ed.[?] (Philadelphia: Dreka, 1895), 182 pp. OCLC 30571060

"Also available in digital form on the Internet Archive Web site." LCCN 05-26342

- Auction of To-day, 5th ed.[?] (Houghton-Mifflin Co., 1913), 299 pp. OCLC 5982767
- Auction Under the Laws of 1915 (Philadelphia: John C. Winston Co., 1915), 104 pp.
- Auction Declarations (Winston, 1917), 288 pp.
- Auction Methods Up-to-Date including the new laws of 1920 (Winston, 1920), 332 pp.
- Auction for Two or Three, with a new code of laws for these games (Winston, 1921), 222 pp. – with "appendix giving improved methods for two-handed Canfield and Russian Bank" OCLC 3867409
- Par Auction, analysis of play (Milton Bradley Company, 1921), 59 pp. OCLC 6549918
- Auction Bridge in Twelve Lessons (Milton Bradley, 1922), 270 pp. LCCN 23-125
- Auction Bridge of 1924 (Winston, 1923), 507 pp.
- Mah-jongg ... Up-to-Date (Winston, 1924), 177 pp. – Mahjong
- Auction Bridge Complete (Winston, 1926), 500 pp. OCLC 1577198
- Bridge Pointers and Tests (Winston, 1927), 192 pp.
- Contract Bridge (Winston, 1927) 143 pp. – "including the official laws of contract bridge adopted by the Whist club, New York and by the Racquet and Tennis club, New York" OCLC 2617005
- Auction Bridge for Beginners (Winston, 1928), 136 pp.
- Contract Bridge For All (Winston, 1929), 243 pp.
- Lesson hands for use of bridge teachers of the common sense system (Winston, 1930), 25 pp. LCCN 30-16947
- Common Sense Contract Bridge (Winston, 1931), 369 pp. LCCN 31-1060
- The Gist of Contract Bridge (Winston, 1931), 56 pp. OCLC 26064152
- The official system of contract bridge in a nutshell (Winston, 1931), 58 pp. LCCN 31-35688
- Milton C. Work's short-cut to contract official system (A. G. Spalding Bros., 1931), 183 pp. LCCN 32-1436
- The official summary of the new standardized official system of contract bridge (Winston, 1933), 83 pp. LCCN 33-8799
- One hundred and one celebrated hands in contract bridge, bid and played, eds. Work and Olive Avery Peterson (Winston, 1933), 215 pp. OCLC 16727481
- The Work–Peterson accurate valuation system of contract bridge, Work and Peterson (Winston, 1934), 101 pp. OCLC 3344065

Periodicals

- Auction Bridge and Mah Jong Magazine, eds. Work and Wilbur C. Whitehead (NY: John H. Smith Pub, 1924) LCCN 25-21970
- Auction Bridge Magazine, Work and Whitehead (J. H. Smith, 1924–1929) LCCN 33-22385

== Sources ==
- Cricket profile
- Wisden Cricketer's Almanack, 1935 edition, Obituaries section
