= Walter Herbert (conductor) =

American conductor and impresario of German birth (1898–1975)

Walter Herbert (né Seligmann; February 18, 1898 – September 14, 1975) was an American conductor and impresario of German birth, and also a world champion at contract bridge. He founded both the Houston Grand Opera and the San Diego Opera.

== Operatic career ==
He was born Walter Seligmann in Frankfurt, and studied composition under Arnold Schoenberg in Vienna. He gained experience as conductor in Germany and Switzerland, and was later appointed chief conductor at the Vienna Volksoper (1931–38). His operatic debut was with Carmen, at the Stadttheater Bern in 1925. Shortly before the 1938 Anschluss of Germany and Austria, Herbert visited Japan to introduce modern Western classical music to that country. From there he migrated to the United States, and became an American citizen in 1944.

Herbert was director of Opera in English (San Francisco, 1940–43); and in 1943 was appointed the first general director of the New Orleans Opera Association, which post he held until 1954. He founded the Houston Grand Opera in 1955, where he remained as both general director and conductor until 1972; and was music director of Opera/South (founded by Sister M. Elise Sisson, SBS) in Jackson, Mississippi. He founded the San Diego Opera in 1965, and was its general director and conductor from 1969 until his death.

Herbert worked with most of the great singers of his day, and gave many of them their start in the opera world. In April 1948, during Herbert's regime in New Orleans, the young Mario Lanza made one of his very few operatic stage appearances, as Lieutenant Pinkerton in Madama Butterfly; under Herbert's baton and Armando Agnini's stage direction. (It was announced in May 1948 that Lanza had accepted the role of Alfredo Germont, in the New Orleans Opera's La traviata; but Hollywood apparently interfered with those plans.)

== Bridge player ==
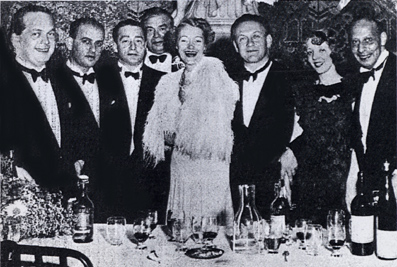
The winning Austrian team at the 1937 World Championships: from left, Karl Schneider, Hans Jellinek, Edouard Frischauer, Paul Stern (Capt.), Josephine Culbertson (US), Walter Herbert, Helen Sobel (US), and Karl von Bluhdorn

At the bridge table in the 1930s, Herbert was one member of the Austria national team led by Paul Stern. The team won four of the first six European teams championships, with Herbert playing in 1933 and 1937. The 1937 field included two teams from the United States and doubled as the first world championship tournament.

The Herbert Negative is a bridge convention advocated by Walter Herbert, based on the idea that a negative response in a variety of situations can be made by making the cheapest possible suit response, e.g. as a response to a forcing two-bid.

== Discography ==
- Verdi: Un ballo in maschera (S.Morris, Schuh, Larrimore, Björling, Rothmüller, Treigle; 1950) [live] VAI
- Verdi: Rigoletto (Güden, Conley, Warren, Wilderman, Treigle; 1952) [live] VAI
- Verdi: La forza del destino (Milanov, Turner, del Monaco, Warren, Treigle; 1953) [live] VAI
- Ponchielli: La Gioconda: excerpts (Milanov, Turner, Madeira, Turrini, Bardelli, Moscona; 1953) [live] VAI
