= Hubert Phillips =

British economist and writer

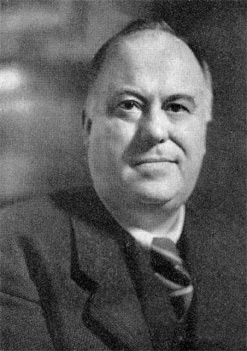
Phillips

Hubert Phillips (13 December 1891 – 9 January 1964) was a British economist, journalist, broadcaster, bridge player and organiser, composer of puzzles and quizzes, and the author of some 70 books.

== Life ==
=== Education and early career ===
Phillips was educated at Sexey's School, Bruton, and Merton College, Oxford, where he read History and Economics, taking a first class degree. He served in the British Army with the Essex Regiment throughout World War I.

After the war, he became Head of the Department of Economics at Bristol University and Head of Extra-Mural Studies 1919–24; he was Director, Liberal Research Dept 1924; Economic Adviser and Secretary, Liberal Industrial Inquiry 1924–28; and adviser to the Parliamentary Liberal Party 1926-8. He stood as a Liberal Party candidate in 1929 at Wallasey. He joined the News Chronicle in 1930.

=== Later career ===
Phillips' later career was as a journalist, broadcaster, freelance author, and organiser.

Phillips was the founder (1932) and editor (1936–39) of the British Bridge World, and a pioneer of bridge organisation in England. He was the first chairman of the English Bridge Union in 1936. He was a key person in setting up the first Anglo-American match (Buller v Culbertson). He was the devisor and co-presenter of the first ever bridge programmes on television, BBC 1936. These were programs which involved discussion of pre-selected hands, displayed on boards, followed by their bidding and play by expert pairs. Some of the hands were taken from famous matches, others were devised by Phillips. After play, comparison might be made, for example, with the play on the same hand in the Beasley–Culbertson match. The series was thought to be a great success, though of course viewership was limited in those days.

As an author (the greater part of his income) he wrote on bridge, and on general knowledge, intellectual, mathematical and bridge puzzles and quizzes. Chess, he said, was his favourite game, but he wrote little on that subject. He wrote over 100 crime stories. He composed thousands of puzzles, both mathematical and inferential, and about 6000 crosswords. He wrote on bridge for the News Chronicle as 'Nine-spot', as well as being (by his own testimony) the chief leader writer for the paper for several years during World War II. He also contributed to The Nation and The New Statesman as 'Caliban'. He was the editor of the London early editions of Ely Culbertson's Contract Bridge Blue Book. He broadcast regularly on BBC radio – on Transatlantic Quiz and its offshoot Round Britain Quiz and later, on occasion, The Brains Trust. In his heyday he earned a five-figure income; but in later years a fondness for drink and gaming led to a decline in his fortunes.

Phillips as a bridge writer and as an organiser was always in competition with A.E. Manning Foster, who had been a professional player since the days of auction bridge, and was the bridge correspondent of The Times. Each of them founded a magazine (Foster's was the Bridge Magazine) and a duplicate bridge organisation (Phillips' was the National Bridge Association, founded 1933). It was not until after WWII that the two organisations were unified. He helped Terence Reese on his first steps to becoming a professional contract bridge player, and co-authored several books with him.

Phillips donated the Hubert Phillips Bowl for the English Mixed Teams Championship. This competition has been played annually since 1937, with the exception of 1939–46, and is the only major event in the country played with aggregate scoring.

=== Opinions of colleagues ===
"For many years Phillips was internationally the most eminent author of intellectual and mathematical puzzles under the name "Caliban" and "Dogberry", and of cryptic crosswords."

"He never lost his courtesy and good humour... he had a largeness of spirit that one seldom sees in this game or indeed in these times."

"Oh, yes, bridge players owe a lot to Hubert Phillips, particularly in the South [of England] where he organised and founded the English Bridge Union and the Duplicate Bridge Control Board." H. St John Ingram

=== Personal life ===
Phillips was married twice: in 1919, to Margery Davies, who died in 1959, with whom he had a son, John, who died in 1961; and in 1961 to Madeleine Bartlett.

== Selected works ==
=== Bridge ===
- Ely Culbertson, edited by Hubert Phillips 1932. Contract Bridge Blue Book. Faber and Faber. London.
- Ely Culbertson, Foreword by Hubert Phillips 1933. Britain v. America: Contract Bridge Championship of 1933. News Chronicle Publications Department. London.
- Ely Culbertson, edited by Hubert Phillips 1933. Contract Bridge For Auction Players. Faber and Faber. London.
- Harold Thorne, Fourth edition revised and enlarged by "Petronius" (Hubert Phillips), 1939. Thorne's Complete Contract Bridge. Eyre & Spottiswoode, London.
- Aileen McCabe, Foreword by Hubert Phillips, 1933. Contract Without Tears. Faber and Faber. London.
- Jordanis Pavlides, Foreword by M. Kissa and Hubert Phillips, One-Page Guide to Bidding. Games Publishers Ltd. London.
- Phillips, Hubert 1951. Bridge at Ruff's Club. edited by Terence Reese. Batchworth. London
- Phillips, Hubert 1959. Bridge is Only a Game. Parrish, London. Illustrated by Pearl Falconer
- Phillips, Hubert 1960. Bridge with Goren. Citadel Press. New York. Contributions by Charles Goren.
- Phillips, Hubert 1939. Brush up Your Bridge. Dent, London. Illustrated by Ward.
- Phillips, Hubert 1962. Making Bridge Pay: how to win at rubber bridge. Parrish, London.
- Phillips, Hubert 1932. One Hundred Contract Bridge Hands. Faber and Faber. London.
- Phillips, Hubert 1934. You Can Play and Laugh. Faber, London.
- Phillips, Hubert and Terence Reese 1952. Bridge with Mr Playbetter. Batchworth. London
- Phillips, Hubert and Terence Reese 1937. The Elements of Contract. British Bridge World. London. Edition 1.
- Phillips, Hubert and Terence Reese 1948. The Elements of Contract. Eyre and Spottiswoodie. London. Edition 2.
- Phillips, Hubert and Terence Reese 1945. How to Play Bridge. Penguin. London.
- Phillips, Hubert and Bernard Westall 1934. Two Hundred Hands from Match Play: an annotated case-book for contract bridge. De La Rue; Faber and Faber. London.

=== Other subjects ===
- Phillips, Hubert 1921. The development of a residential qualification for representatives in colonial legislatures. Abingdon, Cincinnati, OH. [developed as a Columbia University doctoral dissertation]
- Phillips, Hubert, Shovelton S.T. & Marshall G.S. 1933. Caliban's problem book: mathematical, inferential and cryptographic puzzles. De La Rue, London.
- Phillips, Hubert 1936. Brush Up Your Wits. J M Dent, London.
- Phillips, Hubert 1941. Charteris Royal. Gollancz, London. [a thriller]
- Phillips, Hubert and Westall B.C. 1945. The complete book of card games. Witherby, London.
- Phillips, Hubert 1945. Ask Me Another. Penguin (Ptarmigan Books No. 1). Illustrated by Pearl Falconer. A general knowledge quiz book.
- Phillips, Hubert 1945. Something to think about. Penguin (Ptarmigan Books No. 2), Harmondsworth. Illustrated by Pearl Falconer. A book of logical and mathematical puzzles that sold over 100,000 copies.
- Phillips, Hubert 1945. Word play. Penguin, Harmondsworth.
- Phillips, Hubert 1948. Who wrote that? Penguin, Harmondsworth.
- Phillips, Hubert 1947. Chipwinkle: 100 Crosswords with solutions. Penguin, Harmondsworth. [X-words are by Phillips; book includes a spoof biography of 'Eugene Chipwinkle']
- Phillips, Hubert and Falconer, Pearl (1949). Meet William Shakespeare. Cornleaf, London.
- Phillips, Hubert 1950. Round Britain Quiz. Hamilton, London.
- Phillips, Hubert 1951. The Hubert Phillips Annual 1951. [a compendium of puzzles and quizzes]
- Phillips, Hubert 1958. The Penguin Hoyle: a book of indoor games. Penguin, C.
- Golombek, H. and Hubert Phillips 1959. Chess. Witherby.
- Phillips, Hubert 1960. The Pan book of card games. Pan, London.
- Phillips, Hubert 1960. 100 Crossword puzzles (the Hubert Phillips Crossword puzzle book). Penguin, Harmondsworth.
- Phillips, Hubert 1960. Profitable poker: the mathematics and psychology of playing a winning game. Arco, NY.
- Phillips, Hubert 1960. Journey to nowhere. MacGibbon & Kee, London. [a discursive autobiography, which concentrates on his early days]
- Phillips, Hubert 1961. My best puzzles in logic and reasoning. Dover, NY.
- Phillips, Hubert 1961. My best puzzles in mathematics. Dover, NY.
- Phillips, Hubert 1992. Mathematische puzzles: Homo ludens. Munich.
