= Josephine Culbertson =

American bridge expert

Josephine M. "Jo" Culbertson (née Murphy; 2 February 1898 – March 23, 1956) was an American bridge player, teacher, theorist and writer.

Josephine Murphy was born in Bayside, New York (now in Queens), to parents John Edward Murphy and Sarah McCarthy Murphy. She worked as secretary to the auction bridge authority Wilbur C. Whitehead in the early 1920s and married Ely Culbertson in 1923 (divorced 1938). The Culbertsons developed and taught the Approach–Forcing system of bidding at auction and later at contract bridge, and founded The Bridge World magazine in 1929.

Some time later her name was Josephine Murphy Dillon.

Culbertson was inducted into the ACBL Hall of Fame in 1996.

== Bridge accomplishments ==
=== Honors ===
- ACBL Hall of Fame, 1996

=== Wins ===
- North American Bridge Championships (2)
  - Vanderbilt (1) 1930
  - Spingold (1) 1930

=== Runners-up ===
- North American Bridge Championships
  - von Zedtwitz Life Master Pairs (1) 1930
  - Whitehead Women's Pairs (1) 1930
  - Fall National Open Pairs (1) 1928
  - Spingold (1) 1934
  - Reisinger (1) 1935
