= Ely Culbertson =

American contract bridge entrepreneur (1891–1955)

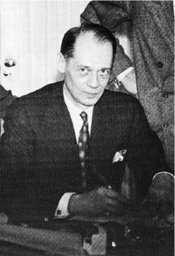
- Culbertson, from a photo used in one of his 1930s bridge books
- Born: Elie Almon Culbertson; July 22, 1891; Poiana Vărbilău, Romania
- Died: December 27, 1955 (aged 64); Brattleboro, Vermont, USA
- Occupations: Contract bridge writer, publisher, organizer and player; advocate of world peace
- Spouses: Josephine Culbertson (m. 1923; div. 1938): Dorothy Renata Baehne
- Children: 4

Elie Almon Culbertson (July 22, 1891 – December 27, 1955), known as Ely Culbertson, was an American contract bridge entrepreneur and personality dominant during the 1930s. He played a major role in the popularization of the new game and was widely regarded as "the man who made contract bridge". He was a great showman who became rich, was highly extravagant, and lost and gained fortunes several times over.

== Life ==
Culbertson was born in Poiana Vărbilău in Romania to an American mining engineer, Almon Culbertson, and his Russian wife, Xenya Rogoznaya. He attended the École des sciences économiques et politiques at the Sorbonne in Paris, and the University of Geneva. His facility for languages was extraordinary: he spoke Russian, English, French, German, Czech and Spanish fluently, with a reading knowledge of five others, and a knowledge of Latin and classical Greek. In spite of his education, his erudition was largely self-acquired: he was a born autodidact.

After the Russian Revolution (1917), Culbertson lived for four years in Paris and other European cities by exploiting his skill as a card player. In 1921 he moved to the United States, earning his living from winnings at auction bridge and poker. In 1923 he married Josephine Murphy, a successful teacher of auction bridge and a leading player, in Manhattan. They were successful as both players and teachers, and later as publishers. Josephine Culbertson retained the surname after their divorce in 1938; indeed, a revised edition of Culbertson's Contract Bridge in Ten Minutes was published under her name in 1951.

As contract bridge began to supplant auction bridge, Culbertson pursued a campaign to establish himself as a leading figure in the new game. As a player, organizer, bidding theorist, magazine editor, and team leader, he played a central role in the growth of contract bridge during the 1930s.

Culbertson was a brilliant publicist; he played several famous challenge matches and won them all. Two were played in the U.S., against pairs led by Sidney Lenz in 1931–32 (the so-called "Bridge Battle of the Century") and by P. Hal Sims in 1935, the latter between the married couples Culbertson and Sims. Four teams-of-four matches were played in England, against Walter Buller's team in 1930, against "Pops" Beasley's team in 1930 and 1933, and against Col. George Walshe's team in 1934. These matches were typically accompanied by noteworthy publicity in newspapers, on radio and on cinema newsreels, and the hands became the subject of intense discussion on bidding methods.

Later, Culbertson managed to adroitly avoid playing the leading American team of the mid-1930s, the "Four Aces". Culbertson was defeated again in Budapest, June 1937, in the first world championship teams tournament, by the Austria team led by Dr. Paul Stern. It was his last appearance in a tournament or match. He never lost again, because he never played again.

Culbertson founded and edited The Bridge World magazine, which is still published today, and wrote many newspaper articles and books on bridge. He owned the first firm of playing card manufacturers to develop plastic cards, Kem Cards, and developed and owned a chain of bridge schools with teachers qualified in the Culbertson bidding system. He continued to play high-stakes rubber bridge for many years, but gave up tournament and match competition in 1938 to write and to work for world peace. Total Peace (1943) and Must We Fight Russia? (1947) were his most important books.

== Challenge matches ==
These matches received great publicity, being extensively covered in the newspapers, often making the front pages. By winning them, Culbertson suggested to the bridge-playing public that the Culbertson System of bidding was superior to the systems of his rivals, and thereby boosted the sales of his books. But according to his team-mate Theodore Lightner: "Ely's real advantage was that his team was much stronger than anything others could possibly muster, We could have played different systems and won just as easily."

=== Culbertson–Lenz match ===
This pairs match took place during December 1931 and January 1932 at two New York City hotels, and was called the "Bridge Battle of the Century". Sidney Lenz was the leader of a group of players opposed to Culbertson's domination of the game, and who called their bidding system the Official System. Culbertson challenged Lenz to a match, wagering $5,000 against his opponent's $1,000, with the money to go to charity regardless of the outcome.

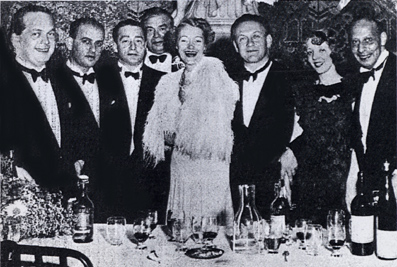
The winning Austrian team at the 1937 World Championships: from left, Karl Schneider, Hans Jellinek, Edouard Frischauer, Paul Stern (Capt.), Josephine Culbertson (US), Walter Herbert, Helen Sobel (US), and Karl von Blöhdorn

The match was played as rubber bridge, with 150 rubbers being played. Culbertson played 88 of these with his wife, Josephine, partnering one of Theodore Lightner, Waldemar von Zedtwitz, Howard Schenken and Michael T. Gottlieb in the remainder. Lenz played with Oswald Jacoby for the first 103 rubbers, but Jacoby then resigned following a heated difference of opinion over a defensive play.

According to the match referee, Lt. Alfred Gruenther (later 4-star General and Supreme Allied Commander Europe 1953-56), Jacoby said following that deal, "I made a play that only twelve players in the country would understand, and unfortunately Mr Lenz did not seem, at that particular moment, to be among that twelve." Cmdr. Winfield Liggett, Jr., was Lenz's partner for the rest of the match, which Culbertson won by 8,980 points.

Terence Reese said "The Official System (Lenz) ... was discredited ... That the Culbertsons did not win more easily (for their constructive bidding was much better than that of their opponents) was due to the fact that Jacoby was a player of quite different class from any of the others." Jacoby's psychic bids and his competitive bidding generally kept the Lenz team in the match; but Lenz himself could not tolerate Jacoby's style.

=== Anglo-American matches ===
Lt. Col. Walter Buller promoted a bidding system that he called "British Bridge", which used direct methods and avoided approach forcing bids as had been incorporated in the Culbertson System. His challenge was accepted by Culbertson, and a teams of four match took place in London in 1930. The Culbertson team won by 4,845 total points over 200 deals. Culbertson partnered his wife, Josephine, and his other pair comprised Lightner and von Zedtwitz. Later in the match Culbertson played with Lightner, and his wife played with von Zedwitz: this was the more successful line-up. The other three members of Buller's team were Alice Evers, Cedric Kehoe and Nelson Wood-Hill.

Immediately after the Buller match, the Culbertson team played another match, against Crockford's Club. The Crockford's team was 'Pops' Beasley (Captain), Sir Guy Domville, George Morris and Captain Hogg; the match over 200 boards was won by Culbertson by 4,905 points (total points scoring).

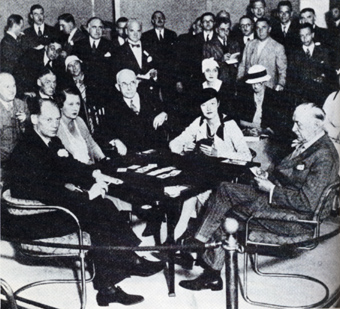
Match for the Schwab Cup, 1933. At table, from left: E. Culbertson, Lady Doris Rhodes, referee Col. GGJ Walshe, J. Culbertson, Pops Beasley. Behind, far left: Hubert Phillips.

The matches in 1933 and 1934 both took place for the Schwab Cup, a trophy presented for Anglo-American matches by Charles Schwab, an American industrialist and patron of bridge, who was president of the Whist Club of New York. In 1933, Michael Gottlieb replaced von Zedtwitz in the Culbertson team. The British team consisted of Lt. Col. 'Pops' Beasley and Sir Guy Domville, Percy Tabbush and George Morris, Graham Mathieson and Lady Doris Rhodes (pairs were sometimes aligned differently). The Culbertson team won by 10,900 total points over 300 hands, a decisive but not overwhelming victory.

The following year, again in London, the Schwab trophy pitted the Culbertson team for the first time against a team with "two very experienced partnerships" [Reese] captained by Col. George Walshe. The American team consisted of the Culbertsons, Teddy Lightner and Albert Morehead. The British team was Richard Lederer and Willie Rose; Harry Ingram and Stanley Hughes, with captain Walshe and A. Frost as reserves. Culbertson's team won by 3,650 points over 300 deals. At one time the British team had built up a lead of over 5,000 points, and the Americans led by only 970 points with one session, of 30 deals, remaining. The Lederer–Rose pair tired but refused to take a rest; the last set was a disaster. Ingram referred to the element of fatigue when he remarked that at least three of the English players had done a day's work before the evening sessions, while the Americans did not get up until lunchtime. All the same, Walshe's team had shown that the great Culbertson team was vulnerable. They were eventually beaten by Dr. Paul Stern's Austrian team, the best European team of the 1930s.

Anglo-American matches after World War II, of which there were a number, did not involve Culbertson.

== Bridge accomplishments ==
=== Honors ===
In 1964 The Bridge World honored Harold S. Vanderbilt, Culbertson, and Charles Goren as the first three members of a bridge hall of fame. It increased the number to nine during the next two years and all were made founding members of the ACBL Hall of Fame in 1995.

- ACBL Hall of Fame, 1964
- ACBL Honorary Member of the Year 1938

=== Wins ===
- North American Bridge Championships (3)
  - Vanderbilt (1) 1930
  - Asbury Park Trophy (now Spingold) (1) 1930
  - Chicago (now Reisinger) (1) 1930
- Other notable wins:
  - Schwab Cup (2) 1933, 1934

=== Runners-up ===
- IBL World Championship (1) 1937
- North American Bridge Championships (4)
  - Chicago (now Reisinger) (2) 1932, 1935
  - Life Master Pairs (1) 1930
  - Fall National Open Pairs (1) 1928

== Publications ==
- Contract Bridge Blue Book (1930)
- 300 contract bridge hands (1933) – from the match vs. Beasley for Schwab Cup
- Contract Bridge Red Book on Play (1934)
- Contract bridge complete: the Gold Book of bidding and play (1936)
- Jo-Jotte: How to Play and Win (1937)
- The Strange Lives of One Man (1940)
- The World Federation Plan (1942)
- Total Peace (1943)
- Culbertson System of Playing Gin Rummy (1944)
- Must We Fight Russia? (1946)
- Culbertson on Canasta: a Complete Guide for Beginners and Advanced Players With the Official Laws of Canasta (1949)
- Culbertson System of Canasta (1951)
