= Auction bridge =

Card game of the trick-taking family

Auction Bridge
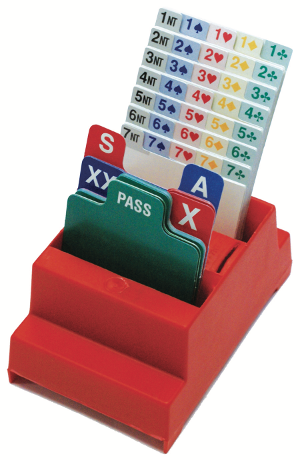
- Bidding box containing all possible calls a player can make in the auction
- Origin: England
- Type: Trick-taking
- Players: 3-4
- Skills: Tactics and Strategy
- Cards: 52-card
- Deck: Anglo-American
- Rank (high→low): A K Q J 10 9 8 7 6 5 4 3 2
- Play: Clockwise
- Playing time: 25 min.
- Chance: Low to Moderate

Related games
- Whist, Contract Bridge

Auction bridge was the first form of bridge in which players bid to declare a contract in their chosen trump suit or no trumps. It was first recorded as being played in Bath around 1904. The Bath Club and Portland Club met in 1908 and issued a super-set of rules for Bridge that covered the bidding and penalty for failing to make a contract in Auction Bridge. Early forms were rudimentary and unbalanced and the British and Americans could not agree over the bidding ranking and use of artificial bids, resulting in The Whist Club of New York and The Portland Club issuing competing sets of rules.

By the 1920s, "Royal Auction Bridge with the New Count" had fixed most of the problems. After books on the new game were published by leading Bridge authors it quickly became popular and replaced what remained of Whist and earlier forms of Bridge. It also replaced 500 in much of the US after that game died out around 1920.

In 1925, aboard the SS Finland, Harold Vanderbilt play tested his version of Contract Bridge, which used the same rules as Auction Bridge for the bidding and play but featured completely new scoring tables. After quickly becoming popular in Southampton and Newport, Vanderbilt's Contract Bridge was adopted by the Whist Club Of New York in 1927 and the Portland Club in 1929; by the end of 1929 it was the only bridge game being played in the clubs of New York and London.

Now known as just Auction Bridge, the game continued to be played socially for many decades.

== History ==
It is not certain to whom auction bridge should be credited. A letter in The Times (London), January 16, 1905, signed by Oswald Crawfurd, describes auction bridge as first played in 1904.

Bidding was not common in England, though it had been used in Dummy Whist, Quadrille, Solo Whist, and Five Hundred.

A book by "John Doe" (Francis Reginald Roe), published in Allahabad, India, in 1899, puts forward auction bridge as an invention of three members of the Indian Civil Service stationed at an isolated community, designed as a three-handed form of bridge to compensate the lack of a fourth player. Their key contribution was the concept of competitive bidding for the declaration.

In the earlier superseded Auction Bridge rules, the dealer opens the bidding and must declare to win at least the odd trick in a trump suit or at notrump. The penalty for a 1S opening was capped at -100, even if it went 7 off doubled.

In UK Auction Bridge, as it was a gambling game, bids were ranked by point value of the contract then level. So, 1♥ (8 points) beats 3♠ (6 points) but 4♠ (8 points) beats 1♥ (8 points) because it is a higher level. This meant an overbid could not reduce the value of the contract at stake. Conversely, Americans ranked bids by level and then suit, as in modern Contract Bridge.

During World War I a variant called Plafond (ceiling) was created in France by adding the idea of a "contract", wherein only tricks bid and made counted towards Game or Slam, while overtricks were bonuses scored above the line. Plafond was successful in France and parts of Canada, particularly among expert players, because accurate high-level bidding was rewarded. It was played by Vanderbilt, but Plafond failed to gain acceptance in New York.

== Play ==
The bidding and play are the same as Contract Bridge.

== Scoring ==
Auction Bridge New Count scoring is as follows:

Tricks (below the line)

- Each trick made over six scores:
  - No-trump: 10 points
  - Spades: 9 points
  - Hearts: 8 points
  - Diamonds: 7 points
  - Clubs: 6 points
- Game is 30 points, and only odd-tricks count towards game or slam.

Bonuses (above the line)

- The first side to win two games ends the rubber and scores a 250-point bonus.
- Each under-trick is worth 50 points to the opponents.
- Small slam is worth 50 points; grand slam is worth 100 points.
- Honours are scored as follows:
  - Four trump honours in one hand: 80
  - Five trump honours (or four aces in No Trump) in one hand: 100
  - Additional honour in partner's hand, or for three plus between both hands: 10 each

Doubles

- A doubled contract scores double the normal score. Additionally when a doubled contract is made there is 50 point bonus for the insult and 50 points per over-trick.
- A redoubled contract scores double the doubled score.

== See also ==
- Russian whist
