= Glossary of contract bridge terms =

These terms are used in contract bridge, using duplicate or rubber scoring. Some of them are also used in whist, bid whist, the obsolete game auction bridge, and other trick-taking games. This glossary supplements the Glossary of card game terms.

In the following entries, boldface links are external to the glossary and plain links reference other glossary entries.

== 0–9 ==
3014 or 3014 RKCB
A mnemonic for the original (Roman) response structure to the Roman Key Card Blackwood convention. It represents "3 or 0" and "1 or 4", meaning that the lowest step response (5♣) to the 4NT key card asking bid shows responder has three or zero keycards and the next step (5♦) shows one or four.
1430 or 1430 RKCB
A mnemonic for a variant response structure to the Roman Key Card Blackwood convention. It represents "1 or 4" and "3 or 0", meaning that the lowest step response (5♣) to the 4NT key card asking bid shows responder has one or four keycards and the next step (5♦) shows three or zero.
1RF
One round force.
2-under preempts
A 2 or 3-level conventional opening bid made two steps below the opener's suit: for example, 2♦ to show a weak two bid in spades or 3♣ to show a three-level preempt in hearts. If 2♣ is a strong, artificial force, 2♥ is natural.
4SF
Fourth suit forcing.
8421
Counting points by way of 8421 means counting an ace for 8 points, a king for 4, a queen for 2, and a jack for 1 point. For example, when a bid is interpreted as "5- 8421 HCP in S", this means the bidder is expected to have 5 or fewer points in spades, counting an ace as 8 points, etc.

== A ==
Rubber Bridge Scoring

Above the line
In rubber bridge, the location on the scorepad above the main horizontal line where extra points are entered; extra points are those awarded for holding honor cards in trumps, for bonuses for scoring game, small slam, grand slam or winning a rubber, for overtricks on the declaring side and for undertricks on the defending side and for fulfilling doubled or redoubled contracts. Points awarded for contract odd tricks bid and made are entered below the line. See Bridge scoring.
ACBL
American Contract Bridge League, the sport governing body for bridge in North America – defined as Bermuda, Canada, Mexico, and the United States – and the sponsoring organization of North American Bridge Championships (NABC). Its members are players, grouped in regional districts and local units for some purposes. Contrast USBF.
Acol
An approach–forcing, natural bidding system, based on a weak NT and 4-card majors, popular in the United Kingdom and the Commonwealth.
Active

1. An approach to defending a hand that emphasizes quickly setting up winners and taking tricks. Contrast Passive.
2. An approach to competitive bidding that emphasizes frequent interference with opponents' bidding sequences.

Adjusted score
In duplicate bridge, a score awarded by the Director (when empowered by the Laws) in order to redress damage to a non-offending side and to take away any advantage gained by an offending side through an infraction. It may be "assigned" (weighted to reflect the probabilities of a number of potential results) or "artificial" (otherwise). The scores awarded to the two sides need not balance.
Advance cue bid
The cue bid of a first round control that occurs before a partnership has agreed on a strain.
Advance sacrifice
A sacrifice bid made before the opponents have had an opportunity to determine their optimum contract. For example: 1♦ – (1♠) – Dbl – (5♠).
Advancer
Overcaller's partner, especially one who bids following the overcall.
Adverse vulnerability
Vulnerable against non-vulnerable opponents. Also called "unfavorable vulnerability".
Aggregate scoring
Deciding the outcome of a contest by totaling the raw points gained or lost on each deal. Also called "total point scoring".
Agree
For a partnership to come to a decision, explicitly, conventionally or by implication, on the denomination in which to play a hand.
Agreement
An understanding between partners as to the meaning of a particular call or defensive play. There are two types of call agreements: (1) when the call is natural, the agreement is said to be a treatment, and (2) when the call is artificial, the agreement is said to be a convention.
Air, as "on air"

	♥ K Q 5 4	
♥ A 7 6 2	**W N↑ S↓ E**	♥ J 10 9 3
	♥ 8	

(Slang) To win a trick with a high card while capturing only small cards, commonly said of a defensive play. In the example at right, when South leads the ♥8, West must take the ♥A on air, or risk making no heart tricks. Nevertheless, best defense on a given hand may call either for ducking the winner or for playing it on air.
Alcatraz coup
Declarer's intentional and unethical attempt to locate a finessable card by revoking. If the play is unintentional, it is nevertheless subject to score adjustment.
Alert
A method of informing the opponents that partner's call carries a meaning they might not expect. Sponsoring organizations set rules on which calls must be alerted and how; any method of alerting may be authorized, such as saying "Alert", displaying an Alert card from a bidding box, or knocking on the table. Regardless whether a call is alerted, either opponent may ask its meaning, either at his/her turn or after the end of the auction. The player who made the call may contribute to its explanation only after the auction and only if he/she is declarer or dummy. Slightly different rules apply when screens are in use.
Announcement
A method of promptly informing the opponents that partner's call has a particular meaning. The purposes of announcements and alerts are similar, but an announcement gives the meaning where an alert may prompt the opponents to ask the meaning. Sponsoring organizations set rules on which calls should be announced. The ACBL specifies announcements including "Transfer" for some transfer replies to notrump bids, the point range such as "15 to 17" for an opening bid of one notrump, and "Forcing" or "Semi-forcing" for a 1NT response to a major suit opening bid.
Antipositional
A call is antipositional if it tends to make the "wrong" partner the declarer. If West opens the bidding, it may be best for South to declare a North-South contract, so that West will have to play from his high cards on opening lead. This positioning may protect South's tenaces. In that case, a call that will make North declarer is antipositional. See wrongside.
Appeal
In tournaments, to appeal is to request that a committee review a ruling made by a director.
Approach–forcing
A principle, first used in the Culbertson system, that has survived in modern bidding. The original idea was to abandon the indiscriminate notrump bids that characterized auction bridge in favor of a slower exchange of information via suit bidding.
Arrow
A marker, usually a large card with an arrow on it, that shows which direction is treated as North at a table in a duplicate event.
Arrow switch
The action of changing the North direction during an event, typically for the last round of a Mitchell movement, so that the pairs who were North-South become East-West and vice versa. This allows a single winning pair to be determined.
Artificial

1. A call that is not natural which by agreement carries a coded meaning not necessarily related to the call's (or to the prior call's) denomination.
2. A bidding system that contains many such calls.

Asking bid
A bid that, by prior agreement, requests information about a feature of partner's hand: for example, number of controls, suit length, or control of a particular suit.
Attacking lead
A lead that instigates an active defense; often, the lead of an honor from a sequence, or a forcing defense.
Attitude
A defender's desire, or lack thereof, for his side to continue playing a suit. By means of signals, defender encourages or discourages the continuation of the suit.
Auction

1. See bidding.
2. **Auction bridge**, an earlier form of bridge, differing from today's **contract bridge** chiefly in the scoring. Most notably, overtricks counted the same as tricks bid and made, so they were scored below the line and any contract, no matter how low, could produce a game or slam bonus.

Austrian System
Another name for Vienna System.

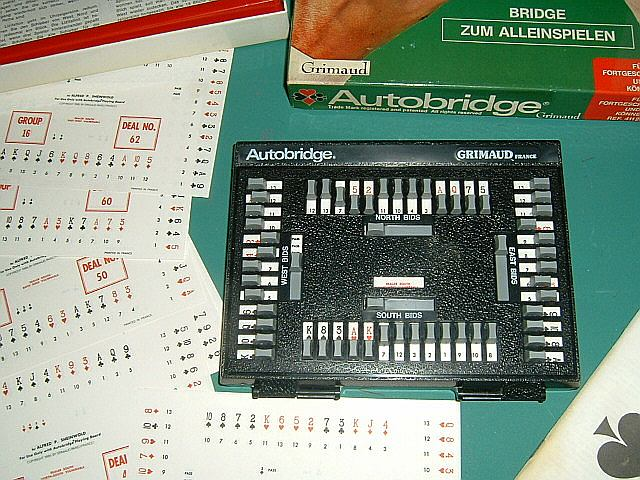
Autobridge, a device for learning bridge

Autobridge
A variant of contract bridge for play by one person; alternatively, a means for one to learn or practice the game alone. Information for each deal is pre-printed on one sheet of paper in a special layout. Such a "deal" is loaded in a mechanical template (see image at right) which the operator-player manipulates selectively and sequentially to reveal some of the information. Paper deals are distributed in numbered sets of "Autobridge Refills".
Automatic squeeze
A squeeze position that succeeds against either opponent. Compare with Positional squeeze.
Average

1. In matchpoint scoring, one-half the matchpoints available on a given deal.
2. An average score is sometimes awarded to one or both pairs when for some reason they cannot play the board. If neither pair is at fault or both pairs are at fault, the director may decide to award an average to each side. Law 12.C.2 of the Laws of Duplicate Contract Bridge states that if one pair is at fault, it receives an average-minus (at most, 40% of the available matchpoints on the board). A pair not at all at fault receives average-plus: 60% of the available matchpoints on the board, or, if greater, the average of the matchpoints the pair earned on other boards played during the session or of the matchpoints earned against their current opponents. The assigned scores need not sum to the total available matchpoints.
3. In IMP (Butler) pairs, "average" refers to the "datum" used in scoring.

Avoidance play
A play designed to keep a particular defender off lead, often to prevent the lead of a suit through a tenace position in either declarer's hand or dummy.

== B ==
Back in
To make a partnership's first bid, having previously passed. For example, in 1♥ – (P) – 1NT – (P); 2♣ – (Dbl), the doubler has backed into the bidding.
Backward finesse
A combination of two finesses in a suit such that the first finesse is "backward": that is, leading away from the hand containing the tenace.
Balance
To keep the bidding open when it is about to be passed out at a low level. For example, if the bidding goes 1♥ – (P) – P – (1NT), the 1NT bid is a balancing action. The balancing bid is often made with a hand of substandard strength in order to prevent the opponents from securing a low-level contract.
Balanced distribution

1. Narrowly, a balanced distribution of a hand is 4–3–3–3, 4–4–3–2 or 5–3–3–2. Equivalently, there are no voids, no singletons, and at most one doubleton.
2. Balanced is sometimes used in a broad sense that includes semi-balanced. Broadly, balanced distribution permits no void, singleton, or 7-card suit.

Balanced hand
A hand with balanced distribution in the narrow or wide sense just above. On the first round of bidding, natural notrump bids generally denote balanced hands.
BAM
Board-a-match, one method of scoring a duplicate bridge session or tournament.
Bar
To prevent a player from making a bid, either by a penalty caused by an irregularity, or because partnership agreement requires a pass in a given situation. In either case, the player is said to be "barred."
Bar bid
A bid which by partnership agreement requires partner to pass at future turns to call in the current auction. Raises of partner's weak two opening bid are one common example. The raise might be extending the preempt, to make, or to push the opponents a level too high. If the opponents bid over a bar bid raise, the partner who made the bar bid may intend to pass, double for penalty, preempt, or raise again to push the opponents. Hence, the reason that partner is barred. The partner who made the bar bid may be ″operating.” None of the other three players can know the intent of the player who made the bar bid. Thus, the partner must pass, and the opponents must guess.
Barometer scoring
In a duplicate event, the posting of contestants' running scores after each round. Knowledge of the current standings often adds excitement to the contest, and can affect the strategies adopted by those in a position to win the event.
Bath coup
A holdup by declarer, to prevent an opponent from continuing a suit. In the classic position, declarer holds ♠AJ2 and West, on declarer's left, leads ♠K from ♠KQ1098. By playing the 2 on West's K, South makes it impossible for West to continue spades without giving South a free finesse.
Beer card
The ♦7.
Below the line
In rubber bridge, the place on the score pad (below the main horizontal line) where trick points scored for making a contract, i.e. tricks bid for and taken exclusive of overtricks, are recorded. These are the points counted towards game. See Above the line and Bridge scoring.
Benjaminised Acol or "Benji"
A variant of Acol where 2♣ and 2♦ are strong bids of different strengths, and 2♥ and 2♠ are weak twos. Invented by Scottish international player Albert Benjamin.
Better minor
A commonly used term for the choice of minor suit opening bid with less than four cards, typically in five card major systems. In Standard American Yellow Card, it is normal to bid the longer suit with 3 cards in one and two in the other, and 1 ♣ with 3–3. In this sense the term is a misnomer as a poor club suit (e.g. Jxx) may be opener instead of a stronger diamond suit (e.g. KQx). "Prepared minor" would be more precise terminology. See prepared bid.
Bermuda Bowl
The trophy awarded to the winner of the World Zonal Open Team Championship, the most prestigious in bridge. More commonly the term refers to the competition itself, a biennial two-week tournament among open teams that have qualified in their geographic zones.
Bid

1. A specification of both level and denomination or strain, such as three notrump or four hearts. While any legal bid constitutes a potential contract, some bids carry special coded meanings when used by the partnership as a conventional bid and as such are not normally intended as a potential contract.
2. An obsolete term meaning "contract" (noun).

Bid out of turn
A bid erroneously made when it was another player's turn to bid. Subject to penalty.
Biddable suit
A suit that a partnership regards as long and strong enough to be bid naturally. Partnerships often employ different standards of length and strength for suits named in opening bids, in responses, in rebids and in overcalls.
Bidding
The first stage of a deal, when players jointly determine the final contract. Having examined their own cards, they make a series of calls in rotation, which is called the auction or the bidding.
Bidding box
A box placed on the table (one box for each player) that contains cards with calls printed on them, as well as other cards such as "alert". By selecting and displaying a card, a player can make a call without speaking. Silent bidding removes one source of unauthorized information from the game.
Bidding space
The number of steps available in an auction, or the number of steps consumed by a bid. The sequence 1♣ – 1♦ consumes only one step, whereas 1♦ – 2♣ consumes four steps. Because alternative bids are skipped, it often happens that the more steps a bid takes up, the more specific meaning it carries. See Useful Space Principle.
Bidding system
The complete set of agreements and understandings assigned to calls and sequences of calls used by a partnership, including a full description of the meaning of each treatment and convention.
Biltcliffe coup
(British slang) A sarcastic term applied to a poor result as a consequence of four steps: (1) the opponents are about to play in a part score, when you bid in pass-out seat, (2) the opponents then bid game, (3) you double for penalties, and (4) they make the contract. In some circles, the coup is not recognized unless the contract makes through misdefense.
BIT
Break in tempo. See Tempo def 2.
Blackwood convention
Popular bidding convention in contract bridge, used to determine number of partner's aces/kings to evaluate for slam bids.
Blank

1. (Adjective) Unprotected by other, usually lower cards in the same suit: "I held the blank king of spades."
2. (Verb) To discard in such a way as to leave a card unprotected: "She blanked the king of spades."

Blitz
(Slang) A win by a sufficiently wide margin in IMPs to earn the maximum possible number (or difference) of victory points.
Blocked
(Adjective) If a suit is divided between partners in such a way that the hand with the shorter holding has only high cards, the suit cannot be run without an entry to the longer holding in another suit; it is then said to be blocked. If North holds ♦AK and South holds ♦QJ10, South cannot cash a third diamond trick without an entry in another suit. The diamonds are blocked until North is able to unblock by playing the ace and king.
Board

1. One particular allocation of 52 cards to the four players including the bidding, the play of the cards and the scoring based on those cards. Also called deal or hand.
2. A device that keeps each player's cards separate for duplicate bridge.
3. The dummy's hand. For example, "You're on the board" means "The lead is in the dummy".

Board-a-match (BAM)
A form of scoring for teams, analogous to matchpoint scoring for pairs. A team earns 1 point if its pairs score higher than the opposing pairs (with the same cards at the other table), 1/2 for equal scores, and 0 for lower scores. Board-a-match scoring is now less common than IMP scoring, or IMPs victory points in a Swiss teams tournament.
Body
Intermediate cards such as the 9, 8 and 7, that contribute to a suit's trick-taking potential.
Bonus
In bridge scoring, beyond points for bid tricks taken, which are awarded for making a contract, the additional points awarded for making a doubled contract, or for making doubled or redoubled overtricks. There are different bonus amounts at the partscore, game, small slam, and grand slam levels. The size of most bonuses depends on the vulnerability. Bonus amounts are different in rubber bridge and duplicate bridge. See Bridge scoring.
Book

1. (Noun) The basic six tricks that must be taken by the declaring side. The first six "book" tricks are always assumed and are not taken into account in bidding or scoring. Thus, a contract at the 1-level commits declarer to take at least 7 (that is, 6 + 1) tricks, and provides trick points only for the trick above book. The term apparently originated from the whist practice of arranging the first six tricks into a stack called a "book."
2. (Noun) The number of tricks that the defensive side must take so as to hold declarer to his contract. If the contract is 4♠, defenders' book is 3.
3. (Verb, usually passive) Slang. As declarer, to have lost the maximum number of tricks without being set. At 4♠, declarer is "booked" when he has lost three tricks.

Bottom
At matchpoint scoring, a result no better than any other by a pair playing the same cards, resulting in an award of minimum matchpoints; either jointly (a shared bottom), or alone (a cold bottom, or zero).
Boxed
(British slang) Adjective applied to a card found to be face-up during dealing, and by extension to the whole pack. Also used for a card found to be face-up in a hand extracted from a duplicate board, or for the hand itself.
Bracket
A group of entries in a tournament that will eventually have one winner. The grouping is often done on the basis of masterpoints.
Break

1. (Noun) The distribution of cards in a suit between the two opponents' (often unseen) hands: "I got a 4–1 spade break." An even break occurs when the cards are distributed evenly or nearly so, such as 3–3 or 3–2. A bad break, connoting a distribution that is difficult to handle, suggests an unexpectedly uneven distribution, such as 5–1 or 6–0. See distribution.
2. (Verb) To be divided between two hands. "The spades broke 3–2."
3. (Verb) To lead a particular suit for the first time during a particular deal.
4. (Verb) Slang. To play for and find a particular distribution, usually the most favorable. "I broke the spades."

Bridge maxims
A compilation of short "laws", "rules" and rules-of-thumb advice; often, not always, valid.
The Bridge World (TBW)
A monthly magazine based in New York City, The Bridge World is the oldest continuously published periodical concerning contract bridge, and the game's most prestigious technical journal.
Broken sequence
A sequence of honor cards, one or more of which is missing, for example AQJ.
Bullet
(Slang) An ace.
Bump

1. (Slang) A single raise of partner. Used as a noun or a verb.
2. In duplicate bridge, an adaptation of the Mitchell movement to accommodate a half table. The extra pair moves around the room, substituting themselves in for a particular other pair, bumping out the pair for one round.

Business double
A penalty double, in contrast to various competitive and informatory doubles including takeout doubles and negative doubles.
Bust
(Slang) A very weak hand. Sometimes paired with the name of a long suit: for example, "club bust" to denote a hand with long clubs and very little high card strength. See also Yarborough.
Busy

1. A card that is needed for some purpose is said to be busy. For example, cards that a defender is trying to preserve while declarer executes a squeeze are "busy". Contrast Idle.
2. A busy defense is an alternative term for an active defense.

Butler, or Butler scoring
A method of scoring in duplicate bridge pairs events. Each pair's result on a board is compared against a "datum" score which is the arithmetic mean of all the results (usually after exclusion of one or more of the top and bottom results), and the difference converted to IMPs. Sometimes, the median is used instead of the mean.
Bye

1. A round of an event during which a team or pair is not scheduled to play.
2. A location ("bye-stand") such as a chair or table, where boards are kept when not in use during an event. Typically used in a Mitchell movement with an even number of pairs when there is a "share and relay".

== C ==
Caddy
An assistant to the director, or Head Director, primarily responsible for moving boards between tables and collecting score slips.
Calcutta

1. Cross-IMP scoring.
2. A tournament in which bettors bid on participating pairs or teams. The proceeds from the auction are distributed partly as prizes to the top finishers, partly to the bettors who successfully bid on them. A pair or team can typically buy an interest in itself.

Call
Any bid, pass, double, or redouble in the bidding stage.
Canapé
An approach to bidding in which a player bids his shorter suit prior to his longer suit. A feature of the Blue Team Club and the Roman Club.

Captain

1. In a teams competition, one person called the captain must represent a team in stipulated official settings and make stipulated official decisions for a team. A playing captain (pc) is eligible to participate as a player at the table; a non-playing captain (npc) may not play. Many team competitions including WBF world championships limit teams to six players, thus to seven members depending on the kind of captain. Other team officials such as a coach are not team members and are not covered in the rules of bridge.
2. The partner who makes the decision for a partnership in certain bidding situations, such as ace-asking sequences.

Card reading
The act of determining the distribution of cards in unseen hands, and the location of high cards therein, by analyzing the bidding, play and other clues.
Carding
The defensive signaling used by a partnership.
Carryover, or carry-over
In a complex event, some participants begin a later stage with scores that depend on performance in an earlier stage. Simple accumulation of scores from stage to stage is full carryover but the term is commonly used only when carryover is less than full.
Some team events have a later knockout stage with carryover equal to some fraction of any margin of victory from an early-stage match between the same teams.
Many tournaments for teams, pairs, or individuals have stages that progressively reduce the field, such as by cutting the bottom half at the end of each day. Sometimes the qualifiers continue with a fraction of their qualifying margins as carryover, which effectively gives weight less than one to points scored in the earlier, larger, lower-quality field. Sometimes there is no carryover; comfortable and borderline qualification are equivalent in the next stage.
Cash
To take a trick with a card that is currently the highest in the suit, thought likely to succeed, or to take all available winners in a suit.
Cavendish variation
A version of Chicago, with dealer's side not vulnerable on the second and third hands, as in the standard version.
CBF
Canadian Bridge Federation.
Change of suit
A bid in a new suit, as 1♠ in the sequence 1♦ – 1♥; 1♠.
Checkback Stayman
A common conventional agreement following a 1NT rebid, searching for an unbid major suit or a preference to responder's major.
Chicago
A variant of rubber bridge in which a rubber consists of four deals with vulnerability predetermined for each deal.
Chicane
A hand without any trumps.
CHO
(Slang) Centre-hand opponent, a derogatory or facetious term for one's partner, or partners generally. Compare LHO and RHO, left- and right-hand opponents.
Chuck
(Slang) An error in bidding or play, which was or might have been costly. Also used as a verb.
Chunky
A suit with enough honor strength to play well unaided by partner's cards (but not solid) is chunky. Normally said of four-card suits. AQJ10 is a chunky suit; AQ96 is not chunky.
Claim
A statement by declarer about how the remaining unplayed tricks will be won or lost. Normally the claiming player exposes his hand and describes the sequence of play for the remaining tricks (but such plays as finesses, unless already proven, are disallowed). A claim is best made only when the play of the rest of the hand is obvious. Claims are often inadvisable: apart from the possibility of a mistaken analysis, it can take longer to explain the line of play than to play it. See also Concession.
Clear a suit
Knock out an opponent's high-card control of a suit, or unblock one's own high cards.
Closed hand
Declarer's hand (as distinct from the dummy, which is faced or open).
Closed room
In a team match, a room where two of the pairs compete, and in which spectators are not allowed.
Coffeehousing
Making improper remarks to mislead the opponents, or asking improper questions designed to suggest a defensive play.
Cold
A contract that a player cannot fail to make, even against the best defense on any lie of the cards, is cold.
Colors first
A bidding approach where players indicate suits (denominations) before showing high card strength. For example, natural suit overcalls and natural one-level suit opening bids are usually "colors first". Natural notrump opening bids and natural notrump overcalls usually show strength rather than suits. A Michaels cue bid is usually "colors first", but a takeout double is usually more "values first".
Combination

1. Suit combination.
2. A combination finesse is one of several tactics in play of the cards that includes multiple finesses in one suit or combines another technique with a finesse.

Combination play
A line of play that offers more than one chance to take additional tricks: for example, playing to drop an honor in a longer suit and then finessing for an honor in a shorter suit.
Come-on
A defensive signal that encourages partner to continue a suit, usually by means of the rank of the card used to follow suit.
Comic notrump
A notrump overcall that shows a weak hand with a long suit, to which the overcaller can escape if doubled. Also known as Gardener 1NT.
Communication

1. The placement of the lead in one or the other of the two partnership hands, so as to make a subsequent lead from the more advantageous hand, specifically the ability to place the lead in such hand.
2. The means of conveying a message to partner via the bidding and by the card played to a trick. The only legal means of communication is through the calls and plays themselves, rather than through mannerisms such as tone of voice and hesitations. Often generalized as communications in both senses.

Comparative scoring
The method of scoring used in matchpoint or Board-a-Match events. The metric used is not the number of points earned on a particular deal, as it is when using quantitative scoring, but the number of pairs that have been out-scored.
Competitive auction
A bidding sequence which involves both partnerships. Also, competitive bidding.
Concession
A statement by a player as to the number of remaining tricks that he must lose. See also Claim.
Condone
To act after an opponent's irregularity without arranging for the penalty specified in the Laws to be applied.
Congratulatory jack
The unnecessary play (by follow-suit or by discard) of a jack following partner's exceptionally successful action. More often used by the defense, but possible as a play from dummy.
Congress
(Mainly British) A nationally or locally organised duplicate bridge competition held at a single location and usually involving both pairs and teams events, typically lasting one or two days but sometimes as many as ten. The more usual North American term is tournament.
Constructive

1. Bidding that is aimed at reaching a side's optimum contract, as distinct from calls intended to interfere with the opponents' bidding.
2. Constructive raise: by partnership agreement, a single raise of a major suit opening that shows more strength than usual.

Contract

1. The statement of the pair who has won the bidding, that they will take at least the stated number of tricks. The contract consists of two components: the level, stating the number of tricks to be taken (in addition to the book tricks), and the denomination, denoting the trump suit (or its absence in a notrump bid). The last bid in the bidding phase denotes the final contract.
2. Short for **contract bridge** in contrast to **auction bridge** (auction) and other card games in the family.

Control

1. A feature of a hand which prevents the defenders from taking sufficient immediate tricks in a specific suit so as to set the contract or make the setting of the contract unavoidable. Aces are termed "first-round" controls and kings are termed "second-round" controls. In trump contracts, voids are also considered first-round controls and singletons second-round controls. See also Stopper.
2. (Said of trump contracts) Declarer's ability to manage the trump suit successfully. To lose control usually means being forced to shorten one's trumps so much that the opponents can subsequently control the play of the hand. See **Forcing defense**.

Control-bid
A bid that shows control of a particular suit. Often a cue bid, but not all cue bids are control-bids.
Convenient club
See Short club.
Convention

1. An agreement between partners on an artificial meaning of a call or sequence of calls, which is not necessarily related to the length and strength of bid suits or of willingness to play in notrump. Many bidding conventions are artificial; see, for example, **Slam-seeking conventions**.
2. An agreement that a particular defensive play has a special meaning. Compare with Treatment.

Convention card
A form filled out by a partnership and available to their opponents, that shows the bidding and play conventions they are using. Normally used during tournaments, their format may be prescribed by the governing bridge organization.
Convert

1. To change the effect of a call. For example, passing partner's overcall of 2♦ when playing **Michaels cue bids** converts the overcall from a request to bid a major suit to a contract of 2♦. There are many other applications: for example, to pass partner's **takeout double** is to convert it to a penalty double.
2. In rubber bridge and Chicago, a part score is converted into game when a further score brings the total below the line to 100 or more points.

Correct
In the bidding, to choose (usually) partner's first bid suit; in that case, a correction is equivalent to a preference.
COS
Acronym or initialism for Choice of Slams. An artificial or natural bid made to ask partner to select a strain from several choices where the slam might be played.
Count

1. (Noun) The number of cards held in a suit or suits, usually said of an opponent's hand.
2. (Verb) To determine, by inference or by follow-suit, the number of cards held in a suit by an opponent.
3. (Noun) In **squeeze** play, the number of tricks that declarer must lose before the squeeze can function. See rectify the count.

Count signal
A defensive card play that shows whether the player has an even or odd number of cards in a suit.
Coup

1. Any extremely skillful play.
2. Any of several specific play techniques, such as the **Scissors coup**, **Trump coup**, **Devil's coup** or **Vienna coup**.

Coup en passant
The lead of a side suit in which both second and third hands are void, second hand holding a high trump, in such a way that third hand cannot be prevented from taking a trick with a low trump. It is a form of elopement.
Coup without a name
See Scissors coup. "Coup without a name" is an earlier term for the coup, conferred by Ely Culbertson.
Cover card
A card (honor or extra trump) which is known to compensate one of partner's losers; for example, a king in trumps covers partner's trump loser.
Crack
(Slang, verb). To make a penalty double. Also, "cracked", a doubled contract, regardless of the result; as in e.g. "The contract was 2♠ cracked".
Crash

1. (Usually written CRASH or CRaSh) Acronym for Color, RAnk and SHape; a convention showing a 2-suited hand, as an overcall at first opportunity after an opponent's strong artificial 1♣, 1♦, 2♣ or 2♦ opening. The two suits share the same color (red or black), rank (majors, or minors) or shape (rounded or pointed). The type of pairing is shown by the number of steps above RHO's bid which are taken up by the over call.
2. (Uncapitalised) The play of two winners by a pair on a single trick: for example, the ace and king of trumps. This usually involves a declarer's use of a deceptive play to cause a defender to follow suit with one high card (for example, the king from Kx when the other defender holds the singleton ace).

Crocodile coup
On defense, second hand's play of a higher card than apparently necessary, so as to obtain the lead. The play is intended to prevent fourth hand from being forced into the lead to make a return favorable to declarer. The name suggests a crocodile opening its maw to swallow up partner's winning card.
Cross
To enter the opposite hand. Normally used of dummy or declarer's hand: "He crossed to dummy in diamonds."
Crossruff
A playing technique in trump contracts, where extra tricks are gained by ruffing in both hands alternately.
Cross-IMP scoring
A form of IMP scoring in pairs tournaments, where each pair's score is determined as an (averaged) sum of differences to all other scores (rather than to a single datum score). Also known as X-Imps or Calcutta.
Cuebid, cue bid, or cue-bid

1. A bid of the opponents' suit in a competitive auction. Usually a conventional, forcing bid that shows strength or an unusual hand, or a particular distribution.
2. A bid that shows a control in a suit (usually with an ace or king, sometimes with a void), but does not indicate length or strength in the suit otherwise. See control bid. Partnership agreements indicate when in an uncontested auction a bid is considered a cuebid. Usually used in exploring for a slam contract (see **Bridge conventions (slam seeking)**), or for showing stoppers needed for a notrump game.

Culbertson four-five notrump
A slam-seeking convention devised by Ely Culbertson, in which a player bids 4NT or 5NT to show possession of defined numbers of keycards (aces, and kings in bid suits), and to which that player's partner responds in generally natural fashion. Since the 1950s, it has been almost entirely superseded by variants of the Blackwood convention.
Culbertson system
The earliest dominant bidding system, developed by Ely and Josephine Culbertson. Its principal features were an approach–forcing bidding style, four-card majors, strong two-bids and the use of an honor trick table to evaluate hand strength.
Curse of Scotland
The ♦9. The origin of the term is uncertain.
Cut in and cut out
In rubber bridge, it is customary on completion of a rubber to invite other players in the cardroom to play in the next one, often by a cry of "Table up". The players in the completed rubber draw cards to determine who will withdraw; the one or more who draw the lowest card or cards are said to cut out, and their replacements to cut in.
Cutthroat bridge
A form of three-handed bridge.

== D ==
DAB
An abbreviation of directional asking bid.
Danger hand

1. An opponent who, if he obtains the lead, can damage declarer's prospects.
2. When defending, either declarer's or dummy's hand which, if it gains the lead, can damage the defenders' prospects.

Datum
The mean or median of raw scores on a deal. The datum is used as a basis for calculating IMPs for the participating teams or pairs. The datum may be trimmed by removing extreme scores at either end of the distribution, a procedure whose effect on a mean or on a median depends on the degree of skewness in the raw scores.

Dawdling
The practice of introducing an additional round (or rounds) to the bidding to show extra information. Example: On a 1NT – 3NT auction, responder has gone quickly to the final contract. When instead the auction goes 1NT – 2♦ ; 2♥ – 3NT, responder has dawdled with the Jacoby Transfer to announce their 5-card heart suit before going to 3NT. Important distinction: Dawdling is part and parcel of the fast arrival style of bidding, and refers to the bids that are not fast; not to be confused with the slow arrival style of bidding.

Dead

1. A hand that has no card of entry, usually in reference to the dummy.
2. A hand that has a suit consisting only of low cards of no significance. For example, two dead spades.

Deal

1. One particular allocation of 52 cards to the four players including the bidding, the play of the cards and the scoring based on those cards. Also called board or hand.
2. (Verb) To allocate the 52 cards to the four players or hands, 13 each.

Dealer
The player who makes the first call in the auction. In some versions of the game, this player also deals the cards. In rubber bridge, the first dealer is usually decided by a cut for the highest card. In duplicate bridge, cards are dealt only at the start of the session and the deal is preserved during the session by the use of boards. The "dealer" who will make the first call is identified by a mark on the physical board, commonly the word "dealer".
Deck
The 52 cards used in bridge.
Declaration
The contract in which a hand is played.
Declarative–Interrogative
D–I.
Declarer
Of the partnership that makes the final bid in the auction, declarer is the partner who first names the denomination or strain of the final bid, thus the strain of the contract. During the play, declarer sits across from the dummy and calls for cards from the dummy's hand, or "plays the dummy."
Declaring side
The side that wins the auction.
Deep finesse

1. A finesse against two or more cards.
2. The trade name of a commercially available computer program which performs double dummy hand analysis.

Defeat
(Said of the contract). To prevent declarer from taking the number of tricks called for by his contract. Also, set.
Defence
Declarer's opponents or their line of play.
Defenders
The pair that tries to defeat the contract.
Defensive bidding

1. A bid or sequence of bids designed to hinder the opponents' bidding, including sacrifices.
2. All bidding by the partnership which does not open, which necessarily begins with a double or overcall (intervention).

Delayed
Postponed, as the jump preference in the auction 1♥ – 1♠; 2♦ – 3♥. Many bids have a different meaning depending on whether or not they are made at the first opportunity.
Denomination (or strain)
Component of a bid that denotes the proposed trump suit or notrump. Thus, there are five denominations – notrump, spades, hearts, diamonds and clubs. The Laws of Contract Bridge (American edition) and Laws of Duplicate Bridge use the term denomination exclusively but "the modern term is strain" according to the sixth edition of The Official Encyclopedia of Bridge.
DEPO
Acronym for Double Even, Pass Odd. Conventional method for bidding over interference with Blackwood.
Deschapelles coup
On defense, the lead of an unsupported honor in order to create an entry to partner's hand.
Deuce
The lowest spot card, the 2. In signaling, it is the only unambiguous card.
Develop
To establish tricks in a suit, usually by forcing out the opponents' stoppers.
Devil's coup
In the endgame, the play of a side suit through a defender to create an over ruff and a subsequent trump finesse.
D–I
(Abbreviation of Declarative-Interrogative.) 4NT as a general slam try that asks partner to show features. D–I is incorporated in several bidding systems, including Neapolitan, Blue Team Club and Kaplan–Sheinwold. Players distinguish the D–I and Blackwood uses of 4NT by context.
Direction
A player's position at the bridge table (North, East, South or West).
Direct position
Usually said of a bid that is made immediately following RHO's bid. Contrast Balance (verb), on balancing action in balancing position.
Directional asking bid

Often abbreviated as DAB. A cuebid of opponent's suit below 3NT, showing a partial stop in that suit and requesting partner to bid notrump with a holding such as Qx or Jxx. Common in the UK, less so elsewhere.

Director
Also tournament director (TD). The referee (in duplicate bridge). The director enforces the rules, assigns penalties for violations, and oversees the progress of the game. The director may also be responsible for the final scoring. In a large tournament there may be several directors reporting to a Head Director. In ACBL-sponsored events, a director's ruling as to bridge fact may be appealed; a ruling as to discipline, so as to maintain an orderly event, may not.
Discard

1. (Verb) To play a card that is neither of the suit led, nor trump, and that therefore cannot win the trick.
2. (Noun) The card so played.

Discouraging card
A carding signal that discourages partner from leading a particular suit. Contrast Come-on.
Discovery play
A play, either by declarer or by the defense, intended to obtain information about the location of other cards.
Distribution
1. (Suit distribution) Of one suit on a deal, the numbers of cards or lengths in the four hands. Sometimes the length of a suit in one or two hands is known or presumed and its "distribution" covers only three or two hands, as "opposing distribution" said of the other pair from the perspective of one pair or player.
2. (Hand distribution, also shape or pattern) Of one 13-card hand on a deal, the numbers of cards or lengths in the four suits. Sometimes the length of one or two suits is known or presumed and "distribution" covers only three or two suits, as "distribution in the minors" said of one hand whose major-suit distribution is known.

General. The degree to which four suits in one hand, one suit in four hands, or all of the hands and suits are dealt in long and short holdings. Long and short holdings constitute "lots of distribution" and three-card holdings in particular constitute "no distribution".
Specific. Either way, four whole numbers that sum to 13 are commonly used to denote a distribution briefly, such as 4333 or 4–3–3–3 for a hand comprising one four-card suit and three three-card suits; or for a suit with one four-card holding and three three-card holdings in the four hands. Also 22 or 2–2 for the opposing distribution of spades when one pair holds nine of them; or for one hand's distribution in the minors when it holds nine in the Majors.
Fully specified. Conventionally neither 4333 nor 4–3–3–3 indicates which is the four-card suit in a hand while 4=3=3=3 means four spades, represented first, and three each in hearts, diamonds, and clubs. Thus 4=6=2=1 means 4 spades, 6 hearts, 2 diamonds, and 1 club.

Distribution points
A measure of one hand's strength due to the length or shortness of suits. See Hand evaluation.
DONT
Acronym for Disturb Opponents Notrump. A conventional defense to notrump opening bids.
DOPE
Acronym for Double Odd, Pass Even. A conventional method for bidding over interference with Blackwood.
DOPI
A proxi-acronym for Double, O (the letter O standing for zero or none), Pass and I (the capital i standing for the numeral 1 or one). A conventional method for bidding over interference with Blackwood. Pronounced "dopey."
Double
A call that increases penalties if the opponents fail to make their contract, but consequently also increases the bonuses if they make it. A player can double only a contract bid by the opposition. A natural double is referred to as penalty double. A double may have various alternative conventional meanings depending upon the bidding context. See Informatory double, Takeout double, Negative double, Lead-directing double, Responsive double and Support double.
Double dummy
(Adjective or adverb.) Said of a play or line of play that seems to be made with knowledge of all four hands, as if there were at least two dummies visible. Contrast Single dummy.
When said of the defenders jointly, "double dummy defense" suggests that that pair knows all four hands and agrees on both goals and tactics such as falsecards, as if the cards were visible and they discussed those points.
Double dummy problem
A bridge problem presented for entertainment or teaching, in which the solver is presented with all four hands and is asked to determine the course of play that will achieve or defeat a particular contract.
Double-elimination tournament, or double elimination
Double knockout.
Double finesse
A finesse for two missing cards.
Double into game
To double a part score such that, if the contract is fulfilled, the total of the doubled trick scores will exceed 100 points.
Double knockout
A form of knockout competition in which teams are eliminated after losing two matches rather than after losing one. Commonly, teams with no losses face each other (undefeated teams) and teams with one loss face each other (one-loser teams), insofar as possible.
Double negative
An agreement regarding a second negative bid by a player who has already made one. Normally used regarding sequences that follow strong, forcing opening bids.
Double raise
A raise of two levels, such as 1♠ – 3♠.
Double squeeze
A squeeze in which each opponent must guard a different suit, and both opponents must guard a third suit.
Doubleton
A holding of exactly two cards in a suit.
Down

1. A contract that is defeated is said to be down.
2. (Followed by a number) The number of tricks by which a contract fails: for example, "Down two."

Down the line
To bid the higher of two adjacent suits before the lower. For example, of two five-card majors, the spade suit is normally bid before the heart suit. Contrast Up the line.
Draw
To extract, usually trumps. To remove the opponents' trump cards is to "draw trumps."
Drive out
To force a stopper from an opponent's hand, usually by repeatedly leading the suit.
Drop

1. (Verb) To fall under a higher card: "The **♠Q** dropped under the **♠K**."
2. (Noun) That occurrence itself: "He played for the drop instead of finessing."

Duck
A play technique in which a player does not immediately play a card that might take a trick, but plays a small card instead.
Dummy

1. The partner of the declarer. Dummy's cards are placed face up on the table and played by the declarer. Dummy has few rights and may not participate in choices concerning the play of the hand.
2. The dummy's hand as exposed on the table.

Dummy play
The play of the hand by declarer. The apparent contradiction is due to the fact that declarer plays both declarer's cards and the dummy's.
Dummy reversal
A playing technique in trump contracts that gains extra tricks by ruffing in the hand that began with the longer trumps so that that hand ends up with shorter trumps.
Dump
To lose a match deliberately, usually so as to assist another team or pair in the event. A subject of considerable controversy in the 1990s and beyond.
Duplicate bridge
A form of bridge where every deal is played at several tables, by several pairs, and their scores on each deal are subsequently compared. A minimum of two tables (four pairs) are required for a duplicate bridge event. Each entry might be a pair, or a team consisting of two or more pairs; the type of scoring varies accordingly. The hands of each deal are kept in metal or plastic containers called boards that are passed between tables.
Duplication of values
Possession of values in the same suit in both partners' hands so arranged that they do not pull their full weight. (1) High card values in one hand and a singleton or void in the other; e.g. ♠KJ9 facing a void is much less useful than ♠KJ9 facing ♠Q4. (2) High cards in short suits in both hands, e.g. ♠AJ facing ♠KQ.
Dustbin Notrump
A bidding response of 1NT to an opening bid that doesn't show a balanced hand but a weak hand (6–9 HCP), no support for partner and no higher ranking 4+ card suit to bid. So the hand could be unbalanced.

== E ==
Eastern Scientific
A bidding style that developed in the Eastern United States, particularly the New York region. It is characterized by five-card majors with a forcing one "notrump" response and limit raises, strong notrump with Jacoby transfers, and strong (but not game forcing) two-over-one responses.
Eau de cologne
(Slang, chiefly British) A hand with 7–4–1–1 distribution, from the cologne brand 4711.
EBL
European Bridge League, the sport governing body for contract bridge in Europe, and the sponsoring organisation for many bridge competitions there.
EBU
English Bridge Union, the official organising body of bridge in England.
Echo
The play of first the higher, then the lower of two cards of the same suit on separate tricks to encourage or, by prior agreement, to discourage (see upside-down signals) partner's continuation of a suit; or to signal possession of (normally) an even number of cards in the suit at the time the higher card is played.
EHAA
Every Hand An Adventure, a bidding style that emphasizes very weak notrump opening bids (often 10–12 HCP), four-card majors, and undisciplined weak-two bids.
Eight ever, nine never
A bridge maxim that advises players when to finesse for a missing queen. With eight cards in the suit, always ("ever") finesse; but with nine cards, never finesse, rather play for the queen to drop under the play of the ace and king. Experienced players often ignore this advice in favor of considerations such as the danger hand, combination play, and the known or inferred distribution of other suits.
EKB
Exclusion Keycard Blackwood, a variant of Roman Keycard Blackwood. EKB uses a suit bid rather than a notrump bid to show a void in that suit and to exclude the named suit ace from the count of keycards.
Elimination
The removal, by playing a suit or suits, of safe exit cards from defenders' hands, normally in preparation for an endplay. The classic (but not the only) example is to leave an endplayed defender with the choice of conceding a ruff and discard or giving declarer a free finesse.
Elope, elopement
To win a trick by ruffing with a trump lower in rank than an opponent's trump. The coup en passant is an example of an elopement.
Encrypted
An agreement that the meaning of bids or card signals may change as more information about a deal becomes available. For example, when declarer shows out of a suit, the defenders can tell whether the rank of West's lowest remaining card in the suit is even or odd (and declarer probably does not have that information). The defenders might have agreed that if West's lowest remaining card is even, normal attitude signals will be in effect, but if it is odd, upside-down signals will be used. In such a case, the defenders' agreement is encrypted.
Ending
The layout of the cards when just a few tricks remain to be played. In a "four-card ending", each player has four cards left. Such positions can be of special interest because squeezes and other endplays tend to occur near the end of the play.
Endplay
A play which forces a particular opponent to win a trick, so that that opponent must then make a favorable lead. That player is said to be "endplayed". Normally, the player who is endplayed is a defender. Although the word implies that the play occurs toward the end of a hand, it often occurs earlier, and in exceptional cases the opening leader can be said to be "endplayed at trick one."
Enter

1. To win a trick in the opposite hand, thereby giving it the right to lead to the next trick.
2. To make the first call for a partnership after the opponents have bid.
3. To join a bridge competition.

Entry

1. A card that allows a particular hand to win a trick that partner or an opponent has led to. Entries are vital to communication.
2. A seating assignment in a bridge competition. Entries designate the participants' initial table number, direction at that table, and (if applicable) section.

Entry-shifting squeeze
A squeeze in which the declarer decides whether to overtake the squeeze card or to let it hold the trick, depending on the play of the intervening opponent.
Entry squeeze
A squeeze that puts pressure on a holding that interferes with declarer's entries.
Equal level conversion (ELC)
An agreement concerning rebids after take-out doubles. Traditionally, the bid of a new suit by the player who has made a take-out double is considered forcing. Under the equal level conversion agreement, the bid of a new suit by the doubler is not forcing if it is at the same level as advancer's bid. So, equal level conversion means that in the sequence 1♠ – (Dbl) – P – (2♦); P – (2♥), 2♥ is considered non-forcing.
Equals
Cards in one hand that are adjacent in rank and thus have equal trick-taking power.
Escape suit
A long suit to which a bidder can escape if necessary or desirable. The bidder of a comic notrump might run to his long suit if doubled.
Establish
To make winners of the remaining cards in a suit by playing or forcing out higher cards.
Even

1. A split with the same number of cards in each hand. A 2–2 split is an even split.
2. Of the number of cards in a suit found in a hand: two cards, four cards, and so on.

Event
A duplicate bridge contest.
Exclusion bid
A bid, such as 2♦ in the Roman Club system, that shows length in all suits except the one named.
Exclusion Blackwood
An agreement that responder to a Blackwood bid will show the number of aces held outside a particular suit.
Exit card
A card that is used to put a different hand on lead, normally to avoid making a self-destructive lead in another suit.
Expert
Someone who plays bridge better than others in their usual level of play.
Exposed card
A card whose suit and rank become known through an irregularity. An exposed card may be subject to penalty.
Extra values
Values (in the form of High card points, shortage or cover cards), which are in addition to the values that a player has promised so far in the bidding.

== F ==
F1
Forcing one round. See One round force.
Face

1. (Noun) The front of a card; the side that displays its suit and rank.
2. (Verb) To turn a card so that its face is visible to other players.

Face card
A king, queen, or jack. Contrast Honor.
Factoring
The adjustment of matchpoint scores to correct for dissimilar conditions. For example, a game played with a Mitchell movement might have an extra N–S pair, causing a bye round for N–S. The top is therefore lower for N–S pairs than for E–W pairs, and the N-S scores are multiplied by a fraction (or "factor") to make them commensurate with the E–W scores.
Fall
To be captured by a higher card. See drop.
False preference
A return to partner's first-bid suit despite a longer holding in the second suit. Usually intended to give partner an opportunity for another bid.
False sacrifice
Phantom sacrifice.
Falsecard
A card played with the intention of deceiving an opponent as to one's true holding. Also, the act of making such a play.
Fast arrival
A style of bidding under which the fewer bids used to reach a contract (usually said of game contracts), the weaker the bidder's hand. Fast arrival holds that 1♠ – 2♦; 2♠ – 4♠ is weaker than 1♠ – 2♦; 2♠ – 3♣; 3NT – 4♠. A relevant term is dawdling. Contrast Slow arrival.
Fast rubber
A rubber completed in two games. See slow rubber.
Feature
An honor or shortness in a suit. Conventional bids such as splinter bids or D-I are intended to show or elicit features.
Fert
(Slang) Short for "fertilizer", a very weak opening bid. A systemic treatment in strong pass systems.
FG
an abbreviation for forcing to game; see Game force
Field
All the players in a bridge event, as in "with the field" to refer to an action that most players will take, and "against the field" for an unusual action.
Field a psych
Deciding correctly that partner has psyched in the absence of a call that reveals the psych. Sometimes used when that decision is made on the basis of unauthorized information or an undisclosed partnership understanding.
Fillers
Mid-rank cards that strengthen a suit. See body.
Final contract
The last bid made on a hand.
Finesse
An attempt to gain power for lower-ranking cards by taking advantage of the favorable position of higher-ranking cards held by the opposition.
Fit

1. A partnership's combined holding of many cards in a suit (usually 8 cards or more in the two combined hands) that might be used as trumps.
2. Two hands that are productive together (i.e., that have at least one fitting suit and few wasted values). Compare with Misfit.

See also Moysian fit and Golden fit.
Fit bid
A bid in a suit that shows length and strength in the bid suit plus a fit for partner's suit. Jump shifts in competition are often defined as fit-bids. See also Fragment bid and Mixed (definition 2).
Five-card majors
An agreement that an opening bid in spades or hearts promises at least five cards in the suit. The alternative agreement is four-card majors.
Fix

1. (Noun) An undeservedly poor result, usually caused by an opponent's error or eccentric play that happens to turn out well.
2. (Verb) To be the victim of a fix: "We were fixed on Board 8."

Flag-flying
An obsolete term for making a preemptive bid.
Flannery
A conventional opening bid of two diamonds (some prefer two hearts instead) to show 11–15 HCP with 5 hearts and 4 spades.
Flat

1. Flat hand: A hand that lacks distributional features such as a singleton, a void, or a very long suit. Often, 4–3–3–3 distribution.
2. Flat board: A deal in duplicate bridge that results in scores across the field that are identical, or nearly so.

Float

1. To be followed by two or three passes. For example, West's spade bid "floated around" to South in 1♠ – (P) – P.
2. To fail to cover the card led, usually by two consecutive hands. "South floated the **♠Q** to East."

Flower movement
An adaptation of the Howell movement in which the players, rather than the boards, progress regularly from table to table. Also known as "Endless Howell".
Follow suit, sometimes simply "follow"
To play a card of the same suit as the one that was first led to the trick. Failure to follow suit when one can do so constitutes a revoke.
Force to
To bid with the intention of causing the bidding to proceed to a particular level. For example: "In this auction, 2♣ forced to game", or "My reverse forced to the three-level."
Forcing bid
A bid that, by partnership understanding, requires the bidder's partner to make another bid. A forcing bid is not necessarily a strong bid. It is legal to pass partner's forcing bid, and players occasionally do so if they believe it advantageous on a given hand, but it is damaging to partnership confidence.
See also Game force, Grand slam force and One round force.
Forcing defense
The lead and subsequent continuation of a suit that the defenders believe declarer will have to ruff in the long trump hand. The strategy is to shorten declarer's trump holding so as to leave the defenders in control of the hand. See Tap.
Forcing notrump
An agreement that a 1NT response to a 1♥ or 1♠ opening is a forcing bid.
Forcing pass

1. A pass in a competitive auction that requires partner either to make another bid or to double or redouble the opponents' current call. Experienced partnerships often have agreements about the meaning of bidding immediately in contrast to making a forcing pass and then bidding over partner's double (pass and pull).
2. An initial pass when playing a strong pass system.

Forcing take-out
Obsolete name for a strong jump shift by responder.
Fork
A tenace.
Fouled board
A board whose cards are not distributed as they were when first played, due to returning the cards to their slots erroneously.
Four-card majors
An agreement that an opening bid of 1♥ or 1♠ promises at least four cards in the suit bid. The usual alternative is five-card majors. The four-card major agreement was standard during the first four decades of contract bridge, but has since given way to five-card majors in most "standard" systems such as 2/1 game forcing and Standard American. It is used in Acol, the Blue Team Club and EHAA.
Four-deal bridge
See Chicago.
Fourth

1. A player needed to complete a table, usually said of rubber bridge.
2. Of four-card suit length: for example, Q987 is referred to as "queen fourth" or "queen-fourth".

Fourth hand
The fourth player with an opportunity to bid, or to play to a trick.
Fourth suit forcing (FSF, or 4SF)

1. The initial use of a bid of the fourth suit as forcing to some level.
2. An agreement that the partnership's bid of the fourth suit, in addition to its forcing nature, is possibly artificial.

Fragment
A holding of three or even two cards in a suit, thus not long enough to suggest as a trump suit. A partnership may treat the bid of a fragment as a means of implying shortness in another suit (see fragment bid). A fragment may also be bid after the single raise of a major as a help suit game try.
Fragment bid
A second-round jump bid (usually a double jump) that by agreement shows a fit with partner's last-bid suit and shortness in another suit. Under this agreement, in 1♣ – 1♥; 3♠ the bid of 3♠ is a fragment bid, showing a fit for hearts and a singleton or void in diamonds. The suit of the fragment bid is often three cards long. Compare with Splinter bid.
Freak, or freak hand
A hand with a very long suit or suits. Most would regard a hand with two six card suits as a freak.
Free bid
A bid that is made when a pass would still allow partner to make a bid. Normally used of a bid that is made after partner has opened the bidding and RHO has overcalled. Compare with Negative free bid.
Free finesse
A position in which a player leads up to an opponent's tenace, solving that opponent's possible guess. The term is normally used when the player is forced to make that lead.

	♥ Q 8	
♥ J 5	**W N↑ S↓ E**	♥ K 3
	♥ A 10	

Frozen
A frozen suit is one that neither side can play without damage to its own holding in the suit. Declarer can sometimes duck the defense's lead to freeze the suit. See example at right.

== G ==
Gambling 3NT
An opening bid of 3NT. The bidder hopes to make the contract by means of a long minor suit rather than by a preponderance of high cards.
Game

1. A contract, bid and made, worth 100 points or more. The minimum undoubled game contracts are 3NT (40 for the first trick + 30 each for the second and third); 4♥ and 4♠ in the majors (4 tricks × 30 points per trick); 5♣ and 5♦ in the minors (5 tricks × 20 points per trick). Game can also be made via a doubled or redoubled contract: e.g., 2♠ doubled is worth 2 × (2 tricks × 30 points per trick) = 120 points. The pair bidding and making the game is awarded a bonus. See **bridge scoring**.
2. In rubber bridge and Chicago, a score of 100 or more points below the line, achieved either by making a game contract or by converting a part score.

Game force (GF or FG)
A bid that asks partner not to pass before the partnership's bidding has reached game (or the opponents have been doubled at a level high enough to compensate). Some treatments relax the requirement: for example, the agreement that in the sequence 1M – 2m, the 2m response is a game force unless the suit is rebid. So, in 1♠ – 2♦; 2♥ – 3♦, 3♦ would cancel the game-forcing message of the 2♦ bid.
See also Forcing bid, Grand slam force and One round force.
Game try
A bid that invites partner to bid game in a particular suit, made when a fit in that suit is known more than one level below game. Routinely the occasion a single raise from one to two of a major, as both 1S – 2S and 1C – 1S – 2S (opponents silent). In those two auctions all five bids from 2N to 3S are potentially game tries. What does it mean to bid one side suit rather than another? A short suit game try shows singleton or void in the suit bid, which implies significant duplication of values if partner holds the K or Q (the A or J, less so, and three small shows there is no duplication). A help suit game try shows at least three cards, generally with at least two losers. In 1984, the Encyclopedia referred to the entry "weak suit game try" and gave three small cards for example. It also referred "game try" to the entry "trial bid" with example holdings xxx, Axx, KTxx, and Jxxx in the side suit; shortness is a good holding and so is a good suit. Such a suit is likely to be a good one for the defenders to attack. A long suit game try shows a suit of at least four cards, so that a double fit is not unlikely; if a major suit, that is a potential alternative trump suit. Anyway, it shows that a cover card is useful regardless of length, and other cards are likely to help.
Golden fit
A combined partnership holding of at least eight cards in a suit. In the UK, simply known as a fit.
See also Moysian fit
Good
Said of a card or cards that have been established.
Goren system, or Goren
A bidding system dominant in the United States from the 1940s through the 1960s, based on the Culbertson system. The principal difference between the two systems was in hand evaluation: Culbertson used honor tricks to assess a hand's strength whereas Goren used high card points and distribution points.
Goulash
A style of dealing, usually in rubber and Chicago games, where the cards are not thoroughly shuffled between deals and are dealt in groups. It results in "wild" card distributions.
Grand coup
A trump coup in which the cards ruffed in the long trump hand are already winners.
Grand slam
See slam.
Green
(Slang, mainly British) Non-vulnerable. From the colour of the paint on a duplicate board. Also: "green all" and "both green", neither side vulnerable; and "at green" or "green against red", non-vulnerable against vulnerable.
Grand slam force (GSF)
A method of determining whether the partnership holds the top trump honors when the bid of a grand slam is a possibility. In its original form, the GSF was initiated with a bid of 5NT, asking partner to bid a grand slam with two of the top three honors in the trump suit. Depending on the prior bidding, other bids are often used in place of 5NT, and there is a variety of schemes for responding to the GSF. See Josephine.
See also Forcing bid, Game force and One round force.
Grosvenor gambit
A play that creates no direct advantage and might lose. Its principal features are that an opponent will not suspect that such an inept play has been made, and that once the opponent realizes what has occurred, he will be frustrated and angry (and therefore less effective) during subsequent hands. The ploy was first described in a satiric story by Frederick B. Turner in the June 1973 issue of The Bridge World.
Guard
A holding that prevents an opponent from taking a trick or tricks. See stopper, guard squeeze.

== H ==
Hand

1. The 13 cards held by one player on a deal.
2. A deal or board.
3. Ordinally, a player counting in rotation from dealer or first hand. For example, "Third hand bid 1♠."

Hand pattern
See distribution.
Hand record
A document that lists the cards in each hand of every board played in a duplicate bridge session. Often, hand records also list contracts each partnership can make with double dummy declarer play and double dummy defense.
Help suit game try
The bid of a side suit after a single raise, used to help partner evaluate game prospects when opener's hand is roughly a trick stronger than a minimum opening. For example, after 1♥ – 2♥, opener might rebid 3♣ with a side club suit or a strong club fragment. The bid tells partner where high cards will be most helpful, and requests partner to take positive action, such a direct jump to game, with strength in that suit. Otherwise, the bid requests partner to sign off (in this example, by bidding 3♥). See short-suit game try and game try.
Herbert negative
Use of the cheapest bid (sometimes only the cheapest suit bid) as an artificial negative response to (for example) forcing 2-bids, strong artificial 2♣, or takeout doubles. It was advocated by Walter Herbert.
Hesitation
A brief pause before a bid or play, considered somewhat shorter than a Huddle.
High–low signal
See Echo.
High card

1. An **honor card**.
2. The highest-ranking card in a suit at any point during the play.

High card points (HCP)
A measure or estimate of the strength of cards in the play of a deal. Routinely the high card points of all 13 cards in one player's hand are counted in sum, as a measure of playing strength of the entire hand, or one component of such a measure. Every honor card is assigned a numeric value. See Hand evaluation.
Hold

1. To keep declarer to a particular number of tricks, usually the number required to make the contract.
2. To have in one's hand a particular card or set of cards.
3. (Of a card) To win a trick although a higher card is outstanding.

Hold up

1. (Verb) To defer taking a winning card until an advantageous point in the hand, usually in reference to tricks that the opponents have led to. There are various purposes for holding up a winner, but it is frequently done to force the opponents to use their entries too soon.
2. (Noun) The act of holding up a winner.

Holding

1. The cards in a player's hand at a particular point in the play (often, at the start of the play).
2. The cards in a specific suit in a player's hand.

Honor/honour, or honor/honour card
An ace, king, queen, jack or ten.
Honors/honours, or honor/honour bonus
At rubber bridge and Chicago, a scoring bonus. The bonus is 100 points for one hand holding four of the five trump suit honors. The bonus is 150 points for all five trump suit honors, or all four aces in a notrump contract.
Honor/honour tricks
A method of hand evaluation used in the Culbertson system, which assigns point values to honors and combinations of honors. AK is two honor tricks, AQ is 1 1/2 honor tricks, A or KQ is 1 honor trick, and Kx is 1/2 honor trick. Similar in concept to quick tricks in the play of the hand.
Hook
(Slang) Finesse (noun or verb).
House player
An employee of a bridge club who is available as a fourth.
Howell movement
A pairs tournament movement where each pair typically plays against all or most of the other pairs, and there is a single set of winners. Most of the pairs will move to a different seating position (usually at a different table) at the end of each round.
Huddle

1. (Noun) A pause prior to a bid or play of longer than usual duration.
2. (Verb) To take that lengthy pause.

HUM
Acronym or initialism for Highly Unusual Methods.

== I ==
Idle
(Said of a card) Available as a discard; not required for purposes such as guarding the opponents' suit or interfering with their communications.
IMP
Acronym for International Match Point.
Impropriety
A breach of ethical conduct or etiquette; an action that violates the proprieties.
IMPs
The form of duplicate bridge that uses International Match Points as a scoring method, as distinct from a tournament scored using matchpoints (MPs).
In back of

	♠ Q 5 4	
Irrelevant	**W N↑ S↓ E**	♠ K 7 6
	♠ A 9 8	

A card or holding that is to the left of, or behind, or over another. To say that the ♠A is in back of the ♠K is to say that the ace is to the left of the king, or behind it, or over it; so, the ♠A is in a position to directly capture the ♠K.
Individual
A form of duplicate bridge, scored at matchpoints, in which each player is paired with a different partner on each round.
Informatory double
A double that is intended to convey information rather than to exact a penalty from the opponents. Such doubles include the takeout double, the negative double, the support double, the responsive double and the lead-directing double, although the latter is intended to convey information and to penalize.
Infraction
A player’s breach of the Laws of Bridge or of a lawful regulation made under them.
In front of

	♠ Q 5 4	
♠ K 7 6	**W N↑ S↓ E**	Irrelevant
	♠ A 9 8	

A card or holding that is to the right of or under another. To say that the ♠A is in front of the ♠K is to say that the ace is to the right of the king, or under it, and normally cannot capture the ♠K if it is guarded.
Insufficient bid
A bid that is not higher than the immediately preceding bid, and is therefore illegal.
Insult
(Slang) The bonus for making a doubled or redoubled contract is sometimes referred to as the "insult" or as being "for the insult".
Insurance bid
A bid, usually a sacrifice bid, intended to keep the opponents from playing their presumed or inferred optimum contract. The bidder hopes that insurance premium – the penalty due to the sacrifice bid – will be less than the damage from allowing the opponents to make their contract.
Interference
A call, such as an overcall or an initial preempt, that is intended to make it more difficult for the opponents to bid to their best contract.
Intermediate
1) Nines, eights and sevens are sometimes termed "intermediate cards." See body.
2) A jump overcall that by agreement may be made with a hand of opening bid strength and a long suit is termed an "intermediate jump overcall."
3) An opening two-bid that by agreement may be made with values just short of those required for a game-forcing opening bid is termed an "intermediate two-bid."
International Match Point (IMP)
1) (Noun) A method of scoring, usually in a teams match, that compares the score achieved on a board with that obtained by one's teammates on the same board, and converts the difference between these scores to IMPs using a scale defined by WBF. The IMP scale's effect is to reduce the weighting of large differences, thus making it less likely that the outcome of an entire match will depend on one or a small number of boards. For example a difference of 30 (one overtrick) is worth 1 IMP, but a difference of 680 (say 1100 at one table and 420 at the other table) is worth only 12 IMPs.
2) (Verb) To perform the IMP score conversion.
Intervenor
The first player on the other side to make a call other than pass when one side has opened the bidding.
Intra-finesse
A technique that involves successive finesses against both opponents.
Inverted minors
An agreement that treats the single raise of a minor suit as strong, and a double raise as preemptive.
Invitation
A bid which invites the partner to bid on to game or slam if he has extra values. It is a non-forcing bid by definition. Compare semi-forcing bid.
IPBM
International Popular Bridge Monthly, a British bridge magazine.
Iron Duke, Not through the
A hackneyed phrase that describes the play of a high card by a player whose high card holding is led through; or, that player's statement.
Irregularity
A breach of procedure, as described in the Laws and Proprieties, in bidding or play. If one is available, a director should be called to the table to make a ruling.
Isolate
(Said of a menace card) To isolate a menace in squeeze play is to arrange that only one opponent can guard one of declarer's threat suits. The play is conceptually similar to transferring a control.

== J ==
Jacoby transfer, or Jacoby, or "transfers"
A bidding convention initiated by responder following partner's notrump opening bid that requests opener rebid in the suit ranked just above that bid by responder, i.e. a response in diamonds requests a rebid in hearts and a response in hearts requests a rebid in spades; other responses may carry other meanings; designed to make the stronger hand declarer.
Jacoby 2NT
By agreement, a forcing raise of a major suit opening bid, used in conjunction with limit jump raises. Opener is requested to rebid in a suit where he holds a singleton so that responder can better evaluate the fit.
Jam the bidding
(Slang) To preempt.
Jettison
The discard of an honor, often by a defender, and usually to unblock a suit.
Josephine
Grand slam force, an alternative term popular in Europe. The convention was developed by Ely Culbertson, and popularized in a late 1930s article by Josephine Culbertson in The Bridge World
Journalist leads
Opening lead convention, mainly against notrump contracts, designed to show both what the leader has, and to request specific partner actions in return.
Jump

1. (Noun) A jump bid.
2. (Verb) To make a jump bid.

Jump bid
A bid made at a level higher than the lowest level at which that suit could be legally bid.
Jump overcall
An overcall made at higher than the minimally legal level: for example, 1♥ – (2♠). In the 1930s, jump overcalls were treated as strong bids. They are now more frequently treated as weak, preemptive bids.
Jump preference
A preference to partner's first-bid suit, made at a level higher than the minimally legal level. In the following sequence, 3♥ is a jump preference: 1♥ – 1♠; 2♦ – 3♥. For many years, the jump preference was treated as invitational except in support of opener's minor, when it was treated as forcing. As of 2001, however, most experts treat all three-level jump preference bids as invitational following opener's one-level new-suit rebid: e.g., 1♣ – 1♦; 1♠ – 3♣
Jump raise
A raise of partner's suit one level higher than the minimum legal raise. For example, 1♥ – 3♥ or 1♦ – 1♥; 3♥
Jump rebid
A rebid of one's original suit, one level higher than necessary, usually showing a six-card suit: for example, 1♦ – 1♥; 3♦. The range of strength shown by a jump rebid is a matter of partnership agreement: some treat it as a one-round force, others (particularly if playing Kaplan–Sheinwold and the rebid suit is a minor) play it as only a little weaker than a game-forcing opening bid.
Jump shift
A jump bid of a new suit.
1) As a rebid by opener (e.g. 1♥ – 1♠; 3♣) or responder (e.g. 1♥ – 1♠; 1NT – 3♣), it indicates extra strength
2) As direct response (e.g. 1♥ – 2♠): usually, a very strong hand. However, another treatment (weak jump shifts, requiring prior partnership agreement) uses the bid preemptively to show a weak hand and a long suit.
Junior
A player under the age of 26. Various national, regional, and world competitions use this designation.

== K ==
Kaplan–Sheinwold (K–S)
A bidding system that uses five card majors and the weak notrump.
Keycard Blackwood, or Key Card Blackwood (KCB)
A variant of the Blackwood convention in which five keycards are counted, four aces plus the king of the apparent trump suit, rather than four aces alone. Commonly there is a follow-up to ask about the queen of trump ("Queen ask"), effectively the sixth keycard.
Kibitzer
A spectator who attends a game in person.
Kickback
An ace-asking or keycard-asking convention initiated by the first step above four of the apparent trump suit rather than uniformly by 4NT. Thus Kickback saves space when the trump suit is not spades. See Useful Space Principle and Blackwood: Asking bids other than 4NT.
Kiss of death
At pairs, plus or minus 200. A score of minus 200, down two undoubled and vulnerable, or down one doubled and vulnerable, is a likely bottom against a part score by the opponents. A score of plus 200 from making five-odd of a major after stopping in a partial, is a likely bottom against the game contracts bid by other pairs holding the same cards.
Knockout (KO), or Knockout Teams
A single-elimination tournament for teams-of-four. Routinely each round pairs all of the competing teams in head-to-head matches—win or lose; no draw or tie. Winners advance to the next round and losers are eliminated. The size of the field, or initial number of competing teams, must be a power of two. Only then, the format generates for each round an even number of teams, which enables a complete set of head-to-head matches.
Minor variants of great practical importance handle fields of any size by incorporating byes (definition 1) or matches with more than two teams (stipulated to have more than one winner, more than one winner, or both).
Two major variants are double knockout, in which teams are eliminated after losing two matches, and repechage, in which one-match losers drop into a secondary event from which some number of top performers return to the primary event.
Knockout squeeze
A type of squeeze that operates in part against the defender's trump holding, when the defender threatens to win a plain suit trick and then lead a trump, thus reducing declarer's ruffing tricks. It is usual to call this play a knockout squeeze when the squeezed defender is second to play to the trick, and to call it a backwash squeeze when the squeezed defender is fourth to play.
Kock–Werner Redouble
A rescue mechanism employed when partner's bid is doubled for penalties. Invented by Rudolf Kock and Einar Werner of Sweden. See also SOS Redouble.

== L ==
Last Train
A conventional bid that is one step above the current bid and one step below game in a trump suit. It is a mild slam try and conveys no information about the suit bid. After 1♥ – 3♥; 4♣, 4♦ is Last Train, invites slam, and does not necessarily show a diamond control.
Late play
A board that is played after the remainder of the event has finished, usually because of slow play or an irregularity.
Law of Total Tricks (LTT), or "The Law"
A guideline stating that the total number of cards held by both sides in their longest trump fits equals the total number of tricks available to both sides in their best trump contracts. See Hand evaluation.
The Law is sometimes interpreted to mean that one side can profitably contract for a number of tricks equal to its own combined trump length; for example, compete to 3♠ with a nine-card spade fit.
Laws of Contract Bridge and Laws of Duplicate Bridge
The definitions, procedures and remedies that define how rubber bridge and duplicate bridge are played. The Laws include the Proprieties, which discuss the game's customs and etiquette — often far more important than procedural matters. The Laws apply worldwide. Individual sponsoring organizations, such as the ACBL and the EBL, establish their own regulations for play, which may amplify the Laws but may not conflict with them.
One important difference between the laws of rubber bridge (contract) and duplicate bridge is that rubber players are expected to deal with irregularities themselves while duplicate players are expected to call the director.
Laydown
A contract that can be made on any rational line of play.
Lead
1) The first card played to a trick, which dictates the suit that others must play if able to do so (see follow suit).
2) The hand that is entitled to lead to the next trick is said to be "on lead" or to "have the lead."
3) See opening lead.
Lead-directing double
A double by the partner of the prospective opening leader that requests the lead of a particular suit. Experienced partnerships usually agree on a set of suit priorities, such as opening leader's bid suit, doubler's bid suit, dummy's first bid suit, or a suit that dummy has just bid conventionally.
Lead out of turn
Playing a card when it was another player's turn to lead. Subject to penalty.
Lead through strength
A maxim that advises a defender to lead a suit in which LHO has high card strength, forcing declarer to play high or low before third hand plays. The corollary is that a defender is advised to lead up to weakness in the fourth hand.
Leap
To make a jump bid.
Leaping Michaels
A conventional overcall in 4♣ or 4♦ made in defense to opposing 2-level or 3-level preemptive openings. Leaping Michaels shows a strong two-suited hand (5–5 or longer) that is less suitable for a takeout double and is game forcing. Described as an overcall by some of a weak two-bid of a major, others expand its application to all weak preempts at the 2 or 3-level in both the majors and minors.
Leave in
To pass, often used of passing when partner's double was followed by a pass.
Lebensohl (Leb)
Responder's bid of 2NT as a puppet to 3♣ in preparation for a sign-off. Normally used after an overcall of partner's 1NT opening, or after a double of partner's weak two bid. Also used after opponents weak two bid and partner's balancing take-out double.
Leg
(Slang) game. Normally used in reference to rubber bridge. "A leg up" means being vulnerable vs. non-vulnerable opponents. "Cut off their leg" means becoming vulnerable vs. opponents who are already vulnerable.
Length
The number of cards held in a suit.
Let through
(Slang) To allow a contract to make by misdefense.
Level
1) The number of tricks that (when added to the book of six tricks) a bid or contract states will be taken. For example, a bid at the four level contracts to take (6 + 4) = 10 tricks.
2) The property of a contract that states whether it is at the part-score, game or slam level.
Lever
(Slang, verb) To double. (In Britain at least, a penalty double: Leave 'er in. The past participle "levered" means, doubled for penalties.)
LHO
Left-hand opponent
Light
(Adv.) To enter the auction with relatively low values (for example, to "open light" or "overcall light"). To do so can be either a matter of tactics or of general style.
Lightner double
A penalty double, usually of a slam contract, that requests partner to choose an unusual suit for the opening lead. This criterion tends to regard as typical (and thus to exclude) a trump lead, the lead of defenders' bid suit, and the lead of an unbid suit.
Limit
In the bidding, to define a hand's strength with some degree of precision.
Limit Bid
A bid which establishes narrow limits on both the high card strength and distribution of the bidder's hand. In many bidding systems the following bid types are limit bids: (1) Natural notrump bids indicating balanced hands within a narrow high card strength range; (2) raises of partner's suit indicating a minimum number of cards in the raised suit, a narrow high card strength range, and likely ruffing values; or (3) rebids of one's own suit indicating a minimum suit length, an unbalanced hand, and a narrow high card strength range.
Limit jump raise
An invitational jump raise of a major suit, such as 1♥ – 3♥. Limit jump raises usually guarantee at least an 8-card fit in partner's major suit and around 10–11 HCP or the distributional equivalent.
Limit raise
Any call which invites partner to bid game in a suit partner has bid, previously. A limit raise promises trump support and hand strength about a king less than a minimum strength game force.
Line
1) (with "the"): A line on a bridge scorepad that separates points for tricks that count toward game (see Below the line) from those that do not (see Above the line).
2) On a given hand, the play strategy that is adopted by declarer or by the defenders.
3) Bidding: See Up the line and Down the line.
Lock
1) (Noun) A contract that is certain to succeed.
2) (Verb) To force a particular hand onto lead such that it cannot relinquish the lead unscathed.
LOL
Little Old Lady (pronounced El-Oh-El). A facetious reference to a seemingly weak player.
Long cards
Cards of the same suit, remaining in one hand, after all the other cards in that suit have been played from the other hands.
Long hand
In a partnership, the hand with the longer trumps.
Long suit
1) In a hand, the suit with the greatest number of cards. Seldom used of a suit with fewer than five cards.
2) Any suit of unusual length.
3) Any suit of at least four cards. A four-card suit is likely to be called long when in context concerning a hand that is known to hold another suit, or even two, expected to be at least as long.
Long suit game try
Following a major suit raise to the two level, the long suit game try names a suit with at least four cards, so that partner's cover card is useful regardless of length in the suit. A double fit is not unlikely and, if a major suit, that is a potential alternative trump suit.
2) Alternative term for a help suit game try. In some usage the "help suit game try" is barely distinguishable from the long, in some barely distinguishable from the weak.
Loser
A card which apparently cannot take a trick.
Loser on loser
A card play tactic that attempts to create an advantage by playing two losers, often of different suits, on the same trick. Loser-on-loser play has many applications, including the creation of a ruffing position for declarer, the avoidance of overruffs by the defense, and interference with the opponents' communications.
LROB
Limit Raise Or Better. Example: "1H-2NT = Heart-support, LROB."
Losing trick count (LTC)
A method of hand evaluation based on counting losers.
Love
No score. "Love all" means that neither side is vulnerable.
Low
(Adjective) A card that is not expected to take a trick.
Low–high signal
On defense, to play a higher card, having already played a lower one, so as to convey information to partner. Contrast Echo, or high–low signal.
Lucas twos
A synonym or close variant of the Muiderberg convention, a weak two-bid showing 5 cards in a major and at least four cards in another suit.

== M ==
MacGuffin
A defensive card that, if retained, is a liability on one line of play, but that, if played, will be missed on another line of play. The term may be derived from the filmic plot device of the same name.
Major penalty card
A card that is exposed by a defender prematurely and through intentional play; or, an honor card that is exposed prematurely even if accidentally. A major penalty card remains face up on the table to be played at the first legal opportunity, including as a discard. Contrast Minor penalty card.
Major suit
The heart suit and the spade suit are major suits, often referred to simply as the majors. Declarer scores 30 points for each trick taken in an undoubled contract with a major suit as trump. Because game requires at least 100 points for tricks bid and made, both 4♥ and 4♠ (or 2♥ doubled and 2♠ doubled) constitute game contracts. Contrast Minor suits.
Major tenace
The highest and the third highest remaining cards in a suit, held in the same hand. For example, the ♠AQ before spades have been played. Tenaces define the structure of finesses. See minor tenace.
Make
(Verb) To take at least as many tricks as a contract calls for. Frequently used in the past tense of the verb, i.e. Made.
Mama–Papa
(Adjective) An unsophisticated game, approach to bidding, or line of play.
Marionette Bid
(Noun) A type of relay bid in which the cheapest response is expected nearly all the time, thus similar but not identical to a puppet bid. Name derives from "a puppet with strings."
Marked
To be known to hold a particular card: "He was marked with the ♥Q."
Marked finesse
A finesse for a card that evidently lies with a particular opponent.
Master
The highest card of a suit that is yet to be played.
Masterpoints
Units awarded, usually by national organisations, for successful performance in a bridge tournament.
Match
A series of hands played by two teams in knockout events. One pair from each team sits North-South at one table and the other pair sits East-West at the other table.
Matchpoints
A type of scoring in duplicate bridge. A pair's score on a given board is one matchpoint for every pair they outscored and one-half matchpoint for every pair they tied. (Outside the US these awards are often doubled, so as to avoid the award of fractional matchpoints.) See comparative scoring.
Matrix
The layout of the cards that play pivotal roles in certain endplays, most typically squeezes.
Maxims
A maxim of bridge is a brief expression of a general principle of the game. Most Bridge maxims have some validity but none are true in all circumstances.
Maximal overcall double
By prior agreement, a game-invitational double of an overcall that leaves no room for a bid, when a bid would invite game. For example, after 1♠ – (2♥) – 2♠ – (3♥) there is no room below 3♠ for a game invitation (and a bid of 3♠ itself would be taken as merely competitive), so a double is used as a game invitation.
McKenney
See Suit preference signal.
Menace
A card that requires an opponent to retain a higher card in the same suit, as a guard. The term is typically used of squeeze play.
Merrimac coup
The deliberate sacrifice of a high card to remove a vital entry to an opponent's hand, usually the dummy. Named for a ship sunk during the Spanish–American War, to block the entrance to a harbor. Sometimes confused with, and spelled as, the Merrimack, the American Civil War ship that fought the Monitor. See Deschapelles coup.
Michaels cue bid
By prior agreement, an immediate cue bid in the suit of an opponent's opening bid, such as 1♦ – (2♦), for two-suited takeout. The cue bid of a minor suit shows length in both major suits. The cue bid of a major suit typically shows length in the other major suit and in an unspecified minor suit.
MiniBridge
A simplified form of contract bridge designed to expose newcomers to declarer and defensive playing techniques without the burden of learning a detailed bridge bidding system.
Minor penalty card
A card below the rank of an honor card that is exposed by a defender prematurely but accidentally, via mishap. A minor penalty card remains face up on the table until played. The minor penalty card must be played before any other card below honor rank in the same suit; however, an honor in the same suit may be played before the minor penalty card is played. Contrast Major penalty card.
Minor suit
The club suit and the diamond suit are minor suits. Declarer scores 20 points for each trick taken in an undoubled contract with a minor suit as trump. Because game requires at least 100 points for tricks bid and made, both 5♣ and 5♦ (or 3♣ doubled and 3♦ doubled) constitute game contracts. Contrast Major suits.
Minor tenace
The second-highest and the fourth-highest (or lower) remaining cards in a suit, held in the same hand. For example, the ♠KJ before spades have been played. See major tenace.
Mirror
Identical hand distributions: "North and South had mirror distributions."
Misbid
A bid that fails to describe the hand properly. Often a misdescription of a hand's shape, as distinct from an overbid or underbid.
Misfit
Two partnership hands, neither of which can support the other's long suit. For example, a red Two-suiter opposite a black Two-suiter constitutes a misfit.
Mitchell movement
A pairs tournament movement in which the pairs sitting in one direction (usually North-South) stay in the same seats throughout, but after each round the pairs sitting in the other direction (usually East-West) move to the next higher numbered table, and the boards are moved to the next lower numbered table. Unless an arrow switch is performed, the effect is to create two events, a "North-South" contest and an "East-West" contest, with separate winning pairs, though a single winner can still be determined by comparing percentage results.
Mixed
1) Of an event: contested by pairs or teams in which every pair comprises one male and one female player.
2) In the auction: A mixed raise is, by agreement, a jump cue bid of opener's suit in support of partner's overcall. It tends to show four card support for partner's suit and the strength of a good single raise. In 1♦ – (1♥) – 1♠ – (3♦), 3♦ is a mixed raise.
Morton's fork coup
A play that forces the defense to choose between taking a high card that will establish extra winners for declarer, and ducking the trick, after which the high card cannot be cashed.
Movement
In a tournament, the scheme for the progression of players and boards from table to table, arranged so that a pair does not play the same boards twice, or meet the same opponents twice etc. The most common movements for pairs tournaments are Howell and Mitchell.
Moysian fit
A 4–3 trump fit, or a contract with such a trump fit. Named after The Bridge World editor Alphonse "Sonny" Moyse Jr, who wrote and published a variety of articles that promoted the virtues of such fits or contracts, some bidding styles designed to locate them, and some techniques for playing them well.
MUD
Acronym of "Middle, Up, Down", a lead convention which describes the sequence in which cards from a holding of three low ones (all less in rank than the 10) are played.
Muiderberg convention
A weak two-bid showing five cards in a major and at least four cards in another suit.
Multi
An ambiguous opening bid of 2♦ that promises one of several different types of hand. Originally entitled "multicoloured 2 Diamonds".

== N ==
Natural
A call which indicates either: (1) a willingness to play the contract named, (2) a suit bid suggesting length or strength in that suit, (3) a notrump bid that suggests a balanced hand, (4) a double that suggests the ability to defeat the opponent's contract, (5) a redouble to suggest that the contract can be made in the face of a double by opponents, or (6) a pass that suggests weakness, satisfaction with the last bid made or no desire to make a further call. Contrast Artificial.
NBB
Nederlandse Bridge Bond (Dutch Bridge League).
Negative double
A conventional call used by responder in a competitive auction to denote possession of at least one unbid suit.
Negative free bid
Responder's suit bid following an opening bid and an overcall. Nonforcing by prior agreement.
Negative inference
An inference based on something that did not happen. For example, if a defender does not overruff, declarer might conclude that he could not overruff. Or if declarer does not ruff a loser in dummy, a defender might conclude that declarer does not have a loser in that suit.
Negative response
A bid that shows insufficient values for a stronger response. For example, a 2♦ response to a forcing 2♣ opening bid is often negative, as is a 1♦ response to a Precision 1♣.
Negative slam double
In a competitive auction, the double of a voluntarily bid slam to show no defensive tricks, and therefore to suggest a sacrifice.
Neuberg formula
In duplicate pairs tournaments, a method of fairly adjusting match point scores when not all boards have been played the same number of times. It gives equal weight to each board by calculating the expected number of match points that would have been earned if the board had been played the full number of times.
New minor forcing
By agreement, after 1m – 1M; 1NT, a bid of two of the unbid minor as artificial and forcing, often requesting three card support for responder's bid major or four cards in the unbid major. Sometimes called PLOB.
New suit
A suit that has not yet been bid.
NMF
New minor forcing.
No bid
An alternative to "pass". Used in the United Kingdom, where "pass" might be mis-heard as "hearts." Regarded as improper in the US.
Nonadverse suit, or non-adverse suit
A suit which has not yet been bid by either opponent.
Nonforcing bid, or non-forcing bid
A bid which partner may pass. See also Forcing bid, Invitation, Sign-off.
Nonvulnerable, or non-vulnerable
Not vulnerable.
None vulnerable
In rubber bridge, the state of the score in which neither pair has made a game. In duplicate bridge, the vulnerability condition under which neither pair is designated as vulnerable for the board in play. Also, "neither side vulnerable."
Norman four notrump
A slam-seeking convention
North–South
One of the partnerships designated on duplicate boards.
Not vulnerable
The state of vulnerability in which both bonuses and penalties are smaller. Therefore, less is at stake for a non-vulnerable pair investigating game or slam, or that is contesting the part score, than for a vulnerable pair. Also, "non-vulnerable."
Notrump, or no trump (NT)
A contract, or a bid that names a contract without a trump suit. Notrump is the highest-ranking strain. WikiProject Contract bridge deprecates the two-word "no trump", however "notrump" is the usual spelling in the United Kingdom and in those European countries which have adopted this English term.
Notrump distribution, no trump distribution, or NT distribution
Balanced distribution. WikiProject Contract bridge deprecates the two-word "No Trump".
NPC, or npc
Non-playing captain.
Nuisance bid
An interference bid whose principal aim is not to preempt or to compete for the contract, but nevertheless to upset the smooth flow of the opponents' bidding sequence.
Number, as "go for a number"
A very large penalty: "He went for a number." Often, "telephone number", alluding to the size of that number if regarded as a quantity. (Dating back to the 1930s when UK telephone numbers were only four figures, plus an exchange name!) See also

== O ==
Obligatory
1) Of a finesse: A duck, made in the hope that a high card will fall. For example, declarer holds ♥K432 opposite dummy's ♥Q765. The ♥2 is led to the ♥Q, which wins. Declarer now leads dummy's ♥5 and RHO follows with the ♥J. Declarer ducks, hoping that LHO must now play the ♥A. The play is obligatory because given the first heart trick, no other play can yield three tricks.
2) Of a falsecard: A falsecard that, like an obligatory finesse, cannot lose and might gain. An example is the play of the card that one is known to hold (for example, the play of a queen after it has been successfully finessed).
Odd
Specifying a level. To make 4♥ is to make four-odd.
Odd–even discards
A defensive carding scheme under which the play of an odd-numbered card is encouraging and that of an even-numbered card is discouraging. The rank of the card may be used to show suit preference.
Odd tricks
The number of tricks above six (the book) that are taken by declarer.
Off
1) (Slang) Down, or set. "We're off two" means "We have made two fewer tricks than our contract."
2) (Slang) offside.
Offense-to-defense ratio (ODR)
High ODR means a hand has characteristics more suited to winning the final contract, while Low ODR means it has characteristics more suited to defending against opponents' contract. ODR is not based on a mathematical formula, but refers to a player's judgement/perception of the hand.
Off shape, offshape, or off-shape
Having a distribution that does not quite conform to that suggested by a bid, such as an opening bid of 1NT with 2=2=6=3 shape, or a weak-two bid with a seven card suit.
Off the top
Said of some number of tricks that can be lost or won without gaining or losing the lead. "There were eleven tricks off the top in spades", to mean that declarer could take eleven tricks without interruption; or, "We're down off the top", to mean that the defenders, having the opening lead, can immediately take as many tricks as necessary to defeat the contract.
Offside
Unfavorably located, from the point of view of the player taking a finesse. If East holds the ♣K and North the ♣AQ, from South's point of view the ♣K is offside. Contrast Onside.
Olympiad
A world bridge championship held every four years under the auspices of the World Bridge Federation.
On
1) Makeable. A contract that can be made is said to be on.
2) Onside.
3) (Suffix) In rubber bridge, preceded by a number that indicates progress toward game. If one has 40 points Below the line, one has 40-on.
One club system
A bidding system that uses a bid of 1♣ as artificial and forcing, but not necessarily strong.
One over one, or one-over-one (1/1)
To an opening one-bid, any one-level response in a suit; that is, one of a higher suit in response to opening one of a lower suit. Contrast Two over one.
One round force
A bid that requests partner to ensure that the bidding continue for at least one more round. If partner's RHO bids, partner may pass, but is otherwise expected to bid.
See also Forcing bid, Game force and Grand slam force.
One-suiter
A hand with only one long suit, normally refers to a hand with a six card or longer suit.
Onside
Favorably located, from the point of view of the player taking a finesse. If West holds the ♣K and North the ♣AQ, then from South's point of view the ♣K is onside. Contrast Offside.
Open
1) In the auction: To start the bidding by making the first call other than Pass.
2) Of a room used at a team event: allowing spectators. Normally at least one of two rooms is closed to spectators.
3) Of an event: not restricting entries in some way that is implicit. So participation in an open event is unrestricted in at least one respect:

a) not by invitation only (invitational event)
b) not by qualification in a preceding event or qualifier
c) not by representation of geographic zones, nations, cities, clubs, etc; nor by requirement that pair or team members share geographic residence, club membership, etc (national event, etc)
d) not by age, sex, or playing record (seniors, Masters, etc).

Open is generally ambiguous but it does have the last sense (d) in the names of WBF world championship events, where the relevant Categories are Youth (with subcategories), Seniors, Women, and Open. For the WBF, transnational means open in sense (c).
Opener
The player who makes the opening bid.
Opener's rebid
Opener's second bid.
Opening bid
The first bid in the auction.
Opening lead
The first card led by defenders. The dummy is not faced until after the opening lead, which makes the choice of opening lead more difficult than other leads. The opening lead can determine the outcome of the deal.
Opening leader
The declarer's LHO, who always makes the opening lead.
Opponent
A member of the other partnership or team.
Optimum contract
In unopposed bidding, the contract that cannot be improved upon by further bidding, nor could have been improved upon by taking a different line in earlier bidding. The contract is regarded as optimum because it offers the maximum score while minimizing the risk of failure.
Our hand
(Informal) A hand on which "our" side can take more tricks than their side.
Out-of-the-blue cue bid
See Advance cue bid.
Over
See In back of.
Overbid
1) (Noun) A bid that overstates a hand's strength.
2) (Verb) To bid voluntarily to a contract that the partnership cannot make.
3) (Verb) To bid too high, irrespective of the result.
4) (Noun) (obsolete) In old texts, may refer to an overcall.
Overboard
(Slang) Having overbid.
Overcall
The first bid made by one of opener's opponents unless they intervene first by a double.
Overcaller
The player making an overcall; may also be referred to as the intervenor. Contrast Advancer.
Overruff
To ruff with a higher trump following a prior ruff on the same trick.
Overtake
To play a card higher than the winning card played by partner, unnecessary to win the trick but necessary to gain the lead.
Overtrick
A trick taken by declarer beyond the number of tricks required by the contract.

== P ==
Pack
Deck of cards.
Pair
Two players playing bridge together as partners. Also known as a Partnership.
Pairs
A form of duplicate bridge in which each pair competes separately, as distinct from team and individual events. Pairs events are normally scored by matchpoints.
Palooka
(Slang) Someone who plays bridge worse than others in their usual level of play
Panama
A defence to a Strong Club whereby two-level bids show the suit bid or the other three suits.
Par, or par score
On a given deal, the score that results from best bidding and best play by both sides. See optimum contract and par contract.
Par contest
A competition that uses composed deals, designed to test each pair's bidding and its card play. After the bidding, pairs are instructed to play (or defend) a specified contract. Results are compared not with other tables but with the predetermined par result.
Par contract
That contract which results from optimal bidding by both sides, and which neither side could improve by further bidding.
Pard
(Slang) Partner.
Part score, or part-score
1) A trick score less than 100, obtained by making a contract.
2) The contract that results in that trick score.
3) In rubber bridge, a total of fewer than 100 points below the line.
Partial
A part score.
Partial elimination
An endplay in which declarer is unable to remove all possible safe defensive exit cards, and must hope that the remaining cards are so distributed that the defense cannot get off lead safely.
Partner
The other member of the partnership.
Partnership
1) See pair.
2) Two partners who play together for an extended period.
3) The complete set of agreements entered into by a pair.
Partnership bidding
Sequences in which the opponents do not compete.
Partnership desk
A service, provided by some tournaments, that locates a partner for a player who does not yet have one.
Partnership understanding, or partnership agreement
An agreement between partners, reached prior to the beginning of play, concerning the meaning of a call or of carding.
Pass
1) A call indicating that the player does not wish to change the contract named by the preceding bid, double or redouble. To pass transfers the right to make the next call to passer's LHO, unless it is the third consecutive pass, which ends the bidding (but see Passed out). See also No bid.
2) To play, from third hand, a lower card than the one led to the trick. If declarer leads the ♥J, LHO plays a small heart, and declarer plays the ♥2 from dummy's ♥AQ2, declarer has passed the ♥J.
Pass and pull
To make a forcing pass and on the next round remove partner's double by bidding.
Passed hand
A player who passed instead of opening the bidding. The inference is that a passed hand does not hold the values required to open the bidding (unless playing a strong pass bidding system).
Passed out
1) A deal is passed out if the auction begins with four consecutive passes. There is no contract, no play of the hand, and (at rubber bridge) no score. The players proceed to the next deal.
2) A bid, double, or redouble (an action) is passed out if it is followed by three passes, which end the auction. The last action identifies the contract and the play follows.
Passive defense
An approach to defending a hand that emphasizes waiting for tricks that declarer must eventually lose, getting off lead safely, and avoiding plays that will set up tricks for declarer. Often indicated when neither declarer nor dummy has a running side suit or when the declaring side may have over-reached in the bidding. Contrast Active.
Pass-or-correct
A bid made in response to partner's ambiguous call. For example, South opens with 1♠ and West bids 2♠, by prior agreement showing hearts and a minor. North passes and East bids 3♣, expecting West to pass if he holds clubs and to correct to diamonds otherwise.
Pass out
1) To make the third of three consecutive passes following a bid, double or redouble.
2) To make the fourth of four consecutive passes. Thus, a bid cannot have been made and the table progresses to the next deal.
3) (Adjective) The seat where a pass would end the auction.
Pattern
See distribution.
Pearson points
High card points plus number of spades held. See Hand evaluation.
Penalty
1) A score awarded to the defense when declarer's contract goes down. The size of the penalty depends on the number of tricks that declarer was set, the vulnerability, and whether the contract was doubled, or redoubled. See Score.
2) A remedy assigned by a director to redress damage done by an infraction. The penalty for a minor, procedural infraction might be some number of tricks, matchpoints or IMPs, or disallowing a particular bid or play. A more serious violation of the game's Proprieties may be imposed by barring the offender from an event, a portion of an event, or from organized bridge.
Penalty card
A card, incorrectly exposed by the defense, whose subsequent proper play is governed by certain rules. See major penalty card and minor penalty card.
Penalty double
See double
Penalty pass
The pass of an informatory double, to convert it to a penalty double.
Percentage
In matchpoint scoring, refers to the number of matchpoints actually scored by a pair on a board, session, or event, as a percentage of the maximum number available.
Percentage play
A play that is chosen because the mathematics of suit distribution suggests that it is more likely to succeed than an alternative line. Usually said of play in a single suit rather than the hand as a whole.
Personal score
A record of the board number, opposing pair number, contract, declarer, tricks taken, and raw score kept by each player for the boards played by the partnership in a single session. The personal score often appears on the back of the convention card.
Peter
(Slang; chiefly British) See Echo. The term is said to derive from the Blue Peter, a nautical signal.
Phantom pair
In a pairs movement, if there is an odd number of pairs, then in each round one pair will have to sit out. The missing pair that they would have played is known as the phantom pair.
Phantom sacrifice
A sacrifice bid against a contract that the opponents would not have made. Also, False sacrifice or Phantom save.
Phoney club
A type of 1 Club opening bid which shows opening values but does not guarantee clubs, denies a five card major (and often 5 diamonds as well) and may have as little as one club (on a 4441 shape hand). Usually played as forcing for one round. A variant of a short club.
Pianola
(Slang) A hand that is so easy it plays itself. "Pianola" is a trademarked brand of player piano (a piano that plays automatically).
Pick up
1) (Verb) To run a suit without losing a trick in it.
2) (Adjective) Said of a partner who completes a pair, or of a pair that completes a team, just prior to the start of an event.
Pick-up slip
A type of score slip on which the result of a deal is recorded for the purpose of comparative scoring. Used in certain event formats, it is picked up after each round by the director or his caddy. Also referred to as a pick-up card. Contrast Traveller.
Pin
The lead of a high card from one hand to capture a singleton of lower rank in an opponent's hand.
Pip
1) A spot card.
2) A suit symbol (♠, ♥, ♦, ♣) on a card.
Pitch
To discard.
Pivot
1) (Adjective) Of the suit that both defenders must guard in a double squeeze.
2) (Verb) In party bridge, to change partners while remaining at the same table.
3a) (Verb) In duplicate bridge, to play one round in a given direction, and the next round in the opposite direction at the same table
3b) (Noun) In duplicate bridge, a pivot table is a table where each pair will perform a pivot. This can only happen in a Howell movement, or another similar movement, where players move between East-West and North-South during the course of the game.
Plafond
A French, whist-like card game whose scoring foreshadowed that used in contract bridge.
Plain suit
A suit that is not trump; a side suit.
Play
1) (Noun) The stage of a deal when players attempt to take tricks. The declarer tries to take at least as many tricks as the contract calls for, and the defenders try to prevent that outcome.
2) (Verb) To contribute a card to a trick, either by displaying its face (as in duplicate bridge) or by placing it face up on the table (as in rubber bridge).
Play for
To assume that the opponents have a particular distribution or holding, and to plan and conduct the play on that basis.
Playable
1) (Of a contract) A rational, if not necessarily optimal, choice of strain and level.
2) (Of an agreement) Leading to an acceptable result, if not in the best fashion.
Playing tricks
Cards, such as long cards, that will take tricks (usually, for declarer), and that therefore contribute to a hand's strength.
PLOB
Acronym or initialism for Petty Little Odious Bid, another name for New Minor Forcing. The name is derived from a diatribe by The Bridge World editor Alphonse "Sonny" Moyse Jr in the magazine's Master Solver's Club feature, which called the convention an "odious, meaningless, petty little bid".
Pocket
One of four slots in a duplicate board that hold the cards between plays.
PODI
A proxi-acronym for Pass=0, Double=1. Method for countering interference over Blackwood. Pronounced "podey".
Point
1) A scoring unit: e.g., a trick taken by declarer in a minor suit contract scores 20 points.
2) A metric used in hand evaluation, to quantify its strength in high cards and distribution.
3) A metric, such as masterpoints, used in rating players.
Point-a-board
Another name for board-a-match.
Point count
A method of hand evaluation which assigns a numeric value to a hand's high cards and distributional features, used as a guideline in bidding.
Point count trap
A hand whose intrinsic trick-taking potential is less than a conventional point count would indicate.
Pointed suit
Spades or diamonds. The term refers to the shape at the tops of the suit symbols. Contrast Rounded suit.
Portland Club
A bridge club in London which published the first version of the Laws of contract bridge. The club remains part of the ongoing process of revising the laws, along with the ACBL and the EBL, because of the vesting of the copyright.
Position
(Noun) Seat at the table: North, South, East, West; or first, second, third, fourth.
Positional squeeze
A squeeze that can succeed against only a specific opponent, because at least one threat must lie over its guard. Compare with Automatic squeeze.
Positive response
A bid that announces the possession of at least minimum values. Often said of a response to a forcing opening bid. Contrast Negative response.
Post mortem
(Slang) A discussion of a hand, and the nature of the result, after the play has concluded.
Powerhouse
An unusually strong hand.
Prealert
An alert which must be made at the beginning of the round before play begins on the first board. Different national governing organizations may establish different requirements for prealerts. Examples of methods for which the ACBL requires a prealert include the following:

- An agreement to lead the small card from "xx" on opening lead
- An agreement (canapé) to bid the shorter of two suits before the longer suit with a two-suited hand
- An agreement to use any bidding convention that entitles the opponents to consult a written defense during the auction

Precision, or Precision Club
A bidding system that combines the features of Kaplan–Sheinwold with a strong, artificial 1♣ opening bid.
Preempt, preemptive bid, or preemptive raise
1) A bid (or raise) predicated on length of a suit rather than overall strength, primary function of which is to interfere with the opponents' bidding by taking away bidding space they need to exchange information.
2) (Noun) A bid that has a preemptive effect, regardless of its intent.
Preference
A call that returns the bidding to partner's first-bid suit; for example, in 1♥ – 1♠; 2♦ – 2♥, 2♥ is a preference. A simple, non-jump preference shows neither strength nor support for the suit; it is simply a return to partner's presumably longer suit.
Prepared bid
A bid which differs from usual partnership practice that is chosen to avoid a later bidding problem. For example, playing five-card majors and holding a minimal strength opening hand, a strong four-card spade suit may be opened in preference to a weak five-card heart suit. See also prepared opening bid.
Prepared club
See short club.
Present count
A carding agreement under which a count signal shows the number of cards currently held. In a count-giving situation, a defender might first play the ♥3 from ♥753, and the ♥7 as his second play. Also, "current count."
Principle of restricted choice
A guideline to the play of the hand, concerning the probability of the location of key cards in the unseen hands. In particular it states that if a defender plays one of two adjacent missing cards (e.g. ♦QJ) then that defender is less likely also to hold the other missing card.
Progression
The movement of players and deals between rounds in an event.
Progressive squeeze
A squeeze in three suits that, when it matures, results in a new squeezed position in two suits.
Promote
1) In the play, to cause a card to become a winner.
2) In the bidding, to assign a higher value to a card, or to the hand as a whole, as a result of earlier calls made by partner or by the opponents.
Proprieties
A section of the Laws of Duplicate Contract Bridge that describes, in general terms, proper conduct as to the exchange of information concerning a hand, as to attitude and etiquette, as to partnership agreements, and as to spectators' conduct.
Protect
See balance. (In the UK, protect is the more usual term.)
Protest
See appeal. (In the UK, protest is the more usual term.)
Pseudo squeeze
A position that, to a defender, appears to be a true squeezed position, but is not. Declarer hopes that the defender will misplay as a result. The literature often gives as an example a position in which declarer has a void in dummy's apparent suit of entry.
Psych, psyche, psychic, or psychic bid
A call that grossly misstates high card strength or distribution, made so as to deceive the opponents. The Laws specify that psychic bids themselves are legal. It is, however, a violation to infer and fail to disclose that partner has psyched, when the inference is based on partnership agreement or experience. Sponsoring organizations regulate the use of certain psychic bids.
Psychic control
A bid that, by partnership agreement, announces that the player's previous bid was a psychic.
Pull
1) To remove the opponents' trumps.
2) To remove partner's double.
Pump
(slang) To force out an opponent's trump, usually by means of a forcing defense.
Puppet
An artificial bid that simply requests partner to make a specified cheap reply – commonly the cheapest sufficient bid, or next step.
Puppet Stayman
A version of Stayman employed after an opening bid of 1NT or 2NT which could include a five-card major.
Push
1) (Verb) To force the opponents to make any subsequent call at a level higher than they have as yet.
2) (Noun) A tied board in a pairs or team duplicate event.

== Q ==
Quack
A portmanteau of queen and jack. Used in situations where it does not matter whether the queen or the jack is held or played, as well as to emphasize that it does not matter. See Principle of restricted choice.
Qualifying
(Adjective) A session or sessions preliminary to the final of an event.
Quantitative
1) Of a bid: A call based, usually, on high card points, rather than a feature such as fit or shortness. A raise from 1NT to 3NT based on a 4–3–3–3 hand with 10 HCP is a quantitative raise.
2) Of scoring: The method of scoring used in rubber bridge or in IMP events. The metric used is the number of points earned on each deal, perhaps adjusted by the IMP scale and victory points. In contrast, comparative scoring is based on the number of pairs that have been out-scored.
Queen ask, or queen-ask
In Key Card Blackwood, the cheapest bid over the response to 4NT, to ask responder for the trump queen.
Quick tricks
In card play, top ranking holdings able to win tricks immediately. Similar in concept to honor tricks in the evaluation of hand strength.
Quitted trick
A trick whose cards have all been turned face down (duplicate bridge) or gathered in front of the trick's winner (rubber bridge). In rubber bridge, a player may inspect a quitted trick if his side has not yet led to the next trick. In duplicate bridge, a player may inspect a quitted trick only if told to do so by a director.
Quotient
Points won divided by the sum of points won and points lost, occasionally used to break a tie.

== R ==
Rainbow
A movement used in individual events.
Rainbow trick
A trick consisting of all four suits, typically involving low cards.
Raise
A bid of partner's suit at a higher level. A raise shows a fit for partner's suit. 1?–2? is a single raise; 1?–3? is a double raise.
Rank

1. The position of an individual card relative to others: Aces have the highest rank, followed by K, Q, J, 10, ... 2.
2. The order of denominations in the bidding. Notrump is highest-ranked denomination, followed by spades, hearts, diamonds and clubs. A higher-ranked suit may be bid at the same level as a lower-ranked suit; the reverse is not true.

Rebid

1. The second or a subsequent bid by the same player.
2. A bid by the same player in a suit he has already bid.

Rebiddable suit
A suit with sufficient length and strength, according to partnership agreements, to be rebid in certain defined circumstances.
Recap
(Abbreviation of "recapitulation") A summary of results in a bridge tournament.
Recorder
A member of a bridge organization whose responsibility it is to maintain a record of reports of possible violations of the Proprieties.
Rectify the count
To lose some number of tricks in preparation for a squeeze. Losing the tricks "tightens up" the end position, removing idle cards from the defenders' hands before they can be used as safe discards in the squeezed position.
Red
(Slang) Vulnerable. From the color of the paint on a duplicate board. Also: "Red vs. red" to mean both sides vulnerable, and "red vs. white" to mean vulnerable vs. not. (In British slang, those last two expressions are rarely used. The more usual ones are: "(at) game all", "both red" or "(at) red all"; and "at unfavourable", "at red", "red against green" or "red against not".)
Redeal
In rubber bridge, the prescribed remedy for a faulty deal. In duplicate bridge, redeals are not used except in special cases and under a director's supervision.
Redouble
A call that doubles the penalties and bonuses that apply to a previous double. Used conventionally, a redouble may also convey additional information.
Re-entry
A card that enables a hand to gain the lead on a later trick, after that hand has already gained the lead with a different entry card.
Refuse
(Verb). Of a trick, to duck.
Reject
To fail to comply with a bid that has made a request, such as an invitation or a transfer.
Relay bid, or relay
An artificial bid that requests partner to further describe his hand. The relay is usually the lowest available bid, so as to leave as much room for description as possible.
Relay system
A bidding system that consists of many relay bid sequences.
Relever or re-lever
(Slang) Redouble; by extension from lever.
Remove
To bid on over an undesired contract, especially a doubled contract.
Renege
Informal term for Revoke; associated with other games such as whist.
Reopen
See balance.
Repechage
A form of knockout competition in which winners advance and losers drop into a secondary event from which some number of top performers return to the primary event.
Rescue
To remove from a contract that partner has bid and which, often, has been doubled.
Responder
Opening bidder's partner.
Response
A bid by responder immediately following an opening bid and RHO's call.
Responsive double
A double that follows LHO's opening bid, partner's takeout double and RHO's raise of opener's suit, to show moderate values and no clear opinion as to the best strain.
Result merchant
(Slang) One who evaluates bids and plays according to their outcome, rather than to their intrinsic merit. Also, "Result player" and "Second guesser".
Retain the lead
Maintain the right to lead to the next trick by leading and winning the current trick.
Return
To lead back, usually the suit that partner led.
Reverse
A bidding sequence in which a single player, on consecutive calls, bids two different suits, and bids the two suits in the reverse order to that expected by the basic bidding system. The specific definition of a reverse therefore depends on the bidding system (see main article). The reverse is designed to show additional strength without the need to make a jump bid. Because the reverse takes up bidding space, the reverse bidder is usually expected to hold a stronger than average hand, usually more than 16 HCP.
Revoke
Failure to follow suit as required when a player is able to do so.
Rewind
(Slang) To redouble.
RHO
Right-hand opponent.
Right-Side the contract
A style of bidding which strives to select the Declarer most beneficial for the partnership. Example: After NT openings, Jacoby Transfers right-side the contract so that the NT opener is the Declarer: As the hand with the known long suit will be the dummy, this right-siding reveals to the opponents very little information that they do not already know.
Rise, as "rise with"
To play a high card in the hope of taking a trick: "Rise with the ace." Also, "go up with"
RKCB
Roman Key Card Blackwood, a slam bidding convention.
Robert coup
A rare end position which combines elements of ruff and discard, trump shortening, and endplaying to force an opponent to concede a trump trick
Roman
Descriptive of bids and carding agreements used or originated in the Roman system:

1. Roman 2♣ and 2♦: Three-suiters.
2. **Roman Blackwood**, **Gerber** and Roman Key Card Blackwood (RKCB): Step responses to the ace-asking bid that entail mild ambiguity.
3. Roman jump overcall: Two-suiter.
4. Roman asking bid: A request that partner bid his number of controls wholesale, via step responses.
5. Roman discards: odd-even discards.
6. Roman leads: Rusinow leads.

RONF
Acronym for "Raise (is the) Only Non-Force". A treatment used for responding to preempts, usually weak two bids. All bids except the single raise are forcing.
Rosenblum Cup
The award for winning the world knockout team championship that is held in even numbered years other than leap years. (The Bermuda Bowl is contested in odd numbered years and the World Team Olympiad in leap years.)
Rotation
The progression of the bidding and play in a clockwise direction around the table.
Roth–Stone
A bidding system popular in the U.S. during the 1960s. It features sound opening bids, five-card majors and negative doubles. It is the principal foundation for 2/1 Game Forcing.
Round

1. In the bidding, a sequence of four consecutive calls.
2. In duplicate bridge, a set of boards leading to another round (e.g., the semi-final round), or a set of boards that two pairs play against one another.
3. Of a control, the round on which the control can stop the opponents from winning a trick. An ace, for example, is a first round control; the king is a second round control.

Rounded suit
Hearts or clubs. The term refers to the shape at the tops of the suit symbols. Contrast Pointed suit.
Round-robin tournament, or round-robin
An event format in which each team eventually opposes each other team.
Rubber
In rubber bridge, the set of successive deals that ends when one of the pairs wins two games.
Rubber bonus
A bonus awarded to the pair winning the rubber: 500 points if the losers are vulnerable, 700 if they are not.
Rubber bridge
The original form of contract bridge, a contest with four players in two opposing pairs (as distinct from duplicate bridge, which requires a minimum of eight players).
Rubens advances
Transfer advances of overcalls. See Useful Space Principle.
Ruff
To play a trump on a trick when a plain suit was led.
Ruff and discard
The lead of a suit in which both opponents are void, so that one opponent can ruff while the other discards (or sluffs). A ruff and discard is usually damaging to the side that leads to the trick. Also, ruff and sluff or ruff and slough.
Ruff out
To establish a suit by ruffing one or more of its low cards.
Rule of Eight

1. Devised by Ely Culbertson. "The total of defensive honor-tricks that will be won at any bid (trump or no-trump) after each deal is about 8 out of the 13 tricks."
2. A way to decide whether to overcall an opponent's 1NT opening. Length in long suits, the losing trick count and HCP are combined.
3. Devised by David Burn from experience of playing with and of captaining teams of junior players. (1) Subtract the number of aces held by opponents from eight. (2) Don't play at that level.

Rule of Eighteen
Regulation by the World Bridge Federation stipulating that an opening bid is acceptable if the sum of the number of cards in the two longest suits plus the number of HCP is at least 18.
Rule of Eleven
A calculation that can be used when it is assumed that opening leader has led the fourth highest card in a suit. By subtracting the pips on the card led from 11, the result is the number of cards in the other three hands that are higher than the one led. Third hand, for example, can then make inferences about declarer's holding in the suit by examining his own and dummy's holdings; likewise, declarer can make inferences about right-hand-opponent's holding in the suit. (The rule can be modified to subtract from 12 if the lead is thought to be third best, and from 10 if the lead is thought to be fifth best.)
Rule of Fifteen
Guideline for opening light in fourth seat: open if your high card points plus your number of spades is 15 or more. Also known as the Cansino Count.
Rule of Five
When the bidding has reached the 5-level in a competitive auction, tend to defend rather than bid on. In other words, in competitive auctions, 5-level contracts belong to the enemy. See also Law of Total Tricks
Rule of Four
Avoid giving support for partner's 5-card suit if a superior 4–4 fit might be available.
Rule of Seven
When declarer's only high card in the suit led by the opponents is the ace, count the number of cards in that suit held by declarer and dummy, subtract from seven and duck that many times.
Rule of Three
On a competitive part score deal, with the points roughly equal between your side and theirs, once the bidding has reached the 3-level, tend to defend rather than bid on (unless your side has 9 trumps). See also Law of Total Tricks
Rule of Twenty
A widely used guideline of the Standard American Yellow Card (SAYC) bidding system which states that a hand may open bidding "normally" (that is, by bidding one of a suit) if the sum obtained by adding the combined length of its longest two suits to its high card points is twenty or more, but that weaker hands must either open with a preemptive bid or pass. See also Zar points evaluation method.
Rule of Two
When missing two non-touching honors, it is normally superior to finesse first for their lower honor. In the following two example hands, three tricks or the maximum possible are needed.

♠ A Q 10

♠ 7 6 5

♥ K J 10 5 3

♥ 8 7 6 4 2

In the first hand, finesse the ♠10, not the ♠Q. Similarly in the second, lead the ♥2 and when West follows with the ♥9, it is best to finesse the ♥10. When one of the missing honors is the 10 the rule will not apply, as one does not normally finesse for a 10 on the first round.

Rule of Two and Three
A bidding guide suggested by Ely Culbertson, which counsels preemptors to be within two tricks of their contract if vulnerable, and within three if not. Few players now follow the Rule of Two and Three.
Ruling
A finding and decision by a tournament director or appeals committee.
Run
To play the winners in a suit.
Rusinow leads
An agreement to lead the second highest of touching honors.

== S ==
Sac
(Slang) Sacrifice. Also, "sack."
Sacrifice

1. (Noun) A contract that was deliberately bid in the expectation of going down, in the hope of a penalty smaller than the opponents' expected score from making a contract they had bid.
2. (Verb) To bid to such a contract.

Safety level
A level at which the partnership can normally assume, on the basis of the previous bidding, that its contract will succeed. It is the point below which the partnership prefers to explore even higher contracts. Also, "security level."
Safety play
A play that maximizes the chances for fulfilling the contract (or for achieving a certain score) by avoiding a play which might result in a higher score. Contrast Percentage play, the best play in a suit, whereas a safety play is the best line for the contract.
Sandbag
(Slang) To bid weakly or pass with good values, in the hope that the opponents will get overboard.
Sandwich
An overcall made after an opening bid and response by the opponents. The overcall is "sandwiched" between two hands that have each shown strength.
Save
(Slang) Sacrifice.
SAYC
Standard American Yellow Card, a particular bidding system or the completed ACBL convention card that represents it.
Scientific
A style of bidding that attempts to narrowly limit the strength of a partnership's hands, so as to make its bidding more accurate.
Scissors coup
A loser-on-loser play meant to break the opponents' communications. Formerly known as 'Coup without a name'.
Score, or bridge scoring
1) The numeric result of a deal, session or event.
2) (Verb) Of a card, to win a trick: "The ♠Q scored."
Score slip
A paper form used to record the result of each deal in a duplicate bridge event when electronic scoring devices are not available. Depending upon the event format, the score slip may be either a pick-up slip or a traveller.
Scramble
1) To bid to a safer contract.
2) To score small trumps by ruffing, rather than as long cards. Often used of the play of a contract based on a Moysian fit.
Screen
A device which divides the table diagonally, visually separating partners from each other. Used in higher-level competition to reduce the possibility of unauthorized information.
Screenmates
Opponents who sit on the same side of the screen.
Seat
Position relative to the dealer: for example, dealer's LHO is said to be in second seat.
Second guesser
See result merchant.
Second hand
The player to the left of the player who has led to a trick.
Second hand low
A precept that advises second hand to play a low card on RHO's lead. See also Third hand high.
Section
A group of contestants in an event.
Seed
A ranking assigned to a contestant of relatively high rank.
See-saw squeeze
See Entry-shifting squeeze.
Semi-balanced hand
A hand with 5–4–2–2 or 6–3–2–2 distribution.
Semi-forcing bid
A bid which is conditionally forcing: one which requests partner to rebid unless his hand is minimal or sub-minimal for his previous bidding. Compare invitation.
Sequence
1) The auction, or calls made in the auction.
2) Two or more cards adjacent in rank.
Session
A period of play during which those entered in an event play designated boards against designated opponents.
Set
1) To defeat a contract.
2) The number of tricks by which a contract is defeated ("a two-trick set").
Set game
In rubber bridge, an agreement that partners will not change at the end of each rubber.
Set up
Establish.
SF
Semi-forcing.
Shaded
(Of a call) A call that is not quite warranted by the strength of the hand making it.
Shape
The distribution of suits in a hand.
Shift
1) (Verb) To lead a suit other than the one already played.
2) (Noun) In the bidding, a change of suit, usually said of a jump bid (see jump shift).
Shoot
To try for an unusually good result by adopting an abnormal line of play, typically at matchpoint scoring. Declarer hopes that the cards are distributed in such a way that a superior line of play will fail.
Short club
The natural opening bid of 1♣ when the suit contains three cards or less. Usually employed by players using the five-card majors treatment for opening bids when holding a hand with opening values but lacking a five-card major. When the hand contains two clubs and three diamonds, an opening diamond bid is preferred. Also, "short diamond." These bids may also be called "prepared minors" – "prepared club" and "prepared diamond", or "better minor" bids. The EBU "Orange Book" recommends the term "prepared club" for bids that show a minimum of three cards, and "short club" where it may only be two cards or less.
Short suit
1) In a 13-card hand, a singleton or void suit.
2) In a hand, that suit with the fewest cards.
Short suit game try
By agreement, a bid of a short side suit after a single raise, hoping to reach game. For example, after 1♥ – 2♥, opener might rebid 3♣ with a singleton or void in clubs. The bid tells partner where high cards will be least useful, indicating duplication of values. It requests partner to take positive action with high-card strength outside that suit. Otherwise, the bid requests partner to sign off (in this example, by bidding 3♥). See help-suit game try and game try.
Short-suit points
In hand evaluation, points counted for singletons and voids.
Show out
Fail to follow suit.
Shuffle
To mix the cards. Shuffling seldom results in random distributions: in the long run, the cards so mixed rarely match the mathematical expectancies.
Side
Partnership.
Side game
A secondary event played simultaneously with the main event.
Side suit
A suit that is not trump; plain suit. A side suit may nevertheless have significant length: see Two-suiter.
Signals
The conventional meanings assigned to plays made by the defenders in order to exchange information. Also, carding.
Signoff bid
1) A bid that requests that partner pass.
2) A call that denies extra values, one that normally results in a pass by partner. Compare non-forcing bid, forcing bid.
Sign off
To make a signoff bid.
Silent bidder
A sheet, typically of card or plastic, placed in the center of the table during the bidding period, and marked with numeral, suit and other symbols such that a player can indicate a call by tapping on them with a finger, writing implement, or the like. Largely superseded by bidding boxes.
Simple squeeze
A squeeze against one opponent, in two suits, with the count (definition 3).
Single dummy
The normal manner of play, with certain knowledge only of one's own cards and dummy's, and without verbal communication between partners. Contrast Double dummy.
Singleton
A holding of exactly one card in a suit.
Sit-out
A round in a movement during which a pair is idle. That pair is said to "sit out" that round.
Skip
An irregular feature of a Mitchell movement: typically a move by the East–West pairs of 2 tables up instead of the usual 1, to avoid them playing the same boards twice.
Skip bid warning, or skip-bid warning
A warning to LHO that one is about to make a jump bid that could cause a revealing hesitation or huddle; used only when bidding screens are not in place. The warning is made in one of two ways:
1) When bidding boxes are in use, the red Stop card is placed on the table followed by a bid card; LHO is expected to wait 10 seconds before taking action;
2) When bidding boxes are not in use, the jump bidder announces "I am about to make a skip bid, please wait." and then bids. LHO waits 10 seconds.
Slam
1) small slam (or simply, slam): a contract to win at least twelve tricks.
2) grand slam: a contract to win all thirteen tricks.
Bidding and making a slam or grand slam scores significant bonus points.
Slam try
A bid that invites partner to bid a slam.
Slot
(Slang) The location of a card that is onside. "In the slot" means "Finessable."
Slough
Discard. Pronounced and sometimes spelled "sluff".
Slow
Cards that require establishment before they can be cashed.
Slow arrival
A style of bidding that uses a jump to a contract (to which the previous bidding has already forced the partnership) to show a specific holding. Contrast Fast arrival.
Slow rubber
A rubber completed in three games. See fast rubber.
Sluff
See discard. Neo-orthography for slough, as used in ruff and sluff.
Smack
(Slang) Same meaning as crack.
Small slam
A contract for six odd tricks.
Smith signal
The Smith signal (also known as Smith echo or Smith peter) is an attitude carding signal in contract bridge showing additional values (or lack thereof) in the first suit led by the defence, while the signal itself is given in the first suit played by declarer.
Smolen
After opener has denied a four-card major in a Stayman sequence, responder's jump to 3M to show four cards in the bid major and five cards in the other major.
Smother play
An endplay that captures an opponent's guarded trump by means of an overruff, when that card cannot be finessed in the normal fashion.
Soft values
Lower honors, as distinct from aces and kings.
Solid
A suit strong enough to run without interruption, or (in the bidding) that requires no fit with partner.
Sort
To arrange one's cards by suit, and by rank within suit.
SOS redouble
A conventional redouble that asks partner for rescue from a doubled contract. Its name comes from the Morse code distress signal SOS.
Sound
A hand that is relatively strong for a call that is contemplated or that has been made.
South African Texas
A variant of Texas in which 4♣ and 4♦ are used as transfers to 4♥ and 4♠ respectively.
Splinter
A singleton or void in a suit other than the trump suit. A hand with both good support for partner's trumps and a splinter can be very powerful offensively—offering control of the splinter suit (by ruffing the first or second trick) and extra trump winners (by ruffing subsequent rounds). When declarer holds either no top honors or the ace and low cards opposite a splinter in the dummy, the combined hands may win several more tricks than the partnership might have expected without awareness of the powerful fit.
Splinter bid
An unusual jump bid that by agreement shows a fit for partner's last-bid suit and a singleton or void in the bid suit. For example, a partnership could treat 4♣ in response to an opening bid of 1♠ as a splinter bid, showing a good hand with spade support and a singleton or void club. Compare with Fragment bid.
Split
1) (Noun) The distribution in the opponents' hands of the cards in a suit.
2) (Verb) To play one of two touching honors when the lead comes through them.
Split menace
A menace in squeeze play which depends on values in both declarer's hand and dummy.
Split tenace
A position where the high cards of a tenace are in opposite hands, e.g. Ax opposite Qx; usually relevant only when a lead by an opponent with the missing honor card (here, the K) would be damaging to his side.
Sponsor
1) The organization that puts on a tournament, such as the WBF, the ACBL or the EBU, a regional association, or a club.
2) One who hires partners or teammates to compete in an event.
Spot card
A card that ranks below the 10.
Spread
(Slang) Laydown.
SPS
A Suit Preference Signal, a card played by a defender to show interest in or an entry in a side suit.
Squeeze
A playing technique that forces the defender to discard a vital card, usually an apparent stopper.
Squeeze card
A card whose lead forces one or both defenders to discard their guard in a suit.
Stack
A distribution of cards in defenders' hands that might make the play difficult for declarer. The defenders' trumps, for example, could be said to be stacked if they divide 5–0.
Standard American or Standard American Yellow Card (SAYC)
A bidding system thought to conform to agreements that an unfamiliar partnership in America would use.
Stationary
Not called to change seats during the movement being used.
Stayman convention
A conventional bid of 2♣ that calls for a 1NT opening bidder to bid a four-card major, if one is held, and (usually) 2♦ otherwise. Many continuations have been devised.
Steal
To gain an advantage, usually through deception. The theft may be material (e.g., a trick or a contract) or non-material (e.g., a tempo). Despite the term steal, deception is entirely legal if it does not involve unauthorized information or concealment of information to which the opponents are entitled.
Step
In the bidding, the space between one bid and the next highest. See Useful Space Principle.
Step bid
A bid that conveys information on the basis of the number of steps it uses.
Stolen bid
A bid that has no correlation to the bidder's hand, aiming to disturb conventions.
Stepping-stone squeeze
A squeeze that forces a defender either to be thrown in to act as a stepping-stone to a stranded dummy, or to allow declarer to establish a suit.
Sticks and wheels
(Slang, chiefly British) An 1100-point penalty. Compare "go for a number".
Stiff
(Slang, adjective and noun) A singleton.
Stop
An instruction given to opponents when you make a jump bid, or skip bid. LHO is expected to wait around 10 seconds before calling, so as to avoid communicating information to partner as to how easy his call is to make. See skip-bid warning.
Stopper
A high card (normally, an honor) whose primary function is to prevent the opponents from running a suit in a notrump contract. See also Control.
Strain
See denomination.
Strip
1) To remove safe cards of exit from an opponent's hand.
2) To prepare for a ruff-and-sluff by removing all cards of a suit (or suits) in a partnership's hands.
Strip squeeze
A squeeze without the count in which one threat is against a safe exit card.
Striped-tail ape double
A double of a laydown contract made in hope of dissuading the opponents from successfully bidding to a higher, more rewarding contract. The doubler must be prepared to run (like the cowardly ape) to an escape suit if the opponents redouble.
Strong club system
A set of conventions that uses an opening bid of 1♣ as an artificial, forcing opening that promises a strong hand.
Strong notrump
An opening notrump that shows a balanced hand and 15–17 or 16–18 HCP. Contrast Weak notrump. A partnership's choice between the use of a strong notrump or a weak notrump has extensive implications for its entire bidding system.
Strong pass system
A bidding system that mandates a pass by first (or second) hand to show what other systems would regard as an opening bid. A corollary is that if the next hand also passes, third (or fourth) hand must bid to keep the deal from being passed out.
Strong two bid, strong two-bid, or Strong Two
An agreement to use an opening bid of two of a suit to indicate a strong hand and a strong holding in the bid suit.
Stub
(Slang) Part-score.
Sucker double
(Slang) An ill-advised penalty double, such as one based on HCP when the bidding warns of freak distributions.
Suit
A ranked division of the deck of cards into (in descending rank order) spades, hearts, diamonds and clubs. The suit ranking has a profound effect on the bidding and scoring, but none at all on the play. See also Denomination, Major suit, and Minor suit).
Suit preference signal
A defensive carding method that signals a preference, or the lack thereof, for a suit other than the suit used for the signal.
Superaccept
A strongly encouraging response to a transfer, such as a jump completion (e.g., 1NT – 2♥; 3♠). Many partnerships use a conventional superacceptance such as 1NT – 2♦; 2♠, one step above responder's major, to save room for game or slam exploration, and in conformance with the Useful Space Principle.
Support
A fit with partner's suit.
Support double
A double of an overcall that shows a fit for partner's suit, usually distinguished from a direct raise by the length of the suit in responder's hand.
Sure trick
A trick that in the absence of some irregularity a player must win, such as the ace of trumps. Extended by George Coffin to refer to guaranteed lines of play.
Surrogate signals
A count or preference signal made in a different suit, usually the suit which declarer is running, to inform partner in beforehand about a critical decision he will have to make later during the play of the hand.
Swindle
A deceptive bid or play.
SWINE
A proxi-acronym for Sebesfi Woods 1NT Escape.
Swing
A difference in scores between two tables on a board in a team match.
Swinging
An aggressive playing style, usually adopted by a pair or team who is behind with some chance to catch the leaders "with a little luck." Swinging players will make plays slightly against the odds that will offer large gains if they succeed. For example, a swinging pair might bid a 60% grand slam on a hand where a small slam should be the normal contract. They might also make close doubles of normal contracts that might go down.
Swish
(Slang) Three consecutive passes, ending the auction. "3♠ – swish" means 3♠ passed out.
Swiss, or Swiss Teams
A Swiss-system tournament for teams-of-four. Every team plays a series of matches with a series of opponents whose records or standings are as similar as possible when they face each other, without scheduling repeat matches. Typically these are relatively numerous, relatively short matches. For example, of 54 to 56 boards in one day's play: 6, 7, 8, or 9 matches of 9, 8, 7, or 6 boards respectively.
Switch
To lead a different suit.
System
see bidding system.

== T ==
Table
1) (Noun) A grouping of four players at a bridge tournament.
2) (Verb) To put down one's cards face up.
3) See dummy (2).
Table card
A large printed card placed on a table in a bridge tournament. The card contains instructions for the players, including players' designations and board numbers. Also, "Guide card."
Table presence
Awareness of opponents' behavior and mannerisms, leading to inferences regarding their holdings and problems on a deal. It is improper to take action on inferences made on the basis of partner's behavior. Also, "Table feel."
Table talk
1) Improper communication between partners, effected by words, gestures, or facial expressions.
2) Extraneous discussion during the play, discouraged as a distraction or possible source of unauthorized information.
Takeout double
A conventional call used in a competitive auction to indicate support for the unbid suits in a hand of opening strength, and to request that partner bid. The classic, ideal pattern is 4–4–4–1, with the shortness in the suit doubled. There are many informatory doubles that anticipate a bid from partner, but "takeout double" typically refers to the double immediately over opening bidder.
Tank
(Slang) Huddle.
Tap
(Verb and noun) Slang. To adopt a line of defense that is intended to force declarer to ruff in the long hand. Also, the line of defense itself: "To get the tap going." See Forcing defense.
Team
1) (Adjective) (also Teams or Teams-of-four) A form of duplicate bridge played by eight people at two tables. The North–South pair at one table and East–West pair at the other table are teammates. Every deal is played at both tables ("duplicate") and scored by comparing the two raw scores — usually on the IMP or board-a-match scale. Matches are commonly played in sets of 6 to 20 deals, with scoring required and player substitutions permitted between sets.
2) (Noun) A group of four or more players who compete together in a teams event. For each deal, four team members are active at two tables. Player substitution occurs between matches or, in many longer matches, between sets of 6 to 20 deals. Most teams events permit four to six players on a team.
Teammate
A member of the same team. Commonly said of any teammate other than one's partner.
Teams
(Adjective) See team (1)
Tempo
1) Having the timing advantage in the play of the cards by possessing the lead and thereby being able to initiate (or continue) one's line of play before the declarer/opponents can establish his/theirs.
2) The speed at which a player executes a call or play. Some players attempt to intimidate less experienced opponents by playing their cards very quickly. A break in tempo often indicates that a player has an unexpected problem in bidding or play.
Temporizing bid
Waiting bid.
Tenace
A broken sequence of (often) honor cards, such as ♠AQ or ♦KJ. Declarer may lead toward his or dummy's tenace, preparing to finesse for a missing card. A defender may lead through declarer's or dummy's tenace to help his partner score cards behind the tenace.
Texas transfer, or Texas
A convention whereby a bid of 4♦ or 4♥ in response to a notrump bid requests partner to transfer to 4♥ or 4♠ respectively.
Their hand
(Slang) A hand on which the opponents have the preponderance of strength.
Thin
(Slang) 1) A bid or contract based on less strength than normally recommended.
2) (Of a hand) Lacking body.
Third-and-fifth
An opening lead convention that calls for the lead of the third-best card in a suit of up to four card length, and the fifth-best in a longer suit.
Third from even, low from odd
An opening lead convention that calls for the lead of the third-best card from a suit with an even number of cards, and the lowest card from a suit with an odd number of cards.
Third hand
The player who makes the third call, or who is the third to play to a trick.
Third hand high
A precept that advises the third hand to play a high card on partner's lead. See also Second hand low.
Third Way
A term for a bidding system combining 5-card majors and a weak no-trump, such as the Kaplan–Sheinwold system.
Threat
In squeeze play, a menace.
Three suiter
A hand with length in three suits, thus shortness in the fourth. Distributions such as 4–4–4–1, 5–4–4–0 and 5–4–3–1 are often termed "three-suiters."
Throw
To discard.
Throw-in
See Endplay.
Tight
(Slang) An honor card or honor sequence unaccompanied by low cards: "He had the ♥KQ tight."
Timing
A player's agenda for tasks in the play of the hand: for example, ruff losers and then draw trumps; or, draw trumps and then run the side suit.
Top
Playing matchpoints, the highest score achieved on a board.
Top of nothing
The lead of a high spot card from a suit that contains no honor card.
Top trick
A card that can take a trick on a given hand. See Winner.
Total tricks
The sum of the number of tricks that each partnership can take, with its longest combined suit as trump. See Law of Total tricks.
Touching
Adjacent. Both cards and suits may be touching. In the holding ♣KQ5, the king and queen are touching. In deciding whether to respond Up the line, a player notes that hearts and spades are touching suits.
Tournament
An organized duplicate bridge competition.
Trance
(Slang) Huddle.
Transfer
A bid that conventionally shows length in a suit other than the one bid, or requests partner to make a bid in a particular suit, or both. The suit in question is usually the suit immediately above the one bid. Examples: Jacoby transfers (often just called "transfers") and Texas transfers ("Texas"). Also, see transfer a control.
Transferable values
Cards, such as aces and kings, that are valuable either in declarer's hands or in defenders'.
Transfer a control
In squeeze play, to shift the responsibility of controlling, or guarding, a menace from one opponent to the other. This is usually accomplished by playing through one opponent in a way that forces him to cover the lead, leaving the other opponent with the remaining control. The purpose is to arrange that one opponent has to guard more menaces than he can successfully manage.
Transnational
1) A pair or team whose members differ in "nationality". Typically they are members of different national bridge federations, thus registered players.
2) An event (tournament) that permits transnational pairs or teams to enter. A transnational event is open in sense (c).
Trap pass
See Sandbag.
Traveller
A type of score slip on which the result of a deal is recorded for the purpose of comparative scoring. Used in certain event formats, it is folded, placed into the board and 'travels' with it to the next table. May also be referred to as a travelling slip or travelling score sheet. Contrast Pick-up slip.
Tray
See Board.
Treatment
A natural bid that: (1) either shows a willingness to play in the denomination named, or promises or requests values in that denomination, and (2) by partnership agreement gives or requests additional information on which action could be based. If the treatment is an unusual one, it requires announcement to the opponents even though it is natural. For example, a partnership that plays Flannery usually agrees that a 1♠ response to a 1♥ opening bid shows five spades. So the 1♠ response to 1♥, while natural, is a treatment because by agreement it shows at least a five card suit. Compare with Convention, in the auction a call that gives or requests information not necessarily related to the denomination named.
Trebleton
A tripleton.
Trial bid
See game try.
Trial
A (usually, high-level) tournament whose winners proceed to a subsequent event of even greater import.
Trick
A set of four cards played by each player in turn, during the play of a hand.
Trick score
The score earned by contracting for and taking tricks. Trick scores count toward making a game.
Triple squeeze
A squeeze that is so-named because it consists of three simple squeezes against the same opponent. A Progressive squeeze is regarded as a triple squeeze (because it is initiated by one), but not all triple squeezes are progressive.
Tripleton
A holding of three cards in a suit.
Trump
1) (Noun) A card in the trump suit whose trick-taking power is greater than any plain suit card.
2) (Verb) To play a trump after a plain suit has been led; see Ruff.
Trump control
The ability, from a combination of the holding in trumps with play technique, to prevent the opponents from taking too many tricks in a plain suit.
Trump echo
An echo in the trump suit, long used to alert partner to the possibility of a defensive ruff, and in the early 21st century to give partner the count.
Trump promotion
The advancement of a trump to the status of a winner by creating a position in which an opponent must suffer an uppercut, or an immediate adverse overruff, or choose to ruff with a higher trump that makes a later winner of an opponent's trump by force of cards.
Trump squeeze
A squeeze that forces an opponent to weaken his holding in one of the threat suits enough that the suit can later be ruffed out.
Trump suit, or simply "trumps"
By way of the auction, declarer and declarer's partner select the trump suit on the basis of their combined length and strength in the suit: the greater length to ruff more losers in the plain suits, and the greater strength to better control the play of the trump suit itself. Information about trump suits generally in other card games can be found here.
Two club system, or Two clubs system
A bidding system that uses an opening bid of 2♣ as an artificial game force.
Two over one, Two-over-one, or 2-over-1 (2/1)
1. a bidding sequence in which after a one-level opening bid, there is a non-jump response at the two-level.
2. a bidding system based upon the concept that after a one-level opening bid in a suit, a non-jump response by an unpassed hand at the two-level is forcing to game.
Contrast One over one.
Two-suiter
A hand containing two long suits, usually each containing 4 or more cards, with at least 10 cards between the two suits.
Two-way checkback
An inquiry made after opener rebids 1NT. 2♣ is a puppet to 2♦ (forces a response of 2♦ by the 1NT rebidder) which says nothing about responder's strain. It is just a forcing bid to show an invitational hand. On the other hand, a rebid of 2♦ after a 1NT rebid is an artificial game force.
Two-way Drury
An inquiry about the third (or sometimes fourth) position opener's strength in a major suit. 2♣ shows 3-card support, while an inquiry made with 2♦ shows four cards in opener's suit.
Two-way finesse
A finesse that could be taken through either opponent.
Two-way Stayman
Over an opening bid of 1NT, the use of 2♣ as non-forcing Stayman and 2♦ as a game-forcing major suit inquiry.

== U ==
UI
Unauthorized information.
Unauthorized information
Information obtained from partner that one is not permitted to act on: for example, the manner in which partner plays a particular card, or the tone of voice when making a bid.
Unbalanced distribution
1) Broadly, any distribution of a hand or suit other than 4–3–3–3, 4–4–3–2 or 5–3–3–2.
2) Unbalanced is commonly used in a narrow sense that excludes semi-balanced, 5–4–2–2 and 6–3–2–2. Narrowly, unbalanced distribution implies a void, singleton, or 7-card suit.
Unbalanced hand
A 13-card hand with unbalanced distribution in the broad or narrow sense just above.
Unbid suit
A suit that has neither been bid nor indirectly shown.
Unblock
To play a card whose rank interferes with the use of cards in the opposite hand. Opposite dummy's KQJ, declarer's singleton ace blocks the suit, and so is played to unblock. There are other situations that require unblocking, such as the Vienna coup.
Under
See In front of.
Underbid
1) (Verb) To bid less aggressively, or to a lower contract, than most would with the same cards.
2) (Noun) A bid that most would regard as weaker than warranted by the strength of the hand.
Underlead
To lead a low card when holding the top card or cards in a suit. The underlead is standard in defense of notrump contracts (so as to preserve communications between defenders' hands), but unusual against suit contracts.
Underruff
To play a trump lower than one already played on the lead of a plain suit. Usually this is undesirable but is sometimes necessary to adjust the number of trumps held while preparing a trump coup, or while preparing to defend certain squeezed positions.
Undertrick
A trick that declarer does not win, causing the contract to go down. Multiple undertricks occur: for example, two undertricks could result in 4♥ down two.
Unfinished rubber
A rubber that the players agree not to finish. In rubber bridge scoring, a 300-point bonus is given to a vulnerable side, and a 100-point bonus to a side with a part score – note this differs from the 50 points for a part score in duplicate bridge.
Unguard
To discard lower cards that help prevent a higher card from being captured by an opponent.
Unlimited bid
See wide-ranging bid.
UPH
Unpassed hand.
Unplayable
1) (Of a contract) Unable to be played so as to bring about a favorable outcome.
2) (Of an agreement) Inevitably bringing about undesirable bidding sequences or contracts.
Unusual notrump
An artificial jump overcall in notrump that shows a Two-suiter, usually bid to suggest a sacrifice. As originally played, 1M – (2NT) showed a hand weak in high cards with, probably, 5–5 in the minor suits.
Unusual over unusual (OUO), or Unusual vs. unusual
A conventional method of conveying information after the opponents have deployed the unusual notrump convention or a Michaels Cue Bid, also called Unusual vs. Unusual.
UOU
Acronym or initialism for Unusual over unusual
Up the line
To bid the lower of two adjacent suits before the higher. For example, of two four card majors, the heart suit is normally bid before the spade suit in response to an opening bid of 1♣ or 1♦.
Uppercut
To ruff in the expectation of being overruffed, when the overruff will cause a trump in partner's hand to become a winner.
Upside-down signals
An agreement that when following suit to partner's lead, a low card encourages a continuation and a high card discourages. This is "upside-down", or the reverse of traditional practice.
USBC
United States Bridge Championships, competitions sponsored by the USBF in which entries compete to represent the United States in world tournaments. The USBC are teams-of-four tournaments that determine "USA" open, women, and senior teams. Sometimes the USBC winner and runner-up both qualify, as teams "USA1" and "USA2".
USBF
United States Bridge Federation, the association charged with national representation of the United States in international competition. Contrast ACBL.
Useful space principle
A guide to developing bidding conventions and treatments that directs developers' attention to the allocation of bidding space.

== V ==
VCB
Variable Cue Bidding. Agreements used in the Ultimate Club to request and show controls.
Vanderbilt Club
A bidding system devised by Harold S. Vanderbilt and published by him in 1929, the first strong club system.
Variable notrump
The use of a weak notrump when not vulnerable and a strong notrump when vulnerable.
Victory points (VP)
A conversion scale used in team contests and based on total IMP differences, so as to reduce the effect of very large swings.
Vienna coup
The unblock of a winner opposite a threat prior to reaching a position that effects a squeeze.
Vienna System
A bidding system devised by Austrian player Paul Stern in the 1930s, in which an opening bid of 1NT is artificial and shows a strong hand.
View
An assumption about how the cards lie on a particular deal: "Sorry, partner, I took a view."
Void
No cards in a given suit.
Voidwood
See Exclusion Blackwood.
Vugraph, or viewgraph
A method of visually displaying tournament bridge deals to spectators, by optical or electronic means.
Vulnerability
The scoring condition of each pair in advance of a deal. In duplicate bridge and Chicago, vulnerability is pre-determined for each board or deal; in rubber bridge, it is determined by the number of games completed in the rubber. Vulnerability affects both the size of bonuses for making contracts and penalties for failing to make them.
Vulnerable
1) (Duplicate bridge) A designation, shown on each board, that indicates whether larger bonuses and penalties apply to one, both or neither pair on that deal.
2) (Rubber bridge) Having won one game.

== W ==
Waiting bid
A bid that enables the bidder to obtain more information before making a commitment. For example, some players use 2♦ over a 2♣ forcing opening bid as a waiting bid rather than as a negative response.
Waive
To condone an irregularity. In duplicate bridge, a waiver is an improper action.
Wash
(Slang) Push.
Wasted values
Duplicated values.
WBF
World Bridge Federation.
Weak jump overcall
A jump overcall used to preempt the bidding.
Weak jump shift
A jump shift used to preempt the bidding.
Weak notrump
A 1NT opening bid on a balanced hand with, usually, 12–14 HCP. The bid has mild preemptive value; contrast Strong notrump. To show a strong notrump, the weak notrump user opens with a suit and rebids in notrump.
Weak suit game try
Following a major suit raise to the two level, the weak suit game try names a suit with at least three cards and at least two losers where partner's short suit is likely to be useful, as will a strong suit. Three small cards is ideal.
2) Alternative term for a help suit game try. In some usage the "help suit game try" is barely distinguishable from the long, in some barely distinguishable from the weak.
Weak two bid, weak two-bid, or Weak Two
An opening bid of two of a suit to indicate a relatively weak hand with a long suit.
Whist
A trick-taking card game and predecessor to contract bridge.
Wholesale
A count or total that obscures cards' identities. A bid of 5♥ in response to Blackwood shows two aces wholesale, without announcing which aces they are.
Wide open
(Said of a suit) Without a stopper.
Wide-ranging bid
A bid made within a wide range of strengths and shapes, the opposite of a limit bid. An example from Acol is an opening bid of one of a suit which may be made with anything from 10 HCP (plus some shape) to 22 HCP (with a shape unsuitable for a 2 bid, such as 4–4–4–1). Such bids are limited only by the failure of the bidder to make a stronger or weaker bid; thus an Acol opening bid of one of a suit is limited by the fact that the opener failed to pass, to make a 2 level opening bid, or to make a pre-emptive opening bid.
Winkle
A squeeze without the count that forces the defender to choose between a throw-in and an unblock, each of which is a losing option.
Winner
A card that can take a trick on a given hand.
Wire
(Slang) Improper knowledge of a deal, prior to playing it.
World Bridge Federation (WBF)
The world sport governing body for bridge. Its members are more than 120 national bridge federations that are grouped in eight geographic zones for some purposes. It sponsors competitions including but not limited to world championships, which exclusively convey the title "world champion".
WBU
Welsh Bridge Union.
Wolff signoff
After a jump rebid of 2NT by opener, responder's bid of 3♣ as a puppet to 3♦, after which responder can sign off with a weak hand.
Woo twos
A synonym or close variant of the Muiderberg convention, a weak two-bid showing 5 cards in a major and at least four cards in another suit.
Work count, or Work points
The assignment of the numbers 4, 3, 2 and 1 as points to represent aces, kings, queens and jacks in the process of hand evaluation. Named for Milton Work.
Working card
A card that is useful to a partnership, given the mesh of the cards in the two hands.
Wrongside
(Verb) To place the contract in the less favorable hand for the partnership. See Antipositional.

== X ==
x
(lowercase) Any small card, of no trick-taking significance.
X
(uppercase) Double, in print or manuscript representation of the auction (where alternatives are "D", "Dbl", etc.) or the final contract. Used in bidding boxes, private scores, and occasionally elsewhere.
XX
(uppercase) Redouble, in print or manuscript representation of the auction (where alternatives are "R", "Rdbl", etc.) or the final contract. Used in bidding boxes, private scores, and occasionally elsewhere.
X-IMPs
Cross-IMPs.
XYZ
A convention used in an uncontested auction where 3 suits are bid at the one level. Thereafter a 2♣ is a puppet to 2♦, showing a weak ♦ or an invitational hand. A 2♦ bid is game forcing. A 3♣ shows a weak hand.
XY Notrump
A convention to be used after a sequence like 1X – 1Y – 1NT. Thereafter a 2♣ is a puppet to 2♦, showing a weak ♦ or an invitational hand. A 2♦ bid is game forcing. Also called XY Checkback.
XYZ Notrump
A convention to be used after a sequence like 1X – 1Y – (1Z) – 1NT, or 1X – (1Z) – 1Y – 1NT, where 1Z is an opponent's bid. Thereafter a 2♣ is a puppet to 2♦, showing a weak ♦ or an invitational hand. A 2♦ bid is game forcing. Also called XYZ Checkback.

== Y ==
Yarborough
Originally, a hand with no card higher than a nine. The British Earl of Yarborough, during the 19th century, would offer a wager of £1,000 to £1 against picking up such a hand at whist. (The actual odds against such a hand are approximately 1,827 to 1.) In common usage, it may refer to a very weak hand.

== Z ==
z
see Zoom.
Zar points
An evaluation method to determine if a hand should be opened. It asks to open whenever you have 26 or more Zars, determined by adding the number of cards in the 2 longest suits, plus high card points, plus number of controls (A=2, K=1), plus the difference between the longest and the shortest suit. An additional point is added for the ♠ suit if it has 4+ cards. The unsupported honors are diminished 1 point in value. 52 Zar points should produce a NT or major suit game.
Zero
The lowest score obtained on a deal in a pairs game. Also, bottom.
Zia play
A specific type of falsecard which creates a losing option to declarer.
Zone
One of eight geographic zones in which World Bridge Federation member "nations" are grouped for some purposes. The WBF was founded August 1958 by delegates from Europe, North America, and South America, which are now Zones 1 to 3. World championship teams-of-four competition has been organized zonally even longer: the Bermuda Bowl was contested in one long match between representatives of Europe and North America from 1951 (the second rendition) to 1957; in a three-team round robin including the champion of South America for 1958. From 2005 to present, there are 22 teams in zonally organized world championship tournaments. See Senior Bowl: Structure and Zones and nations.
Zonal organizations mediate between the world and national levels in some respects. In Zone 1 for instance, the European Bridge League is the zonal organization. Its members are the national bridge federations of 46 countries from Albania to Wales, and geographically from Iceland to Israel. In Zone 2, on the other hand, bridge players are members of the American Contract Bridge League.
Zoom (z)
In a relay system, the facility to joining into the next level of answers without needing to hear a new relay from partner. Usually, after servant has the highest possible answer for the level s/he is answering, s/he can jump into the next level assuming the captain made a virtual new relay, saving bidding space.

== See also ==
- Glossary of card game terms
