= Neuberg formula =

Match pointing scores formula

In duplicate bridge pairs tournaments, the Neuberg formula is a method of adjusting match point scores achieved on boards which have been played fewer times than other boards. Originally developed by Gérard Neuberg of France, its objective is to achieve a formula for the final score of every pair to which each hand they have played contributes with equal weight.

Although the objective behind the formula is of questionable soundness, the formula itself follows from well-defined mathematical assumptions, and is almost universally applied in computer-scored bridge tournaments.

A board might have been played fewer times than others because:

- the movement was not completed, or
- there was a phantom pair, or
- one or more plays of that board had to be cancelled because of irregularities, entailing explicit percentage assignments for those plays.

== Details ==
The method is:

- Add 1 to the number of match points scored. (If the North American match point system is in use, where each comparison is worth one point rather than two, add a half-point instead.)
- Multiply by the number of times the board should have been played (this should be the same number for all the boards in the tournament) and divide by the number of times it was actually played.
- Then subtract 1 (or ½, whichever was added above).

== Example ==
- Board played 6 times.
- Most other boards played 7 times.
- Pair X scored 4 match points (out of 10).
- Then (4+1) x (7/6) - 1 = 4.8333 (out of 12).
- Pair Y scored 9 match points (out of 10).
- Then (9+1) x (7/6) - 1 = 10.6667 (out of 12).
- The scores are usually then rounded to the nearest 0.1, so 4.8 and 10.7 respectively.

== Criticisms ==
- Mistaken objective: No a priori reason to give equal weight to boards played fewer times.

A result achieved by a pair on a board played fewer times is a less reliable, higher variance, estimate of the pair's performance than a result achieved on a board played more times. It is baseless to suggest that giving the less-played board an equal contribution increases fairness; in fact it has the opposite effect, making it more likely for a pair to win or lose the event by chance, rather than skill.
The typical example used to explain the need for the Neuberg approach involves comparing two pairs, whose results only differ with respect to one hand. On this single hand, Pair A competes against 10 other pairs and beats them all, whereas pair B competes against 50 other pairs, beating 33 and losing to 17. The non-Neuberg approach, of comparing each pair with the maximum they could have achieved, results in pair 'B' achieving a higher final score than pair 'A'.

Pair 'B's victory is, in fact, the only fair outcome, since, in the referenced example, pair 'B' has beaten a higher proportion of opposing scores (533/1050) than pair 'A' (510/1010) has. Nonetheless, the documents advocating Neuberg formula portray this outcome as unfair, for reasons that they do not carefully express. Applying the Neuberg formula puts pair 'A' first, which is actually not fair.

It is unclear whether Gérard Neuberg actually believed that applying the Neuberg formula increased fairness, or if the formulation was merely an exercise to find the best possible protocol for scaling Matchpoints in a theoretical situation where one wanted each board to contribute equally, for whatever reason.

- Failure to account for diverse partnership strengths.

If you play a board, and a different play of the same board was cancelled involving a weak pair that you would probably have beaten, the Neuberg formula does not compensate you for your cancelled (presumed) victory. However, it compensates you had the different play of the board involved a stronger pair that would have probably beaten you.

- Rounding

The rounding method means that two pairs with the same total unrounded scores can end up with different total rounded scores, and be ranked accordingly. This is not that unusual. The solution is to round the total scores, not the per-board scores.

== Gérard Neuberg ==
The formula was developed by Gérard Neuberg, a French mathematician. He died at the end of 2016: there is a brief obituary in the French Bridge Federation magazine (January 2017) .

== Other uses ==
The formula can also be used for example in a club competition when it is desired to give equal weight to scores achieved over a number of sessions, but there were different numbers of tables at each session.
