= Smith signal =

Contract bridge code signal

The Smith signal (also known as Smith echo or Smith Peter) is an attitude carding signal in contract bridge showing additional values (or lack thereof) in the first suit led by the defence, while the signal itself is given in the first suit played by declarer.

== Example ==
	♠ 7 3	
♠ A 10 9 5 4	W N↑ S↓ E	♠ Q J 2
	♠ K 8 6	

Against a 3NT contract, West leads the spade five to East's jack and declarer's king. Declarer then attacks diamonds to establish the suit and West wins the ace on the second round. Playing the Smith Peter signal, East plays high-low to show the queen of spades; if East had not held the queen, he would have played low-high in diamonds.

There are several variations, depending on partnerships agreement, as to exactly when this signal applies. It can be played either against notrump contracts only, or against all contracts. It can be used by both players, or used only by the opener, or used only by his partner. Alternatively, it can be played "upside-down" -- i.e. low-high shows values in the opening-lead suit, while high-low denies it.
