= Stolen bid =

Type of bid in contract bridge

Within contract bridge a stolen bid is a bid which usually lacks connection to the bidders own hand, and instead is used for blocking a certain bid (or a range of several bids) to be expressed from the next opponent. To "steal a bid" is mainly done when the opponent to the right has given a conventional bid which the opponent to the left is likely to reply to. By far, most stolen bids are related to the Stayman convention. But also other conventions where some kind of reply is expected, the "reply range" can at least in theory be stolen. Blackwood is another example of a convention that might be exposed to a stolen bid.

== Example ==
This example is from a 29 table duplicate tournament. Neither side is vulnerable, South is dealer.

South: ♠ 7 6 2 ♥ A Q ♦ K 8 6 ♣ Q J 10 8 4

Auction went:

West	North	East	South
			1♣
1NT	Pass	2♣	2♠
Pass	Pass	Double	3♣
Pass	Pass	Pass	

South's second bid - 2 ♠ - obviously lacks any actual connection to the hand. After South's 1 ♣ opening, West overcalls with 1 NT, which shows a stopper in ♣ and a balanced hand and 15-17 hcp. North has nothing to say and East now uses the Stayman convention. (East wishes to know if West possibly has one or two four card majors - or none at all) But through South's 2 ♠ West's possible replies 2 ♦ (= no four card major), 2 ♥ (= four cards in Hearts) and 2 ♠ (= four cards in Spades) cannot be used. West decides to pass. After Easts double, South can now return to his best suit ♣.

This deal was played at 29 tables, and at this table the result was one penalty or 50 points to East-West. But this turned out to be the top North-South result - 100%. At the second best tables (of which there were 13 of) the result was 140 points to East-West, indicating a successful contract of 3 ♥ or 3 ♠. At two tables East-West even scored a 420 points game.

West's hand: ♠ Q J 8 ♥ K 10 ♦ Q 9 7 5 ♣ A K 7 5

North's hand ♠ 9 4 ♥ J 8 7 6 5 ♦ A 4 3 ♣ 6 3 2

East's hand ♠ A K 10 5 3 ♥ 9 4 3 2 ♦ J 10 2 ♣ 9
