= Force (disambiguation) =

In physics, force is what, when unopposed, changes the motion of an object.

Force is also a dialectal term for a "waterfall".

Force or forces may also refer to:

== Places ==
- Force, Marche, a municipality in Ascoli Piceno, Italy
- Forcé, Mayenne, France; a commune
- Force, Pennsylvania, an unincorporated community in Pennsylvania
- Fundy Ocean Research Centre for Energy, tidal power test site in Nova Scotia

== People ==
- Anna Laura Force (1868-1952), American educator
- The Force family of American drag racing:
  - John Force (born 1949), family patriarch; father of four daughters, three of whom are or have been racers themselves:
    - Ashley Force Hood (born 1982)
    - Brittany Force (born 1986)
    - Courtney Force (born 1988)

== Arts, entertainment, and media ==
=== Fictional entities ===
- Force (comics), a character in the Marvel Comics Iron Man titles
- Major Force, a fictional character in the DC Comics universe

=== Films ===
- Force (film series), a series of Indian Hindi-language action-thriller films
  - Force (2011 film), first installment of the series
  - Force 2 (2016), second installment of the series
- Force (2014 film), an Indian Bengali-language film

=== Music ===
- Force, the early name of the Swedish band Europe
- Force (A Certain Ratio album), 1986
- Force (Superfly album), 2012
  - "Force" (Superfly song)
- "Force" (Alan Walker song), 2015

=== Other uses in arts, entertainment, and media ===
- Forcing (magic), a magician's technique sometimes called a "force"
- Sonic Forces, a video game
- FORCE (Villains and Vigilantes), a 1982 adventure for the role-playing game Villains and Vigilantes

== Law, policing, and military ==
- Force (law), unlawful violence or lawful compulsion
- Forces, the armed forces collectively of a nation's military
  - Security forces, the name of the armed forces in some nations
- The force, the police force of a particular jurisdiction

== Mathematics and science ==
- Brute force method, proof by exhaustion in mathematics
- Fundamental force, an interaction between particles that cannot be explained by other interactions

== Sports ==
=== Teams ===
- Cleveland Force (disambiguation), defunct indoor soccer teams based in Northeast Ohio
- Georgia Force, an Arena Football League team
- Ipswich Force, an Australian basketball team
- Kansas City Force, an American women's gridiron football team
- San Antonio Force, an Arena Football League team that played during the 1992 season
- Western Force, an Australian rugby union team in the Super 14

=== Other ===
- FORCE (Formula One Race Car Engineering), a design and construction company within the Haas Lola Formula One team
- Force play, a situation in baseball where the runner is compelled to advance to the next base

== Other uses ==
- Force (cereal), a wheat flake cereal
- Coming into force
- Force Motors, an Indian automotive company
- Force-feeding, the practice of feeding a human or other animal against their will
- Fuerza (political party) (English translation: Force), a political party in Guatemala

== See also ==
- Armed forces (disambiguation)
- Brute force (disambiguation)
- Elite Force (disambiguation)
- Energy (disambiguation)
- Force 1 (disambiguation)
- Force 10 (disambiguation)
- Force B (disambiguation)
- Force Commander (disambiguation)
- Force field (disambiguation)
- Force majeure (disambiguation)
- Force of Nature (disambiguation)
- Force One (disambiguation)
- Force XXI (disambiguation)
- Forcing (disambiguation)
- Special forces (disambiguation)
- Taskforce (disambiguation)
- X force (disambiguation)
