= Forcing =

Forcing may refer to:

== Mathematics and science ==
- Forcing (mathematics), a technique for obtaining independence proofs for set theory
- Forcing (computability), a modification of Paul Cohen's original set theoretic technique of forcing to deal with the effective concerns in recursion theory
- Forcing (horticulture), bringing a cultivated plant into growth outside of its natural season.
- Forcing, driving a harmonic oscillator at a particular frequency
- Cloud forcing, the difference between the radiation budget components for average cloud conditions and cloud-free conditions
- Forcing bulbs, the inducement of plants to flower earlier than their natural season
- Radiative forcing, the difference between the incoming radiation energy and the outgoing radiation energy in a given climate system

== Arts, entertainment, and media ==
- Forcing (magic), a technique by which a magician forces one outcome from a card draw
- Forcing, several distinct concepts within the game of contract bridge:
  - Forcing bid
  - Forcing defense
  - Forcing notrump
  - Forcing pass
  - Forcing take-out, an obsolete name for a strong jump shift; see Glossary of contract bridge terms#forcingtakeout
  - Fourth suit forcing

== See also ==
- Force (disambiguation)
- Forcing function (disambiguation page)
