= Force G =

Force G may refer to:

== Physics ==
- gravity
- g-force

== Military ==
- Indian Expeditionary Force G in WW1 at Gallipoli
- Force G (1939), the WW2 joint French-British naval taskforce for hunting down German cruiser Admiral Graf Spee
- Force G (1941), the former name of Force Z, WW2 British Royal Navy taskforce defending Singapore and Malaya
- Assault Force G (1944), the WW2 forces in Operation Neptune (D-Day) assigned to attack Gold Beach
- 12th Cruiser Squadron, also known as Cruiser Force G, British Royal Navy unit active in WW1 and WW2

== See also ==
- G-force (disambiguation)
- Force (disambiguation)
- G (disambiguation)
