= Z Force =

Z Force, force z, or variation, may refer to:

== Military ==
- Z Force (Bangladesh), a guerrilla unit during the Bangladesh Liberation War
- Z Force (Burma), an intelligence-gathering unit of the British Fourteenth Army in Burma
- Z Special Unit, an Australian-British-New Zealand commando unit in the South West Pacific theatre, also known as "Z Force"
- Force Z of the Royal Navy in WWII
- Z (military symbol), prominent and standard label for Russian forces during the 2022 Russian Invasion of Ukraine

== Other uses ==
- Flashback (Six Flags Magic Mountain), a roller coaster previously known as Z-Force

== See also ==
- Force (disambiguation)
- X force (disambiguation)
- Y Force
- Z (disambiguation)
