= Force majeure (disambiguation) =

Force majeure (French; literally, “superior force”) is a common clause in contracts that frees parties from legal obligation when an extraordinary event or circumstance occurs.

Force Majeure may also refer to:

== Arts, entertainment, and media ==
=== Literature ===
- Force Majeure, a 2007 novel by Daniel O'Mahony
- Force Majeure, a 1991 novel by Bruce Wagner

=== Music ===
- Force Majeure (band), an English new wave group, formed in 1983
- Force Majeure (Delivery album), 2025
- Force Majeure (Doro album), 1989
- Force Majeure (H.E.A.T album), 2022
- Force Majeure (Tangerine Dream album), 1979
- Force Majeure, a single from the 2021 album Escapades (Gaspard Augé)

=== Television ===
- "Force Majeure" (Millennium), the thirteenth episode of the first season of the American crime-thriller television series Millennium
- "Force Majeure" (The Unit), an episode of the television series The Unit
- "Force Majeure" (Under the Dome), the third episode of the second season of the CBS drama series Under the Dome

=== Other uses in arts, entertainment, and media ===
- Force majeure, a 1989 film by French director Pierre Jolivet
- Force Majeure (dance company), an Australian contemporary dance collective
- Force Majeure (film), a 2014 Swedish film
- Force Majeure (tour), the title of comedian Eddie Izzard's 2013 world tour

== Other uses ==
- Force Majeure Vineyards (wine), a boutique winery in Washington state

== See also ==
- Act of God
- Force (disambiguation)
- Major Force
- Natural disaster
