= G force (disambiguation) =

The g-force associated with an object is its acceleration relative to free-fall.

G-force may also refer to:

== Arts and entertainment ==
- G Force, a 1983 album by Kenny G
- G-Force (film), a 2009 live-action film by Disney
  - G-Force (video game), a 2009 video game based on the film
- G-Force, a group from Battle of the Planets
- G-Force: Guardians of Space, the second English adaptation of Gatchaman, following Battle of the Planets
- "G-Force", a song by Sonic Youth, from The Whitey Album
- G-Force (album), a 1980 album by the band of the same name led by Gary Moore
- G-Force (dance group), a dance group in the Philippines associated with ASAP 2012
- G-Force (Godzilla), a fictional military organization tasked with the monitoring of Godzilla

== Technology ==
- G-Force Technologies, a racing car constructor, now owned by Élan Motorsport Technologies
- G-Force, a guitar effects processor by TC Electronic
- G Force (Dyson), a vacuum cleaner by Dyson
- G Force (roller coaster), a roller coaster at Drayton Manor Theme Park

== See also ==
- GeForce, a graphics card brand name of Nvidia
- G-Force One, parabolic flight aircraft of 'Zero-G' weightless flight airline
- Force G (disambiguation)
- Force (disambiguation)
- G (disambiguation)
