= Force 10 =

Force 10 may refer to:

- Force 10 from Navarone (novel), a World War II novel by Scottish author Alistair MacLean published in 1968
- Force 10 from Navarone (film), a war film based on the novel
- Force 10 on the Beaufort scale of wind speed
- Force Ten, a model of tent made by British firm Vango
- Gull Force 10, a fuel brand in New Zealand
- Force10, an American computer networking company
- Force 10, a variation of the Paratrooper amusement ride
- "Force Ten" (song), a song by Rush from Hold Your Fire
