= Delivery (Australian band) =

Australian garage-punk band

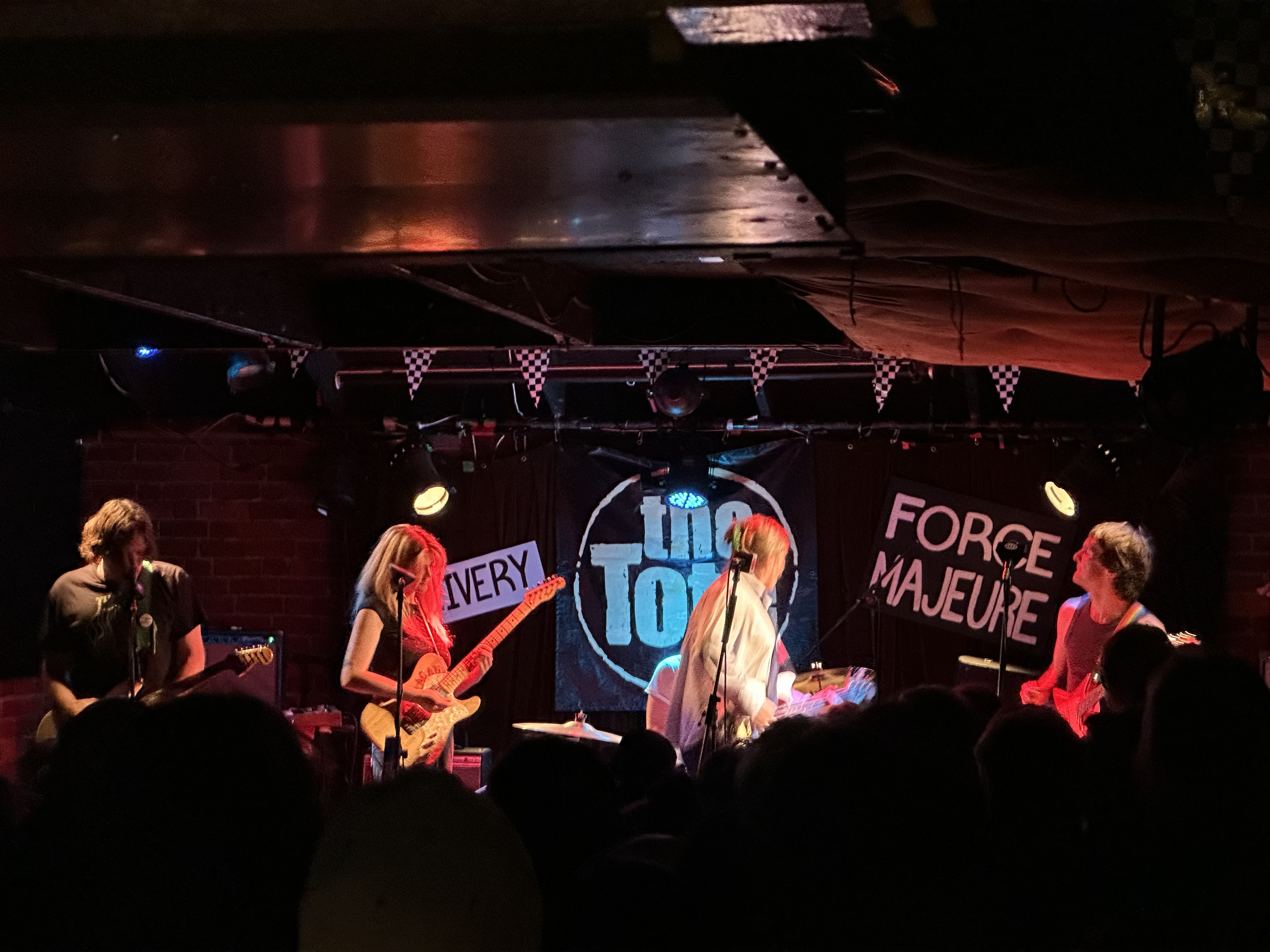
- Delivery playing at The Tote Hotel in April 2025

Background information
- Origin: Melbourne, Victoria, Australia
- Genres: Garage punk
- Years active: 2020–present
- Labels: Heavenly Recordings; [PIAS]; Spoilsport (AU); Anti Fade (NZ); Feel It (US & EU)
- Members: Rebecca Allan; James Lynch; Scarlett Maloney; Jordan Oakley; Liam Kenny
- Past members: Seamus Whelan; Sam Harding; Lisa Rashleigh; Daniel Devlin

Delivery is an Australian garage-punk band formed in 2020. They released their debut album, Forever Giving Handshakes, in November 2022.

== History ==
Delivery were formed in 2020 by couple Rebecca Allan and James Lynch and included members from several Melbourne bands, including The Vacant Smiles, Gutter Girls and Blonde Revolver. They played their first live show in March 2021.

In June 2021, the group released their debut EP Yes We Do.

Between January and April 2022, the group recorded songs for their debut album. In September 2022, the band released the lead single, "Baader Meinhof".

In October, the band released the single "The Complex" and announced the forthcoming released of their debut album Forever Giving Handshakes.

Doug Wallen from NME gave the album 4 out of 5 calling it "[a] lively record full of guitar interplay and sociopolitical critique". Conor Lochrie from Tone Deaf said "Forever Giving Handshakes is an exercise in controlled chaos, songs threatening to fall apart at any moment, but it all coolly remains together" adding "Underneath the rapid-fire vocal delivery, intricate guitar interplay is rife; it's always a case of more is more."

Delivery played Golden Plains Festival in Meredith, Australia in March 2023.

== Members ==
=== Current members ===
- Rebecca Allan – bass, backing and lead vocals (2020–present)
- James Lynch – lead and backing vocals, guitar, synthesizer (2020–present)
- Jordan Oakley – guitar, backing vocals (2024–present)
- Scarlett Maloney – guitar, backing and lead vocals (2024–present)
- Liam Kenny – drums (2024–present)

=== Former members ===
- Seamus Whelan – guitar, backing vocals (2020–2021)
- Lisa Rashleigh – guitar, backing and lead vocals (2020–2024)
- Daniel Devlin – drums, backing vocals (2020–2024)
- Sam Harding – guitar, synthesizer, backing vocals (2021–2024)

== Discography ==
=== Albums ===
List of albums, with selected details and chart positions
Title	Details	Peak chart positions
Title	Details	AUS
Forever Giving Handshakes	Released: 11 November 2022; Format: LP, digital; Label: Spoilsport (AU) / Anti Fade (NZ) / Feel It (US & EU)	– (Note: "Forever Giving Handshakes" did not enter the ARIA Top 50 Album Chart, but peaked at number 20 on the Australian Artists Album Chart.)
Force Majeure	Released: 17 January 2025; Format: LP, digital; Label: Heavenly / [PIAS]	TBA

=== Extended plays ===
List of EPs, with selected details
Title	Details
Yes We Do	Released: 25 June 2021; Format: LP (150 copies), digital; Label: Spoilsport Records (SSR018)
