= Force One =

Force One or Force 1 may refer to:

== Automobiles ==
- Force One (sport utility vehicle), a 2011–2016 Indian mid-size SUV
- VLF Force 1, a 2016–present American sports car

== Military ==
- Force One (Mumbai Police), an armed force

== See also ==
- Force (disambiguation)
- One (disambiguation)
- A Force of One, a 1979 American martial-arts film
- Force I (letter-I), a World War II British Royal Navy task force based in Ceylon, see List of task forces of the Royal Navy
- Force (2011 film), an Indian action film, followed by Force 2
