= X force =

X force, Force X, or other variations may refer to:

- X-Force, a fictional mutant superhero team in Marvel Comics' X-Men universe
  - X-Force (comic book), a comic book series featuring the eponymous team, see X-Force
  - Uncanny X-Force, a comic book series featuring the X-Force team
  - Cable and X-Force, a comic book series starring the eponymous team and the character Cable
  - X-Force (film), a future film in the 20th Century Fox X-Men film franchise Deadpool film series featuring the eponymous Marvel Comics superhero team with Cable and Deadpool
- X Force (Chinese Expeditionary Force), a unit of the Chinese army based in India commanded by U.S. theatre general Stilwell
- Mitsubishi Xforce, a crossover SUV
- x force or force x (physics), an unknown force
- x force or force x (physics), an axial component of force, a force vector
- x force or force x, an unknown organization (particularly, criminal, political, or (para-)military)
- "X force", an unknown physical force, see Fifth force

== See also ==
- Y Force (WWII)
- Z Force (disambiguation)
- Force (disambiguation)
- X (disambiguation)
