= Colorado Education Association =

American statewide labor union

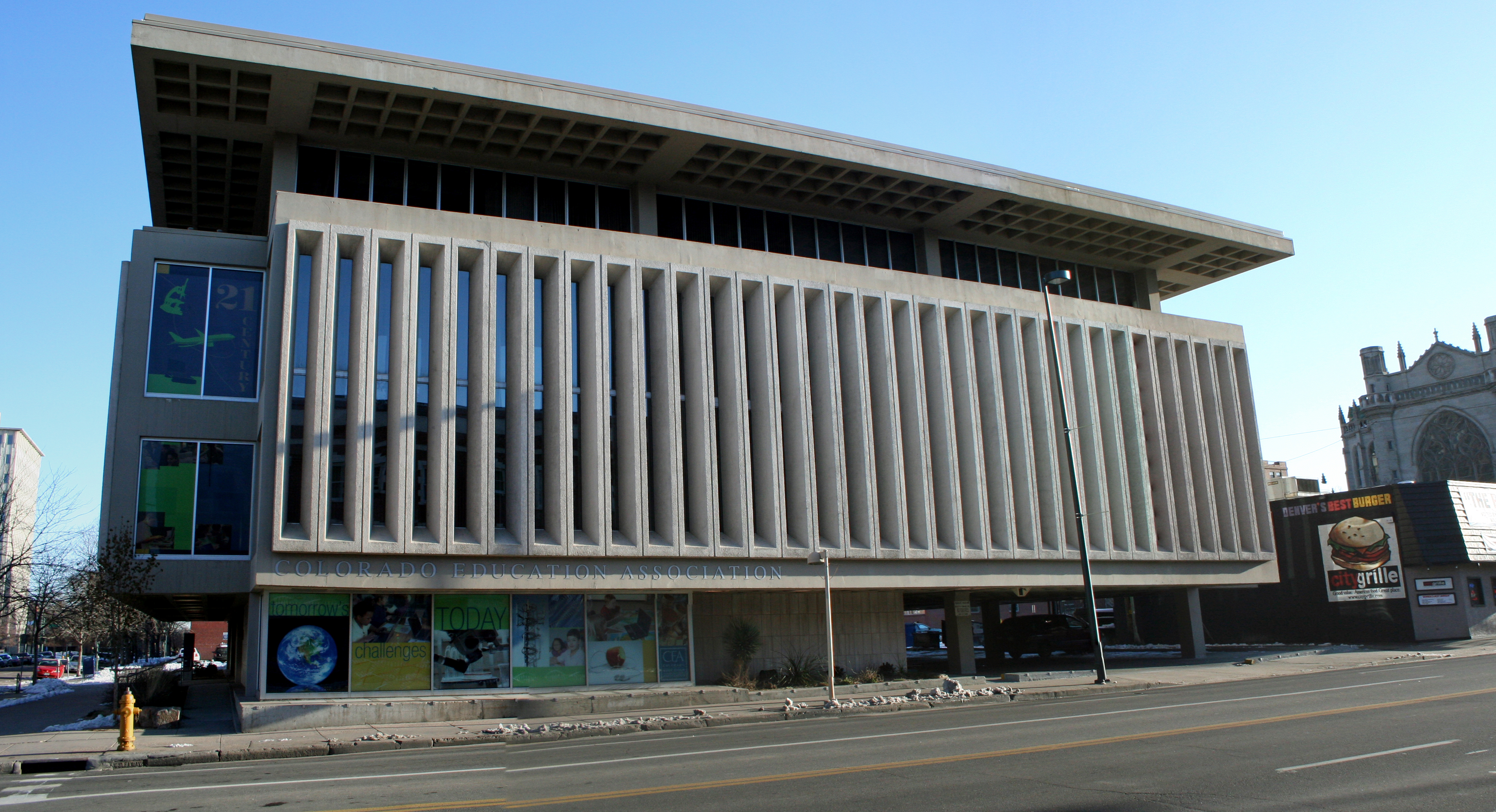
- Headquarters on Colfax Avenue, Denver
- Founded: 1875
- Headquarters: Denver, Colorado
- Location: United States
- Members: 40,000
- Key people: Kevin Vick, president (2024) Kooper Caraway, Executive Director (2024) Liz Waddick, Vice President (2024)
- Affiliations: NEA
- Website: www.coloradoea.org

The Colorado Education Association (CEA) is a statewide federation of teacher and educational workers' labor unions in the state of Colorado in the United States. The CEA is a voluntary membership organization of 40,000 K-12 teachers and education support professionals, higher education faculty and support professionals, retired educators, and students preparing to become teachers. The CEA is a state affiliate of the National Education Association (NEA), America's largest labor union.

== Presidents ==
- Anna Laura Force (1920s)
- C. C. Casey (1930s)
- Alma Krusen (1934)
- Ward B. Kimball (1950s)
- Roberta Price (1974)
- Kerrie Dallman (2012–2018)
- Amie Baca-Oehlert (2018–2024)
- Kevin Vick (2024 to present)

== See also ==
- Colorado Student Assessment Program
