= Anna Laura Force =

American educator

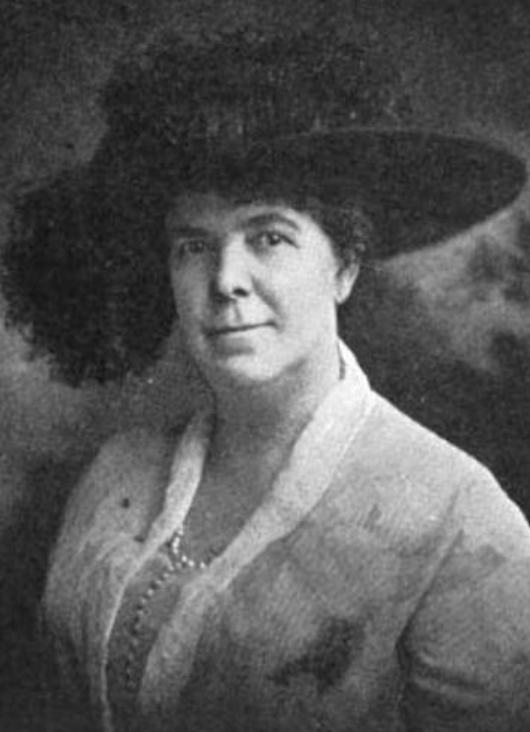
- Anna Laura Force, from a 1924 publication
- Born: April 13, 1868; Denver, Colorado, U.S.
- Died: July 1952 (aged 84); Denver, Colorado, U.S.
- Occupations: educator; school administrator

Anna Laura Force (April 13, 1868 – July 1952) was an American educator and school administrator based in Denver, Colorado. She was president of the Colorado Education Association, and was nominated for president of the National Education Association (NEA) in 1933.

== Early life and education ==
Force was born in Denver, the daughter of John E. Force and Matilda Ann Ellis Force (later Stewart). She graduated from the Colorado State College of Education (CSCE), with further studies at Columbia University and the University of California.

== Career ==
Force was a teacher and school principal in Denver. In 1914, Force became the first woman to conduct the Denver Normal Institute, an annual two-week teacher training program. She was president of the Colorado Education Association and the State Congress of Parents and Teachers, and became director of the Eastern Division of the Colorado Education Association in 1924. She chaired the school lands committee in 1925, She told a The Rocky Mountain News in 1929, "My real joy in work comes from direct contact with boys and girls in whom I have so much confidence."

Force was active in the National Education Association (NEA) at the national level. She was a Colorado delegate to the 1917 NEA meeting in Oregon. In 1923 she was chosen to be one of the NEA's vice presidents. She chaired the retirement committee in 1931. When the World Federation of Education Associations met in Denver in 1931, she was hospitality chair. She was nominated for national NEA president in 1933, but lost the election to Jessie Gray. She served on the executive board of the National Council of Education.

In 1934, Force and Mary C. C. Bradford were described as "original brain-trusters" by federal official Oscar Chapman, who commended both women's contributions to the prosperity of Colorado.

== Publications ==
- "The Kindergarten as an Organic Part of Every Elementary School" (1919)

== Personal life and legacy ==
Force died in 1952, at the age of 84, in Denver. A school in Denver was named for her.
