= Force Majeure (Delivery album) =

Second studio album by Australian garage-punk band Delivery

Studio album by Delivery
- Released: 17 January 2025
- Recorded: November 2023–January 2024
- Studio: Bakehouse (Richmond); Various home studios (Essendon, Coburg, and Parkville); Production Alley (Port Melbourne); The Space (Brunswick)
- Genre: Garage punk
- Length: 39:57
- Label: Heavenly
- Producer: Sam Harding; James Lynch

Delivery chronology
| Forever Giving Handshakes (2022) | Force Majeure (2025) |

Force Majeure is the second studio album by Australian garage punk band Delivery. It was released through Heavenly Recordings on 17 January 2025.

== Background ==
Two years after their debut album was released, Force Majeure was first announced on 24 September 2024 by the band, with the release of the single "Operating At A Loss", which was preceded by the first single "Digging a Hole" and followed by the third single "Only a Fool", in October 2024. The album was recorded by the band and mastered by Mikey Young.

== Reception ==
Professional ratings
Review scores
| Source | Rating |
|---|---|
| Clash Magazine | 7/10 stars |
| Louder Than War | 4/5 stars |
| AllMusic | 4.5/5 stars |

Julia Mason of Clash Magazine described the album as "a riot, in the party sense of the word, and a joyous exposé of the crazy times we live in," rating it 7 out of 10, and Sarah Downs of Rolling Stone called it "a statement of intent".

Louder Than War's Wayne Carey reviewed the album and individual songs, stating "Force Majeure sets the pace for the rest of 2025 and instills the fact that garage punk will never be boring and can be reinvented in the right hands for the kids today."

AllMusic referred to the album as "a small-scale triumph that's built on musicians sweating it out in small rooms, cranking the amps until they begin to crackle, and plugging directly into the still-beating heart of rock & roll," giving it four out of five stars.

== Track listing ==
| No. | Title | Writer(s) | Length |
|---|---|---|---|
| 1. | "Digging The Hole" | James Lynch | 3:27 |
| 2. | "Like A Million Bucks" | Lynch; Rebecca Allan | 2:25 |
| 3. | "Operating At A Loss" | Lynch | 3:21 |
| 4. | "What For?" | Lynch | 2:44 |
| 5. | "Stuck In The Game" | Allan | 2:36 |
| 6. | "The New Alphabet" | Lynch | 4:23 |
| 7. | "Deadlines" | Allan | 3:05 |
| 8. | "Focus, Right" | Sam Harding | 3:25 |
| 9. | "What Else?" | Lynch | 2:54 |
| 10. | "Only A Fool" | Lisa Rashleigh | 4:18 |
| 11. | "Put Your Back Into It" | Harding | 3:17 |
| 12. | "Exacto" | Lynch | 3:57 |
| Total length: | | | 39:57 |

== Personnel ==
Credits adapted from the album's liner notes.

=== Delivery ===
- Rebecca Allan – vocals, bass
- James Lynch – vocals, guitar, synthesizer, production, recording
- Sam Harding – vocals, guitar, cello, production, recording
- Lisa Rashleigh – vocals, guitar
- Daniel Devlin – drums, percussion

=== Additional contributors ===
- Jonathan Boulet – mixing
- Mikey Young – mastering
- James Morris – cover photos
- James Devlin – design
