= Jessie Gray (educator) =

American educator (1876–1948)

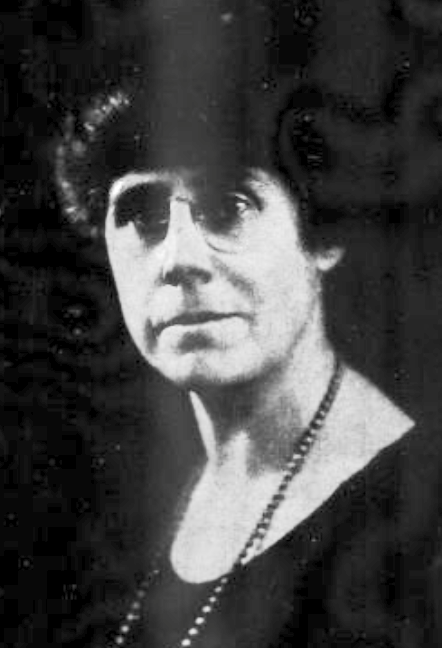
- Gray in a 1925 publication
- Born: June 2, 1876; London, England
- Died: May 29, 1948 (aged 71); Philadelphia, Pennsylvania, US
- Occupation: Educator

Jessie Gray (2 June 1876 – 29 May 1948) was a British-born American educator. She was elected president of the National Education Association in 1933, and in 1925 became the first woman president of the Pennsylvania State Education Association.

== Early life and education ==
Gray was born on 2 June 1876, in London, one of the eight children of Alfred Gray and Sarah Jane Percy Gray. Her parents were from Dorset. She moved to the United States as a child in 1881. She graduated from the Philadelphia High School for Girls, and the Philadelphia Normal School.

== Career ==
From 1896 to 1914, Gray was a primary school teacher in Philadelphia. From 1914 to 1942, she was a training teacher at the Thaddeus Stevens School of Practice, a normal school in Philadelphia. She was president of the Philadelphia Teachers Association. In 1925, she became the first woman elected president of the Pennsylvania State Education Association (PSEA). As PSEA head, she raised awareness of the plight of aged and retired teachers without adequate pensions, asking a 1929 audience, "Can you hear 400 teachers ranging from 72 to 90, calling with feeble voices and tear-dimmed hearts to you for help?"

In 1933, Gray was elected president of the National Education Association (NEA), the first Philadelphian and the second classroom teacher to hold that executive position. Gray toured the United States as a speaker during her term as NEA president, and promoted school district mergers as a budget help during the Great Depression. She was succeeded by Henry Lester Smith in 1934.

Gray was a delegate to the World Federation of Education Associations meeting in Edinburgh in 1925.

== Publications ==
Gray wrote for the Pennsylvania School Journal during her term as president of the PSEA, and for other publications when she was president of the NEA.

- "Watch Our Organization" (1925)
- "How Can the Teacher Mold Character?" (1925)
- "A Professional Challenge" (1925)
- "On To Scranton" (1925)
- "Greetings from the N.E.A." (1933)

== Personal life ==
Gray died after a surgery to amputate her gangrenous right leg in 1948, at the age of 72, at a hospital in Philadelphia.
