= Elite Force =

Elite force or elite forces may refer to:

- Elite forces, highly trained military units
  - Elite fighter, a person of elite forces
  - Elite Forces of Malaysia, units of the Malaysian military
  - Elite Forces, a military wing of Syria's Tomorrow Movement
- Simon Shackleton (born 1974), English musician using the stage name "Elite Force"
- Star Trek: Voyager – Elite Force, a 2000 video game
- Elite Forces WWII: Normandy, a 2001 video game
- Elite Forces: Unit 77, a 2009 video game

== See also ==
- Special forces (disambiguation)
