= Force XXI =

Force XXI or Force 21 may refer to:

- Force 21 (video game), a 1999 real-time strategy game made by Red Storm Entertainment
- Force XXI Battle Command Brigade and Below, a military communications project
- Transformation of the United States Army, at the start of the 21st century
