= Special forces (disambiguation) =

Special forces are military units trained to conduct special operations.

Special Force or Special Forces may also refer to:

== Military ==
- United States Army Special Forces (also known as the "Green Berets"), the largest unit of the United States Army Special Operations Command (USASOC)
- Kikosi Maalum, a Ugandan militia whose name is translated as "Special Force"
- Young Men (Lebanon), also known as Special Force, a militia of the Lebanese Civil War

== Arts, entertainment, and media ==
=== Film ===
- Special Forces (2003 film), an American film
- Forces spéciales, a 2011 French film

=== Music ===
- Special Forces (38 Special album), 1982
- Special Forces (Alice Cooper album), 1981
- Special Forces (Big Ed album), 2000
- Special Forces (Julian Fane album), 2004

=== Video games ===
- Battlefield 2: Special Forces, an expansion pack for the 2005 video game Battlefield 2
- Mortal Kombat: Special Forces, a 2000 action-adventure game, spin-off of the Mortal Kombat franchise
- Special Force (2003 video game), a first-person shooter published by Hezbollah
- Special Force (2004 video game), an online free-to-play first-person shooter developed by Dragonfly
- Special Forces (video game), the 1991 sequel to Airborne Ranger by MicroProse

=== Other uses in arts, entertainment, and media ===
- Special Forces (comics), a comic book series by Kyle Baker
- Special Forces: World's Toughest Test, an American television series

== See also ==
- Commando (disambiguation)
- Elite Force (disambiguation)
- Special operations, unconventional military operations
- SOF: Special Ops Force (TV series)
