= Force Commander =

Force Commander can refer to:

- Force commander (military), a command post in several armed forces or multinational forces; see Area of responsibility
- Star Wars: Force Commander
