= Cleveland Force =

Cleveland Force may refer to:

- Cleveland Force (1978–1988), a defunct indoor soccer club
- Cleveland Crunch, a defunct indoor soccer club which played as the Cleveland Force from 2002 to 2005
