= Vango (company) =

Scottish company

AMG Group Ltd.
- Trade name: Vango
- Industry: Camping & Outdoors
- Founded: 1966
- Founder: Alistair Moodie
- Headquarters: Port Glasgow, Scotland, UK
- Key people: Stephen Newlands, Rob Birrell, Martin Jones, Shona Quigley
- Products: Tents sleeping bags, rucksacks, sleeping matss, camping food, RV awnings, caravan awnings
- Parent: AMG Group Ltd.
- Website: www.vango.co.uk

Vango (legally incorporated as AMG Group Ltd.) is a manufacturer of camping equipment based in Port Glasgow, Scotland. It was founded in 1966 with the acquisition of tent manufacturer James McIlwraith, sail-maker of Govan, in the West of Scotland, by Alistair Moodie and its name was changed to Vango, an anagram of Govan.

Vango manufactures kit items for The Duke of Edinburgh's Award and the Scout Association and provides tents for international disaster relief charity ShelterBox.

In 2014 there was a management buyout at Vango's owners AMG Group, with the Moodie family giving up majority control.
