= Forcing defense =

Strategy in Bridge (card game)

A forcing defense in contract bridge aims to force declarer to repeatedly ruff the defenders' leads. If this can be done often enough, declarer eventually runs out of trumps and may lose control of the hand. A forcing defense is therefore applicable only to contracts played in a trump suit.

The defense should try to make declarer ruff in the long trump hand. Unless declarer is playing for a dummy reversal, he usually intends to ruff losers in the short trump hand anyway. If the defense can shorten declarer's trumps sufficiently, it may wind up with more trumps than declarer. In that case, the defense will be able to pull any remaining trumps and run its own winners.

== Usage ==
A forcing defense is usually begun on the opening lead because the tempo is often important. It is indicated when:

- The defense knows or suspects that the trump suit is breaking badly for declarer.
- There is a side suit that declarer will have to ruff.
- The defense has enough entries that it will be able to continue leading the side suit.

The latter requirement means that the forcing defense is seldom attempted against voluntarily bid slams: the declaring side normally has so much strength that the defense's opportunities to continue to attack the trump suit are very limited.

== Example ==
Alfred Sheinwold cites this example of a forcing defense to South's contract of 4♠:

South in 4♠		♠♤	7 6 5		
South in 4♠		♥	10 8 4		
South in 4♠		♦	A 7 6 5		
South in 4♠		♣♧	K Q 6		
♠♤	A 4 3 2	N W E S		♠♤	—
♥	K Q J 9	N W E S		♥	7 6 5 3 2
♦	8 3 2	N W E S		♦	K 4
♣♧	J 8	N W E S		♣♧	A 10 7 5 3 2
Lead: ♥K		♠♤	K Q J 10 9 8		
Lead: ♥K		♥	A		
Lead: ♥K		♦	Q J 10 9		
Lead: ♥K		♣♧	9 4		

West leads the ♥K. South takes the ♥A and plans to win five spades, one heart, at least three diamonds and a club. He leads the ♠K, West ducks, and East's club discard discloses the bad trump break.

South has no better move than to continue spades, hoping for a defensive error, a winning diamond finesse, or that the hearts block. West ducks his ♠A once again, though, and South now tries the diamond finesse. East wins the ♦K and forces South with another heart. South ruffs and leads a club to the ♣A. East leads another heart and again South has to ruff.

By now, South is down to two trumps and West still has two, including the ♠A. When South leads another trump, West takes the ♠A and a heart lead forces out South's last trump. At the end, West will make his small trump, winning in all two spades, a diamond and a club.

Notice what happens if South continues trumps at trick 4. West takes his ♠A and continues hearts, forcing South to ruff. South has now lost control of the hand. No matter how South continues, the defense continues to force South with heart leads after taking the ♦K and the ♣A, again winning two spades, a diamond and a club, or a trick in each suit.

Notice also that West must wait for the third round of spades to take his ♠A, after which dummy is out of trumps. If he takes his ♠A on either the first or second round of trumps, South can play on the minor suits and ruff a fourth round of hearts in dummy. This would let South preserve trump control, draw West's small trumps, and hold E-W to one trump trick only.
