= Forcing function =

Forcing function can mean:

- In differential calculus, a function that appears in the equations and is only a function of time, and not of any of the other variables.
- In differential calculus as applied in climate science, radiative forcing
- In interaction design, a behavior-shaping constraint, a means of preventing undesirable user input usually made by mistake.
