= Force B (disambiguation) =

Force B was a Royal Navy task force during the Second World War.

It may also refer to:

- Indian Expeditionary Force B, part of the Allied force sent to German East Africa during World War I.
- Task Force B, part of the South Vietnamese Civil Guards Dinh Tuong Regiment at the Battle of Ap Bac, 1962.
- Corps Detachment B, part of the German 8th Army at the Battle of the Korsun–Cherkassy Pocket.
- B-Force, Swedish black metal musician
- Cruiser Force B, the British naval unit enforcing the economic blockade of Germany in World War I. Also called the Northern Patrol.
