= Force of nature =

Force of Nature or Forces of Nature may refer to:

- Fundamental interaction: gravity, electromagnetism, weak interaction, strong interaction

== Film and television ==
- Forces of Nature (1999 film), an American romantic comedy
- Forces of Nature (2004 film), a wide-screen documentary
- Force of Nature (2020 film), an American action thriller
- Force of Nature: The Dry 2, a 2024 Australian film based on the novel by Jane Harper
- "Force of Nature" (Star Trek: The Next Generation), a TV episode
- Force of Nature: The David Suzuki Movie, a 2010 documentary
- "Forces of Nature" (Teen Titans), a TV episode
- Forces of Nature (TV series), presented by Brian Cox
- Max Steel: Forces of Nature, a 2005 American film

== Literature ==
- Forces of Nature (book), by Brian Cox and Andrew Cohen, 2016
- Force of Nature (novel), a 2018 novel by Jane Harper

== Music ==
- Force of Nature (duo), a Japanese hip-hop DJ and production duo

=== Albums ===
- Force of Nature (Tank album), 2001
- Force of Nature (Koko Taylor album), 1993
- Forces of Nature, a 1999 album by Artension
- Forces of Nature, a 2024 live album by McCoy Tyner

=== Songs ===
- "Force of Nature", by Bea Miller from the 2015 album Not an Apology
- "Force of Nature", by Lizzy McAlpine from the deluxe edition of her 2024 album Older
- "Force of Nature", by Oasis from the 2002 album Heathen Chemistry
- "Force of Nature", by Pearl Jam from the 2009 album Backspacer
- "Force of Nature", by Groove Coverage from the 2004 album 7 Years and 50 Days

== Other uses ==
- Force of Nature, a sculpture series by Lorenzo Quinn
- Force of Nature (comics), a fictional team of supervillains

== See also ==
- Natural environment
- List of natural phenomena
