= Duplicate bridge movements =

Scheme used in a duplicate bridge session to assign opponents

A duplicate bridge movement is a scheme used in a duplicate bridge session to arrange which competitors play which opponents when, and which boards they play. The arrangement has to satisfy various constraints which often conflict to some extent, requiring compromises. The resolution of these compromises is to a considerable extent a matter of taste, so players should be consulted as to their preferences if this is practicable.

Movements are categorized by the type of event—Individual, Pairs, or Teams.

== Requirements for duplicate bridge movements ==
Three absolute requirements for a bridge movement are universal:

1. No entrant (individual, pair, or team, depending upon the type of the event) may play the same deal more than once.
2. The number of deals in each session must be appropriate to the level of competition and the circumstances.
3. The movement must provide enough stationary or nearly stationary positions to accommodate the needs of all players who have disabilities and/or mobility impairments.

A sanctioning body may impose additional requirements as a condition of sanctioning or recognizing an event. For example, the English Bridge Union (EBU) now requires that each entrant be "scheduled to play" at least 70% of the deals in play in each session in an individual or pairs game, which, practically means that the number of rounds must be at least 70% of the number of groups of boards in play. The American Contract Bridge League (ACBL) likewise requires at least 2 1/2 tables for a sanctioned standard pairs game, even though there is a valid movement for such a game, while permitting two tables to play an individual game with a "One Winner" Movement or a team matches.

With respect to the second universal requirement, a typical "open" (unrestricted) session at a club or tournament in North America consists of about 25–28 boards (deals) except when 24 deals produces a complete movement (that is, with six, eight, or twelve tables playing some form of complete Mitchell movement as described below), but this may vary in other regions. Of course, a club may choose to play fewer deals in a session connected with a luncheon, party, or some other event or to ensure that an evening session ends at a reasonable hour for players who must go to work on the next day, and sessions on cruise ships also typically are shorter (about 18–20 deals). Sessions for less experienced players also typically consist of fewer deals and, conversely, sessions of some championship events may play more deals.

That said, there are several criteria that are desirable in bridge movements:

- It is desirable for each table to play a separate group of boards in each round, unless there are enough copies of the groups played simultaneously for each table to have its own copy. Nevertheless, some movements frequently chosen for reasons of fairness do require two adjacent tables to play the same group of boards in each round.
- In matchpoint scoring, all boards ideally should be played the same number of times so they all carry the same weight and influence in the final standing.
- Two entrants normally should not play against one another (as opponents the same table) or, in an individual event, come together as partners in more than one round, except when players in an individual event change directions and thus must play against each other twice (with different partners, and ideally on opposite sides—that is, once as right-hand opponent and once as left-hand opponent) to form a complete movement.
- The number of boards per round must be reasonable. In standard matchpoint games and in "board-a-match" team games, two boards per round is the practical minimum and four to five boards per round normally is the desirable maximum. In standard team games other than "board-a-match" competition, six boards per match is the normal minimum and twenty-four boards per match is the normal maximum for open events.
- If there is an odd number of entrants in an individual or pair game, such that entrants must take turns sitting out round due to lack of a full table, it is highly desirable to minimize the number boards per round, and thus the time that the affected entrants must wait for the start of the next round. When there is no sit-out, the decision to play more rounds of fewer boards or fewer rounds of more boards is solely a matter of preference.
- It is generally thought to be desirable that all entrants play all of the deals that are in play.
- The movement should be as fair as possible, as discussed below.
- If there is a break for lunch or any other reason in the middle of a session, it is desirable to arrange the movement so all tables play one subset of the deals before the break and another subset of the deals after the break to ensure that any discussion of deals during the break won't compromise the deals in play after the break.
- Subject to the other constraints, the movement should be as simple as possible to minimize the possibility of errors such as players going to the wrong table, players sitting in the wrong direction at a table, or the players at a table playing the wrong group of boards. This applies to the movement of boards as well as to the movement of players.

The preferences of a particular club or tournament organizer may dictate other constraints. Here are some examples of organizers' preferences that might affect the choice of movement.

- Some organizers may prefer to divide the tables of a session into flights for players of different ranking or experience levels with the flights playing in separate sections and scored separately. This choice typically requires a different movement for each section to accommodate differences in size of the sections and possibly also in the number of boards that the various levels of players might play. Other organizers may prefer to have players of all rankings or abilities play together in the same section(s).
- Some organizers may prefer to split larger events or flights into several sections that play fewer rounds with more boards per round, finding that the game progresses more quickly with fewer rotations. Other organizers may prefer to form larger sections that play more rounds with fewer boards per round, giving each entrant an opportunity to play against more of the other entrants.
- In larger events or flights, some organizers may prefer to rank all entrants into one comparison field to produce a single winner while other organizers may prefer to have multiple comparison fields with a separate winner for each comparison field. In events or flights with more than one section, there are several variations of these options—a separate comparison field for each direction within each flight, a single comparison field in each direction across multiple sections, a single comparison field across both directions within each section with section, or a single comparison field encompassing all entrants in the entire event.

In the absence of explicit requirements dictated by the nature of a particular competition, these considerations are completely discretionary.

=== Fairness of bridge movements ===
There are several considerations in determining the fairness of a bridge movement.

- A complete movement, in which each entrant plays against all of the other entrants or in which all entrants in each scoring field play against all of the same field of opponents, is inherently the fairest choice. The worst scenario is a movement that is one round short of complete: one entrant does not play against a very strong competitor, thus gaining a significant advantage, while another entrant does not play against a very weak competitor, thus incurring a significant disadvantage. When a movement is several rounds short of complete, averaging tends to take over—each competitor misses both weaker and stronger opponents, diminishing the effect. It is possible to diminish this impact further by "seeding" the field—that is, by dispersing entrants with higher and lower rankings or ability uniformly throughout the field.
- Ideally, each entrant should have equal influence on the results of each of the other entrants, at least within each scoring field, taking into account the relative positions in which the entrants play each deal—direct opposition (at the same table), indirect opposition (in the same direction at different tables, thus generating direct comparisons), teaming (in opposing directions at different tables), and, in individual movements, partnership (opposite seats at the same table). Mathematical analysis of standard matchpoint scoring has derived the weight of opposition in the following table based upon the impact of a hypothetical entrant getting either extreme (clear top or clear bottom) scores on all deals compared to a hypothetical entrant getting average scores on all deals. Positive weights means that the entrants are adversaries (an abnormally good result by either hurts the other) and negative weights mean that the entrants are effectively teammates -- that is, an abnormally good result by either helps the other. The term "scoring unit" is that of Law 78A of the Laws of Duplicate Bridge.

Relative Position on Deal	Weight of Opposition in Matchpoint Scoring
Opponent at Same Table	+1 Scoring Unit x Number of Comparisons per Board
Same Direction at Different Tables	+1 Scoring Unit
Opposite Directions at Different Tables	-1 Scoring Unit
Partners (Individual Movement Only)	-1 Scoring Unit x Number of Comparisons per Board

- When there is more than one scoring field in an event or a flight, all scoring fields should have entrants of comparable ability or ranking so that all competitors face competition that's approximately the same strength. In individual and pair events, this extends to each direction of each section when using movements in which each competitor always sits in the same direction. This is usually achieved by "seeding" -- that is, distributing stronger and weaker pairs uniformly throughout the field.
- Vulnerability affects the fairness of a game scored either by Total Points or by International Matchpoints (IMPs) because a pair that is vulnerable receives more points (raw Bridge score) than a pair that's not vulnerable for making the same number of tricks in any game or slam contract while giving up more points for failing to make any contract. These higher scores for the same Bridge result also translate to more IMPs for the same pair of different Bridge results in IMP scoring. When scoring by either of these methods, all pairs should be vulnerable on an equal number of deals—a condition most easily met by playing four boards per round since all regular groups of four boards (1–4, 5–8, etc.) have one board with each combination of vulnerability (none, North–South only, East–West only, and both), ensuring that each partnership is vulnerable on two deals and not vulnerable on the other two deals. Some movements that do not meet this criterion have very bad imbalances of vulnerability. This issue does not apply to standard Matchpoint scoring because all boards award an equal number of matchpoints in each direction regardless of vulnerability.

When scoring multiple sessions as a single event, these criteria apply to the aggregate of all sessions of the event rather than to individual sessions, with the caveat that they apply separately to rounds before and rounds after any elimination of entrants.

=== Barometer games and online bridge movements ===
The term "barometer game" refers to any session in which all tables play the same group of deals concurrently in each round, permitting publication of meaningful standings after completion of each round. The term comes from the practice of displaying standings upon completion of each round, and sometimes upon completion of each board, with competitors moving up and down like a barometer. Although people sometimes say "Barometer Movement" in reference to any movement used in a barometer game, there really is no specific movement by that name. Rather, a barometer game can use any of the movements for individual or pair games described below, but with each table playing the groups of boards in order from first to last rather than as indicated in the tables.

in face-to-face play, a barometer game is most practical for instructional situations in which it is desirable to discuss the bidding and play immediately after the participants play each deal or perhaps at the end of each round. When running a barometer game, it is best to provide a separate set of boards for each table—especially if the game is large enough to play only two boards per round. If a barometer game is small enough to play three or more boards per round, some sharing becomes possible–but this obviously requires deferral of discussion of deals until the end of the respective round.

In online bridge, barometer games are more practical because the same boards can be easily generated and displayed at every separate table without needing large numbers of separate packs of cards, and this is standard practice on common online bridge platforms such as BridgeBase Online (BBO) or RealBridge. This in fact greatly simplifies bridge movements. In traditional movements such as the Mitchell and Howell movements, both players and boards circulate continuously in different ways, and considerable ingenuity is needed to avoid conflicts and ensure that a pair does not play the same boards twice. In a barometer movement all players play the same boards simultaneously, and all that is required is to rotate the players. In pairs games, either two-winner movements or one-winner movements with arrow switching are easily performed. Head-to-head teams matches and multiple teams events with an even number of teams are also straightforward. However, multiple teams events with odd numbers of teams are trickier; either one team has to sit out each round, or some boards have to be played at different times to give the effect of a "long triple". The Thurner-type movements used in face-to-face bridge for odd numbers of teams, with different teams playing each other on different rounds, are not implemented in online bridge platforms.

Barometer games are also used in Swiss Pairs competitions.

== Movements for pair games ==
In a pair game, players enter as pairs that play as partners throughout and score as a unit. The two most prevalent types of pair movements in Bridge are Mitchell Movements and Howell Movements, though Howell Movements actually are a specific subset of One Winner Movements. Normal Mitchell Movements have separate fields of North-South pairs and East-West pairs, so they have usually have separate rankings and winners in each direction, whereas One Winner Movements typically have some pairs play in some rounds in each direction, requiring all pairs to score in a single field that produces just one winner—hence the name. One Winner are typically used for games with only a few tables because they permit play of more rounds than Normal Mitchell Movements, which limit the number of rounds to the number of tables. A Mitchell movement can be converted to a one-winner movement by arrow switching.

=== Mitchell Movement (or "Two Winner" Movements) ===
The Mitchell Movement, first developed by John Templeton Mitchell and also called the "Two Winner" Movement, has two fields of entrants. The entrants in one field always sit North–South while the entrants in the other field always sit East–West in the same section, so the entrants in each field play only against entrants in the other field. The entrants in each field score and place separately, so there is a winner in each field. Pairs are identified by the number of the table where they start and their direction of play (for example, Pair 3 North–South or Pair 5 East–West). The pairs seated North-South typically remain at the same table through every round of play, while groups of boards and East–West pairs go to different tables at the end of each round.

In a complete Mitchell Movement, the number of rounds is equal to both the number of tables and the number of groups of boards actually played during the session, so all of the pairs seated in each direction play one round against each of the pairs seated in the other direction and all pairs play all of the boards that are in play, making it one of the fairest movements in Bridge. The total weight of opposition for any North–South pair and any East–West pair is zero (0) for every complete Mitchell Movement because the number of comparisons for each deal that they play in direct opposition is exactly equal to the number of rounds in which they play in opposite directions at different tables, and all pairs in the same field have the same weight of opposition because they play every deal in the same direction.

Mitchell Movements that are not complete (that is, in which the number of rounds is less than the number of tables) are very popular because they are the easiest movements to run for events with a lot of tables, but the weight of opposition is considerably messier and typically very imbalanced—(1) players seated in the same direction do not play all of the same deals in many Mitchell Movements, and thus have different weight of opposition, (2) pairs who play in direct opposition typically play more or fewer of the same board groups, resulting in different weight of opposition, and (3) pairs seated in opposite directions that do not oppose each other constructively become teammates. The Web Movement and Double Web Movement, described below, eliminate the first two of these issues but amplify the third.

In larger events, directors often split the entrants into two or more sections that play separately. When there is more than one section, each section may have its own North-South and East-West scoring fields or, if all sections play the same deals, the directors may combine the North-South and East-West fields across all sections for scoring. The latter practice actually exacerbates the imbalance in weight of opposition of an incomplete movement because it amplifies the weight of direct opposition while rendering pairs playing in opposite directions of different fields as constructive teammates for the entire session. With each section having separate fields, the entrants in different sections have no weight of opposition on each others' results.

A few movements derived from true Mitchell Movements have one or more entrants that play some deals in both directions. Such movements really are not Mitchell Movements even though they typically retain the word "Mitchell" in their names, so they are described in the section on "One Winner" movements below.

==== Basic Mitchell Movement Movement (or Standard Mitchell Movement or Straight Mitchell Movement) ====
The Basic Mitchell Movement, also known as the Standard Mitchell Movement or the Straight Mitchell Movement, is the simplest Mitchell Movement. At the end of each round, the pairs sitting East–West move up one table, with the pair that's leaving the last table going to the first table, and the boards (deals) move down one table, with boards leaving the first table going to the last table. The first group of boards normally starts at Table #1, the second group at Table #2, etc., so the North–South pairs play consecutive groups of boards in ascending order and consecutive East–West pairs in descending order while the East–West players play alternate groups of boards and consecutive North-South pairs, both in ascending order, as the movement progresses. The table below shows the East–West pair (EW) and the board group (BG) at each table in a Basic Mitchell Movement for five tables with five rounds of play.

Table	Round 1	Round 2	Round 3	Round 4	Round 5
1	EW 1 BG A	EW 5 BG B	EW 4 BG C	EW 3 BG D	EW 2 BG E
2	EW 2 BG B	EW 1 BG C	EW 5 BG D	EW 4 BG E	EW 3 BG A
3	EW 3 BG C	EW 2 BG D	EW 1 BG E	EW 5 BG A	EW 4 BG B
4	EW 4 BG D	EW 3 BG E	EW 2 BG A	EW 1 BG B	EW 5 BG C
5	EW 5 BG E	EW 4 BG A	EW 3 BG B	EW 2 BG C	EW 1 BG D

The tables for movements in this article use letters to designate the groups of boards in play at each table because the specific boards in each group depend upon the number of deals in each round, as shown in the following table. A normal session of an open event would play 25 boards with this movement, while events for less experienced players typically would play fewer boards and a championship event for experts could play more—but the movement also can run with more or fewer boards if it is desirable to hold a shorter or longer game for some other reason.

Total Deals Played	10	15	20	25	30
Normal Level of Game	Beginner	Adv. Beginner	Intermediate	Open	Championship
Board Group A	Boards 1–2	Boards 1–3	Boards 1–4	Boards 1–5	Boards 1–6
Board Group B	Boards 3–4	Boards 4–6	Boards 5–8	Boards 6–10	Boards 7–12
Board Group C	Boards 5–6	Boards 7–9	Boards 9–12	Boards 11–15	Boards 13–18
Board Group D	Boards 7–8	Boards 10–12	Boards 13–16	Boards 16–20	Boards 19–24
Board Group E	Boards 9–10	Boards 13–15	Boards 17–20	Boards 21–25	Boards 25–30

In its normal form illustrated above, the Straight Mitchell Movement requires an odd number of tables so that the East–West pairs interleave with the boards that they have already played when they reach the midpoint of the movement. With an even number of tables, the East–West pairs would meet boards that they played in the first round at the midpoint of a complete movement, requiring a variant of the movement. The most common variants for an even number of tables, both discussed below, are the Skip Mitchell Movement, used when the number of tables does not allow a complete movement, and the Relay and Bye Stand Mitchell Movement, also called the Relay and Share Mitchell Movement in the United Kingdom, for a complete movement. However, this restriction does not apply to the "Barometer" form of the movement in which all tables play the same deals in each round, as illustrated in the following table.

Table	Round 1	Round 2	Round 3	Round 4	Round 5	Round 6
1	EW 1 BG A	EW 6 BG B	EW 5 BG C	EW 4 BG D	EW 3 BG E	EW 2 BG F
2	EW 2 BG A	EW 1 BG B	EW 6 BG C	EW 5 BG D	EW 4 BG E	EW 3 BG F
3	EW 3 BG A	EW 2 BG B	EW 1 BG C	EW 6 BG D	EW 5 BG E	EW 4 BG F
4	EW 4 BG A	EW 3 BG B	EW 2 BG C	EW 1 BG D	EW 6 BG E	EW 5 BG F
5	EW 5 BG A	EW 4 BG B	EW 3 BG C	EW 2 BG D	EW 1 BG E	EW 6 BG F
6	EW 6 BG A	EW 5 BG B	EW 4 BG C	EW 3 BG D	EW 2 BG E	EW 1 BG F

When there is an odd number of pairs, the most common practice is to add a phantom pair to complete the final table. Thus, a game with seventeen pairs uses a movement for nine tables with one position vacant. The phantom pair, which may be in either direction, progresses in the same manner as the missing actual pair. The pairs playing in the opposite direction "sit out" when scheduled to play the phantom pair, so they do not play the respective deals (boards). The Rover Mitchell Movement and Two-Way Rover Mitchell Movement, both described below, in which the odd pair displaces a different pair each round with the displaced pair sitting out, are alternative options in this situation.

==== Skip Mitchell Movement ====
The Skip Mitchell Movement is the simplest Mitchell movement for an even number of tables. In its simplest form, the East-West pairs move up two tables at the midpoint of the (complete) movement, when they otherwise would encounter the deals (boards) that they played in the first round. The boards that they play after the skip to interleave with the boards that they played before the skip with normal movement thereafter, as in the Straight Mitchell Movement. However, the skip limits the number of rounds to one less than the number of tables so the movement cannot be complete. Thus, a Skip Mitchell is normally preferred only when the number of tables makes a complete movement impracticable. The following table shows a Skip Mitchell movement for ten tables playing nine rounds. Note that one more rotation would bring the East–West pairs back to their starting tables and to their opponents in the first round.

Table	Round 1	Round 2	Round 3	Round 4	Round 5	Round 6	Round 7	Round 8	Round 9
1	EW 1 BG A	EW 10 BG B	EW 9 BG C	EW 8 BG D	EW 7 BG E	EW 5 BG F	EW 4 BG G	EW 3 BG H	EW 2 BG I
2	EW 2 BG B	EW 1 BG C	EW 10 BG D	EW 9 BG E	EW 8 BG F	EW 6 BG G	EW 5 BG H	EW 4 BG I	EW 3 BG J
3	EW 3 BG C	EW 2 BG D	EW 1 BG E	EW 10 BG F	EW 9 BG G	EW 7 BG H	EW 6 BG I	EW 5 BG J	EW 4 BG A
4	EW 4 BG D	EW 3 BG E	EW 2 BG F	EW 1 BG G	EW 10 BG H	EW 8 BG I	EW 7 BG J	EW 6 BG A	EW 5 BG B
5	EW 5 BG E	EW 4 BG F	EW 3 BG G	EW 2 BG H	EW 1 BG I	EW 9 BG J	EW 8 BG A	EW 7 BG B	EW 6 BG C
6	EW 6 BG F	EW 5 BG G	EW 4 BG H	EW 3 BG I	EW 2 BG J	EW 10 BG A	EW 9 BG B	EW 8 BG C	EW 7 BG D
7	EW 7 BG G	EW 6 BG H	EW 5 BG I	EW 4 BG J	EW 3 BG A	EW 1 BG B	EW 10 BG C	EW 9 BG D	EW 8 BG E
8	EW 8 BG H	EW 7 BG I	EW 6 BG J	EW 5 BG A	EW 4 BG B	EW 2 BG C	EW 1 BG D	EW 10 BG E	EW 9 BG F
9	EW 9 BG I	EW 8 BG J	EW 7 BG A	EW 6 BG B	EW 5 BG C	EW 3 BG D	EW 2 BG E	EW 1 BG F	EW 10 BG G
10	EW 10 BG J	EW 9 BG A	EW 8 BG B	EW 7 BG C	EW 6 BG D	EW 4 BG E	EW 3 BG F	EW 2 BG G	EW 1 BG H

The Skip Mitchell Movement provides a simple vehicle to accommodate players who arrive after a Standard Mitchell Movement or a Skip Mitchell Movement is set. The director need only place additional board groups on the additional tables and add or remove the skip, depending upon whether the number of tables becomes even or odd.

==== Relay and Bye Stand Mitchell (or Share and Relay Mitchell) ====
The Relay and Bye Stand Mitchell, also called a Share and Relay Mitchell in the United Kingdom, modifies the board sequencing of a standard Mitchell movement so that each East–West pair plays the even groups of boards on one side of the movement and odd board groups on the other side of the movement, permitting a complete movement with an even number of tables. To make this happen, two consecutive tables play the same group of boards in each round throughout the session while the opposite group of boards sits out of play on a table or stand between the tables directly opposite the tables that are playing the same deals—and it is here that regional differences in terminology may be a source of confusion.

- In the American Contract Bridge League (ACBL), the two tables sharing boards are called a "relay" and the stand that holds the boards that are out of play is called a "bye stand."
- But in the English Bridge Union (EBU), the two tables sharing boards are called a "share" and the stand that holds the boards that are out of play is called a "relay."

The following table shows a Relay and Bye Stand Mitchell for eight tables with Table 2 and Table 3 sharing one group of boards and the bye stand between Table 6 and Table 7 (which, with eight tables, are directly opposite Table 2 and Table 3, respectively, in the rotation).

Table	Round 1	Round 2	Round 3	Round 4	Round 5	Round 6	Round 7	Round 8
1	EW 1 BG A	EW 8 BG B	EW 7 BG C	EW 6 BG D	EW 5 BG E	EW 4 BG F	EW 3 BG G	EW 2 BG H
2	EW 2 BG B	EW 1 BG C	EW 8 BG D	EW 7 BG E	EW 6 BG F	EW 5 BG G	EW 4 BG H	EW 3 BG A
3	EW 3 BG B	EW 2 BG C	EW 1 BG D	EW 8 BG E	EW 7 BG F	EW 6 BG G	EW 5 BG H	EW 4 BG A
4	EW 4 BG C	EW 3 BG D	EW 2 BG E	EW 1 BG F	EW 8 BG G	EW 7 BG H	EW 6 BG A	EW 5 BG B
5	EW 5 BG D	EW 4 BG E	EW 3 BG F	EW 2 BG G	EW 1 BG H	EW 8 BG A	EW 7 BG B	EW 6 BG C
6	EW 6 BG E	EW 5 BG F	EW 4 BG G	EW 3 BG H	EW 2 BG A	EW 1 BG B	EW 8 BG C	EW 7 BG D
Bye Stand	BG F	BG G	BG H	BG A	BG B	BG C	BG D	BG E
7	EW 7 BG G	EW 6 BG H	EW 5 BG A	EW 4 BG B	EW 3 BG C	EW 2 BG D	EW 1 BG E	EW 8 BG F
8	EW 8 BG H	EW 7 BG A	EW 6 BG B	EW 5 BG C	EW 4 BG D	EW 3 BG E	EW 2 BG F	EW 1 BG G

Physical sharing of boards can slow down the progress of the game, especially when playing only two or three boards per round, and many players find the physical exchange of boards to be an inconvenience. With electronic scoring, it also increases the risk that players may forget to override the default board numbers supplied by the scoring system and thus cross the results for the boards in each group. There are three remedies for this.

- With an odd number of pairs, the director can position the phantom pair North–South at one of the tables that would share boards, creating a sit-out for East–West pairs at that table. The boards simply skip the phantom's table in the movement cycle.
- In an event with two identical sections, the director can position the pairs of tables sharing boards at opposite points in the movements so that one of the tables that is logically sharing boards in each section can use the boards that would otherwise be on the other section's bye stand.
- If a modern board duplicating machine is available, the director can duplicate an additional set of boards for one of the two tables that are playing the same deals. With two tables sharing boards in more than one section, the director can position the tables sharing boards in different locations in the respective movements so they can use boards from just one additional set.

Each of these options creates a better experience for the players while reducing the risk of scoring errors.

When using two sets of boards, some directors prefer to have each set of boards played at about half of the tables that are not part of the share so that there are valid comparisons on any boards discovered to have been misdealt.

- One option is to use a separate set of boards on each side of the movement, as demarked by the relay and bye stand (or share and relay). In the example movement above, Tables 1, 2, 7, and 8 would use one set of boards, with boards entering at Table 2 and exiting at Table 7, and Tables 3, 4, 5, and 6 would use the other, with boards entering at Table 6 and exiting at Table 3. The remaining boards of each set usually are placed on stands next to the table where they will enter. During the round before the midpoint of the movement (Round 4 in the example), the director brings the boards that have exited on each side to the stand next to the table where they will reenter later in the session.
- Another option is to have one set of boards enter at the table with the lower number of the two tables that play the same deals in each round (or at the table with the highest number if it plays the same deals as Table 1) and retire the other set of boards after play at the table with the higher number of the two tables that play the same deals in each round (or Table 1 if it plays the same deals as the table with the highest number). In the above example, one set of boards would enter at Table 2 and the other set of boards would be retired after Table 3 plays them.

The first of these options is generally preferable when both board sets are available at the start of the session, as it provides an equal number of plays of each version of any misdealt board. However, the latter option allows the director to complete duplication of the second set of boards after play has started.

==== Crisscross Mitchell Movement (or Double Weave Mitchell Movement) ====
The Crisscross Mitchell Movement alters the movement of players and boards in a Standard Mitchell Movement to permit a complete movement without a relay and bye stand (or share and relay) if the number of tables is a multiple of four. This movement is used most commonly with eight or twelve tables, but it also can be used with four or sixteen tables.

- The even-numbered East–West pairs and the odd-numbered East–West pairs move in contrary directions, so that pairs moving up trade places ("crisscross") with pairs at the next higher table moving down at the end of each round.
- The boards move in the opposite direction from the East–West pairs leaving each table, thus crisscrossing on the other sides of the tables, except at the midpoint of the movement when the boards go to the opposite table in the movement (also a crisscross) and reverse direction.

Thus, the odd East-West pairs play the odd board groups in the first half of the movement and the even board groups in the second half of the movement while the even East-West pairs do the reverse.

The following table shows a Crisscross Mitchell Movement for eight tables. In this example, the odd East-West pairs move down while the even East-West pairs move up.

Table	Round 1	Round 2	Round 3	Round 4	Round 5	Round 6	Round 7	Round 8
1	EW 1 BG A	EW 8 BG B	EW 3 BG G	EW 6 BG D	EW 5 BG H	EW 4 BG C	EW 7 BG F	EW 2 BG E
2	EW 2 BG B	EW 3 BG A	EW 8 BG D	EW 5 BG G	EW 6 BG C	EW 7 BG H	EW 4 BG E	EW 1 BG F
3	EW 3 BG C	EW 2 BG D	EW 5 BG A	EW 8 BG F	EW 7 BG B	EW 6 BG E	EW 1 BG H	EW 4 BG G
4	EW 4 BG D	EW 5 BG C	EW 2 BG F	EW 7 BG A	EW 8 BG E	EW 1 BG B	EW 6 BG G	EW 3 BG H
5	EW 5 BG E	EW 4 BG F	EW 7 BG C	EW 2 BG H	EW 1 BG D	EW 8 BG G	EW 3 BG B	EW 6 BG A
6	EW 6 BG F	EW 7 BG E	EW 4 BG H	EW 1 BG C	EW 2 BG G	EW 3 BG D	EW 8 BG A	EW 5 BG B
7	EW 7 BG G	EW 6 BG H	EW 1 BG E	EW 4 BG B	EW 3 BG F	EW 2 BG A	EW 5 BG D	EW 8 BG C
8	EW 8 BG H	EW 1 BG G	EW 6 BG B	EW 3 BG E	EW 4 BG A	EW 5 BG F	EW 2 BG C	EW 7 BG D

Note that the Crisscross Mitchell Movement has the same set-up as a Straight Mitchell Movement with one additional table. Thus, the director can add a table to accommodate players who arrive after the movement has been set or, conversely, can retreat to this movement after setting a Straight Mitchell Movement for one additional table if players who are running late fail to show or if a pair scheduled to have the first sit-out decides to withdraw.

==== American Whist League (AWL) Movement ====
The American Whist League (AWL) Movement is a variation of the Standard Mitchell Movement in which the East-West pairs move down two tables rather than up one table. The boards still move down one table. This movement requires that the number of tables be odd. The following table shows the AWL Movement for five tables.

Table	Round 1	Round 2	Round 3	Round 4	Round 5
1	EW 1 BG A	EW 3 BG B	EW 5 BG C	EW 2 BG D	EW 4 BG E
2	EW 2 BG B	EW 4 BG C	EW 1 BG D	EW 3 BG E	EW 5 BG A
3	EW 3 BG C	EW 5 BG D	EW 2 BG E	EW 4 BG A	EW 1 BG B
4	EW 4 BG D	EW 1 BG E	EW 3 BG A	EW 5 BG B	EW 2 BG C
5	EW 5 BG E	EW 2 BG A	EW 4 BG B	EW 1 BG C	EW 3 BG D

Although legal, the American Whist League Movement is seldom used in pairs games because it offers no advantage whatsoever over a Standard Mitchell Movement, which runs more smoothly because players are accustomed to it. Rather, stripped of the first round, the AWL Movement finds its niche in team competitions, such as multiple teams events or "Board-a-Match" (BAM), as discussed below. Note that the numbers of the North–South pair (table) and the East–West pair playing each group of boards in Round 2 and Round 5 are reversed, and the same is true of the numbers of the North–South pair (table) and the East–West pair playing each group of boards in Round 3 and Round 4. In BAM competition, the North-South and East-West pairs with the same number are the two partnerships of the respective team.

==== Two Stanza Mitchell Movement ====
A Two Stanza Mitchell Movement is a movement configured for a break, which could be for lunch, for a presentation of some award or recognition, for election of club officers or transaction of club business requiring discussion and vote of the membership, or for some other purpose, at the midpoint of the session. In this situation, it is best to have all entrants play approximately the first half of the deals before the break, constituting the first stanza, and the remaining deals after the break, constituting the second stanza, so that there is no potential for discussion of deals during the break to compromise the play of any deals in the remaining rounds. The following table shows a Two Stanza Mitchell Movement for six tables with a break after the third round. The players and boards move in the normal manner for a Mitchell movement, except that all boards played in the first stanza go out of play and new boards come into play at the break. Note that this movement works best with enough copies of the boards so to eliminate physical sharing.

Table	Round 1	Round 2	Round 3	Round 4	Round 5	Round 6
1	EW 1 BG A	EW 6 BG B	EW 5 BG C	EW 4 BG D	EW 3 BG E	EW 2 BG F
2	EW 2 BG B	EW 1 BG C	EW 6 BG A	EW 5 BG E	EW 4 BG F	EW 3 BG D
3	EW 3 BG C	EW 2 BG A	EW 1 BG B	EW 6 BG F	EW 5 BG D	EW 4 BG E
4	EW 4 BG A	EW 3 BG B	EW 2 BG C	EW 1 BG D	EW 6 BG E	EW 5 BG F
5	EW 5 BG B	EW 4 BG C	EW 3 BG A	EW 2 BG E	EW 1 BG F	EW 6 BG D
6	EW 6 BG C	EW 5 BG A	EW 4 BG B	EW 3 BG F	EW 2 BG D	EW 3 BG E

The pattern of movement shown in this example will work for any even number of tables that is not a multiple of four, provided that the number of rounds is equal to the number of tables. Another option, for any even number of tables, is to use the American Whist League (AWL) movement, described above, within each stanza with East-West pairs moving just one table, either up or down, at the break. Alternatively, there are specific movement patterns for eight tables and twelve tables.

>> With eight tables, all East–West pairs move up two tables after each round except at the midpoint, when they move up just one table. Thus, the odd-numbered East–West pairs visit the odd-numbered tables in the first stanza and the even-numbered tables in the second stanza while the even-numbered East-West pairs do the reverse.

>> With twelve tables, all East–West pairs move normally (that is, up one table after each round) except after Round 3 and Round 9, when they move up four tables. For the East–West pairs, the tables skipped after Round 3 are the tables played in the last three rounds and the tables skipped after Round 9 are the tables played in the first three rounds.

It is also possible to use the Double Web Movement, described below, to accommodate any number of tables. However, the Double Web Movement requires that the break be either one round before or one round after the exact midpoint of the movement (that is, after either Round 3 or Round 5 if the movement is eight rounds or after either Round 5 or Round 7 if the movement is twelve rounds).

It is also possible to configure a Mitchell Movement with more than two stanzas to accommodate more than one break during a session, if circumstances require this.

==== Scissors Mitchell Movement ====
The Scissors Mitchell Movement is an interesting creature. The movement begins like a Standard Mitchell Movement, but it has two scissors rounds where each board group is split in half. In the first scissors round, which must be in the first half of the movement, each table plays one half of the boards in the board group that it receives, then passes those boards to the next lower table, which also plays them, while retaining but not playing the other half of the boards in the board group that it received initially. At the end of the first scissors round, the boards played twice get passed again and join the boards not played in the previous round at that table to form a new board group. The new board group remains intact until the second scissors round, which is half of the total number of rounds after the first. In the second scissors round, the boards played twice in the first scissors round are set aside and the boards not played in the second scissors round are played twice in the same manner. After the second scissors round, the boards played twice are passed again to reconstitute the original board group. The following table shows a Scissors Mitchell Movement of six tables playing six full rounds, with the halves of the initial board groups designated numerically (that is, the initial board group A consists of halves A1 and A2).

Table	Round 1	Round 2	Round 3	Round 4	Round 5	Round 6
1	EW 1 BG A1,A2	EW 6 BG B1,C1	EW 5 BG D1,B2	EW 4 BG E1,C2	EW 3 BG D2,E2	EW 2 BG F1,F2
2	EW 2 BG B1,B2	EW 1 BG C1,D1	EW 6 BG E1,C2	EW 5 BG F1,D2	EW 4 BG E2,F2	EW 3 BG A1,A2
3	EW 3 BG C1,C2	EW 2 BG D1,E1	EW 1 BG F1,D2	EW 6 BG A1,E2	EW 5 BG F2,A2	EW 4 BG B1,B2
4	EW 4 BG D1,D2	EW 3 BG E1,F1	EW 2 BG A1,E2	EW 1 BG B1,F2	EW 6 BG A2,B2	EW 5 BG C1,C2
5	EW 5 BG E1,E2	EW 4 BG F1,A1	EW 3 BG B1,F2	EW 2 BG C1,A2	EW 1 BG B2,C2	EW 6 BG D1,D2
6	EW 6 BG F1,F2	EW 5 BG A1,B1	EW 4 BG C1,A2	EW 3 BG D1,B2	EW 2 BG C2,D2	EW 1 BG E1,E2

Most Bridge scoring programs expect board groups to be invariant throughout the entire movement, so it may take a bit of creativity to get a program to score this type of movement. The external movement M0612 supplied with the ACBLscore® program distributed by the American Contract Bridge League, for example, implements a Scissors Mitchell Movement for six tables as twelve (half) rounds with both pairs remaining at each table for two consecutive (half) rounds and half of each initial board group assigned to each (half) round so that the halves of each initial board group can move separately.

==== Rover Mitchell Movement (or Bump Mitchell Movement) ====
A Rover Mitchell Movement, also called a Bump Mitchell Movement, is a modification of a Mitchell movement to accommodate an odd number of pairs without a phantom. This movement is most commonly employed to accommodate a pair who arrives after a movement is set, since it does not require addition of another table, or in situations in which there is not space for another table. In its standard form, the roving pair displaces only North–South or East–West pairs and scores in the respective field. The roving pair usually sits out in the first round, and other pairs sit out in subsequent rounds when the roving pair displaces them. The following table illustrates an East–West Rover Mitchell Movement for five tables playing five rounds; the roving pair is East–West Pair 6. Note that East–West Pair 5 is not "bumped" and thus plays all of the boards in the session.

Table	Round 1	Round 2	Round 3	Round 4	Round 5
1	EW 1 BG A	EW 5 BG B	EW 4 BG C	EW 6 BG D	EW 2 BG E
2	EW 2 BG B	EW 6 BG C	EW 5 BG D	EW 4 BG E	EW 3 BG A
3	EW 3 BG C	EW 2 BG D	EW 1 BG E	EW 5 BG A	EW 6 BG B
4	EW 4 BG D	EW 3 BG E	EW 6 BG A	EW 1 BG B	EW 5 BG C
5	EW 5 BG E	EW 4 BG A	EW 3 BG B	EW 2 BG C	EW 1 BG D
(Sit-Out)	EW 6	EW 1	EW 2	EW 3	EW 4

The generation of a Rover Mitchell Movement involves some fairly complex number theory. If the number of full tables is a prime number greater than four, the roving pair can start anywhere and move either up or down two tables in each round, thus displacing and encountering a different North–South pair, a different East–West pair, and a different group of boards in each round. The generation of Rover Mitchell Movement is considerably more difficult if the number of tables is not prime because the roving pair typically must move in an irregular manner to avoid both the deals and the pairs that it has encountered or displaced in the preceding rounds.

If another pair arrives after a Rover Mitchell Movement has been set, it is possible to add a "party table" to the Rover Mitchell Movement. The pair that arrives late becomes a stationary pair at the party table, playing the boards that the roving pair otherwise would not play against the roving pair in the first round and the boards that the roving pair is playing against the pair displaced by the roving pair in each subsequent round. The following table shows the Rover Mitchell Movement above with the addition of a party table (in this example, Table 6, with the added pair becoming North-South Pair 6). It is best to duplicate a separate set of boards for the "party table" because the "party table" plays the same deals as each of the other tables in one round, creating an awkward situation with actual sharing of boards.

Table	Round 1	Round 2	Round 3	Round 4	Round 5
1	EW 1 BG A	EW 5 BG B	EW 4 BG C	EW 6 BG D	EW 2 BG E
2	EW 2 BG B	EW 6 BG C	EW 5 BG D	EW 4 BG E	EW 3 BG A
3	EW 3 BG C	EW 2 BG D	EW 1 BG E	EW 5 BG A	EW 6 BG B
4	EW 4 BG D	EW 3 BG E	EW 6 BG A	EW 1 BG B	EW 5 BG C
5	EW 5 BG E	EW 4 BG A	EW 3 BG B	EW 2 BG C	EW 1 BG D
6	EW 6 BG E	EW 1 BG C	EW 2 BG A	EW 3 BG D	EW 4 BG B

==== Web Movement ====
The Web Movement is a variation of the standard Mitchell movement in which there are more tables than rounds, but all pairs play all of the boards (deals) that are in play. There is one mathematical constraint – a Web movement with an odd number of tables must have an odd number of rounds. A Web movement with an even number of rounds requires that East-West pairs skip a table at the midpoint of the movement, so East–West pairs would skip a table after the sixth round in a twelve-round Web movement.

The actual web in a web movement always consists of an even number of tables not exceeding twice the number of rounds, split into two subsections of equal size. The first subsection plays the groups of boards in normal (ascending) order while the second subsection plays the groups of board in reverse (descending) order, sequenced so the boards move normally within each subsection, with additional groups of boards on a bye stand next to the highest table of each subsection. The East-West pairs move normally (up one table each round except in the case of a skip) within or through the web. The Web Movement in which six tables play five rounds, shown in the following table, illustrates how this works.

Table	Round 1	Round 2	Round 3	Round 4	Round 5
1	EW 1 BG A	EW 6 BG B	EW 5 BG C	EW 4 BG D	EW 3 BG E
2	EW 2 BG B	EW 1 BG C	EW 6 BG D	EW 5 BG E	EW 4 BG A
3	EW 3 BG C	EW 2 BG D	EW 1 BG E	EW 6 BG A	EW 5 BG B
Bye Stand	BG D, BG E	BG E, BG A	BG A, BG B	BG B, BG C	BG C, BG D
4	EW 4 BG B	EW 3 BG A	EW 2 BG E	EW 1 BG D	EW 6 BG C
5	EW 5 BG A	EW 4 BG E	EW 3 BG D	EW 2 BG C	EW 1 BG B
6	EW 6 BG E	EW 5 BG D	EW 4 BG C	EW 3 BG B	EW 2 BG A
Bye Stand	BG D, BG C	BG C, BG B	BG B, BG A	BG A, BG E	BG E, BG D

One can prepend any number of additional subsections in which the number of tables is equal to the number of rounds onto any web, but each additional subsection requires an additional copy of the boards for the movement to run smoothly. Since the number of tables in the actual web must be even, this capability is what allows use of a Web Movement to play an odd number of rounds when the number of tables is odd. The following table shows the Web movement for eleven tables playing five rounds, obtained by prepending one subsection of five tables to the web in the preceding example (now at tables 6–11). The groups of boards move normally between the prepended subsection(s) and the lower half of the web, with boards from Table 1 going to the bye stand at the highest table in the lower subsection of the actual web (Table 8 in this example).

Table	Round 1	Round 2	Round 3	Round 4	Round 5
1	EW 1 BG A	EW 11 BG B	EW 10 BG C	EW 9 BG D	EW 8 BG E
2	EW 2 BG B	EW 1 BG C	EW 11 BG D	EW 10 BG E	EW 9 BG A
3	EW 3 BG C	EW 2 BG D	EW 1 BG E	EW 11 BG A	EW 10 BG B
4	EW 4 BG D	EW 3 BG E	EW 2 BG A	EW 1 BG B	EW 11 BG C
5	EW 5 BG E	EW 4 BG A	EW 3 BG B	EW 2 BG C	EW 1 BG D
6	EW 6 BG A	EW 5 BG B	EW 4 BG C	EW 3 BG D	EW 2 BG E
7	EW 7 BG B	EW 6 BG C	EW 5 BG D	EW 4 BG E	EW 3 BG A
8	EW 8 BG C	EW 7 BG D	EW 6 BG E	EW 5 BG A	EW 4 BG B
Bye Stand	BG D, BG E	BG E, BG A	BG A, BG B	BG B, BG C	BG C, BG D
9	EW 9 BG B	EW 8 BG A	EW 7 BG E	EW 6 BG D	EW 5 BG C
10	EW 10 BG A	EW 9 BG E	EW 8 BG D	EW 7 BG C	EW 6 BG B
11	EW 11 BG E	EW 10 BG D	EW 9 BG C	EW 8 BG B	EW 7 BG A
Bye Stand	BG D, BG C	BG C, BG B	BG B, BG A	BG A, BG E	BG E, BG D

In the special case in which prepended subsections reduce the actual web to just two tables as in the following example of a web of seven tables playing five rounds, it is possible to use just one set of the boards for both sides of the web. In this situation, the two tables in the web play the same group of boards only in the middle round if the number of rounds is odd, as illustrated by the following table showing a web of ten tables playing five rounds (with asterisks indicating the shared group of boards in the middle round). The simplest board movement is that boards played at the highest table go to a bye stand at the next lower table and boards played at Table 1 going to the bye stand next to the highest table, as this movement remains constant throughout.

Table	Round 1	Round 2	Round 3	Round 4	Round 5
1	EW 1 BG A	EW 12 BG B	EW 11 BG C	EW 10 BG D	EW 9 BG E
2	EW 2 BG B	EW 1 BG C	EW 12 BG D	EW 11 BG E	EW 10 BG A
3	EW 3 BG C	EW 2 BG D	EW 1 BG E	EW 12 BG A	EW 11 BG B
4	EW 4 BG D	EW 3 BG E	EW 2 BG A	EW 1 BG B	EW 12 BG C
5	EW 5 BG E	EW 4 BG A	EW 3 BG B	EW 2 BG C	EW 1 BG D
6	EW 6 BG A	EW 5 BG B	EW 4 BG C	EW 3 BG D	EW 2 BG E
7	EW 7 BG B	EW 6 BG C	EW 5 BG D	EW 4 BG E	EW 3 BG A
8	EW 8 BG C	EW 7 BG D	EW 6 BG E	EW 5 BG A	EW 4 BG B
9	EW 9 BG D	EW 8 BG E	EW 7 BG A	EW 6 BG B	EW 5 BG C
10	EW 10 BG E	EW 9 BG A	EW 8 BG B	EW 7 BG C	EW 6 BG D
11	EW 11 BG A	EW 10 BG B	EW 9 BG C*	EW 8 BG D	EW 7 BG E
Bye Stand	BG B, BG C	BG C, BG E	BG D, BG E	BG E	BG A, BG B
12	EW 12 BG E	EW 11 BG D	EW 10 BG C*	EW 9 BG B	EW 8 BG A
Bye Stand	BG D	BG A	BG B, BG A	BG A, BG C	BG C, BG D

The number of tables in a web can be twice the number of rounds, but it is better to reduce the web to zero tables with two prepended subsections since this arrangement allows all boards to move in the normal manner of a Standard Mitchell Movement. To illustrate this point, the following tables show a web for ten tables playing five rounds (top) and the non-web alternative (bottom). The only difference is the boards in play—the last plays the board groups in their natural order rather than in reverse order.

Table	Round 1	Round 2	Round 3	Round 4	Round 5
1	EW 1 BG A	EW 10 BG B	EW 9 BG C	EW 8 BG D	EW 7 BG E
2	EW 2 BG B	EW 1 BG C	EW 10 BG D	EW 9 BG E	EW 8 BG A
3	EW 3 BG C	EW 2 BG D	EW 1 BG E	EW 10 BG A	EW 9 BG B
4	EW 4 BG D	EW 3 BG E	EW 2 BG A	EW 1 BG B	EW 10 BG C
5	EW 5 BG E	EW 4 BG A	EW 3 BG B	EW 2 BG C	EW 1 BG D
6	EW 6 BG D	EW 5 BG C	EW 4 BG B	EW 3 BG A	EW 2 BG E
7	EW 7 BG C	EW 6 BG B	EW 5 BG A	EW 4 BG E	EW 3 BG D
8	EW 8 BG B	EW 7 BG A	EW 6 BG E	EW 5 BG D	EW 4 BG C
9	EW 9 BG A	EW 8 BG E	EW 7 BG D	EW 6 BG C	EW 5 BG B
10	EW 10 BG E	EW 9 BG D	EW 8 BG C	EW 7 BG B	EW 6 BG A

Table	Round 1	Round 2	Round 3	Round 4	Round 5
1	EW 1 BG A	EW 10 BG B	EW 9 BG C	EW 8 BG D	EW 7 BG E
2	EW 2 BG B	EW 1 BG C	EW 10 BG D	EW 9 BG E	EW 8 BG A
3	EW 3 BG C	EW 2 BG D	EW 1 BG E	EW 10 BG A	EW 9 BG B
4	EW 4 BG D	EW 3 BG E	EW 2 BG A	EW 1 BG B	EW 10 BG C
5	EW 5 BG E	EW 4 BG A	EW 3 BG B	EW 2 BG C	EW 1 BG D
6	EW 6 BG A	EW 5 BG B	EW 4 BG C	EW 3 BG D	EW 2 BG E
7	EW 7 BG B	EW 6 BG C	EW 5 BG D	EW 4 BG E	EW 3 BG A
8	EW 8 BG C	EW 7 BG D	EW 6 BG E	EW 5 BG A	EW 4 BG B
9	EW 9 BG D	EW 8 BG E	EW 7 BG A	EW 6 BG B	EW 5 BG C
10	EW 10 BG E	EW 9 BG A	EW 8 BG B	EW 7 BG C	EW 6 BG D

==== Bowman Movement ====
The Bowman Movement is the specific case of the Web Movement described above in which the actual web consists of two tables and there is exactly one add-on block. In this movement, the next to last table plays the same group of boards as Table #1 in each round, and the last table plays the board groups in reverse order beginning with the last board group. It is theoretically possible to run this movement with only one set of boards as described in the linked article, but players will not like it, especially if there is no sit-out, because the last table shares boards with a different table in each round, creating complicated intra-round board exchanges, and there is a three-way share between Table 1 and the last two tables in the middle round if the number of rounds is odd. It would be considerably less intolerable to run this movement with just one set of boards if there is a phantom pair seated North-South at the last table, leaving the share between Table 1 and the penultimate table as the only active share. Still, it is better to use two copies of the boards so that the only active share is between the last two tables in the middle round.

==== Double Web Movement ====
Web movements are normally used in larger games in which a complete Mitchell movement is impracticable. However, they are also useful in situations in which it is desirable to have a break (for lunch, for presentation of awards or transaction of club business, or for any other reason) in the middle of a session. The use of a movement consisting of two stanzas, each of which is the basic Web Movement described above, ensures that any discussion of deals that might occur during the break will not compromise the play of those deals after the break. The following table shows a Double Web Movement for eight tables in which the first five rounds are the first Web Movement and the last three rounds are the second Web Movement. This particular movement will run smoothly with two copies of the boards in Board Groups A–E and three copies of the boards in Board Groups F-H, with Table 7 and Table 8 sharing one copy of Board Group G in Round 7, but it is best to duplicate four copies of the boards in advance if one intends to run a Double Web Movement.

Table	Round 1	Round 2	Round 3	Round 4	Round 5	Round 6	Round 7	Round 8
1	EW 1 BG A	EW 8 BG B	EW 7 BG C	EW 6 BG D	EW 5 BG E	EW 4 BG F	EW 3 BG G	EW 2 BG H
2	EW 2 BG B	EW 1 BG C	EW 8 BG D	EW 7 BG E	EW 6 BG A	EW 5 BG G	EW 4 BG H	EW 3 BG F
3	EW 3 BG C	EW 2 BG D	EW 1 BG E	EW 8 BG A	EW 7 BG B	EW 6 BG H	EW 5 BG F	EW 4 BG G
4	EW 4 BG D	EW E BG E	EW 2 BG A	EW 1 BG B	EW 8 BG C	EW 7 BG F	EW 6 BG G	EW 5 BG H
Bye Stand	BG E	BG A	BG B	BG C	BG D			
5	EW 5 BG C	EW 4 BG B	EW 3 BG A	EW 2 BG E	EW 1 BG D	EW 8 BG G	EW 7 BG H	EW 6 BG F
6	EW 6 BG B	EW 5 BG A	EW 4 BG E	EW 3 BG D	EW 2 BG C	EW 1 BG H	EW 8 BG F	EW 7 BG G
7	EW 7 BG A	EW 6 BG E	EW 5 BG D	EW 4 BG C	EW 3 BG B	EW 2 BG F	EW 1 BG G*	EW 8 BG H
8	EW 8 BG E	EW 7 BG D	EW 6 BG C	EW 5 BG B	EW 4 BG A	EW 3 BG H	EW 2 BG G*	EW 1 BG F
Bye Stand	BG D	BG C	BG B	BG A	BG E	BG G	BG F, BG H	BG G

A Double Web Movement inherits two constraints from the properties of the Web Movement described above.

- The constraint that the number of rounds in a web movement must be odd if the number of tables is odd applies separately to each stanza of a double web movement, with the consequence that the number of rounds in a double web movement must be even when the number of tables is odd.
- The requirement for East-West pairs to skip a table at the midpoint of a web with an even number of rounds also applies separately to each stanza of a Double Web Movement. If both stanzas have an even number of rounds, this results in two skips—and the number of tables must be at least two greater than the number of rounds to avoid "revenge" rounds in which pairs play against their opponents in a preceding round. However, one can avoid this situation by making the webs of unequal duration (for example, one web of five rounds and one web of three rounds rather than two webs of four rounds, as in the example above, for a total of eight rounds).

=== "One Winner" Movements ===
A "One Winner" Movement is a movement in which all entrants are part of the same scoring field, thus producing only one winner—hence the name. Howell Movements, described below, are the most varied and versatile "One Winner" movements, but they are far from the only "One Winner" movements. There are many situations in which other "One Winner" Movements are better options.

==== "One Winner" Variants of Mitchell Movements" ====
Any variant of the Mitchell Movement described above can become a "One Winner" Movement simply by scoring both directions in one field (one can have a "One Winner" Relay and Bye Stand Michell Movement or a "One Winner" Web Movement, for example). When this is done, every pair must have a separate number. The usual practice is for the stationary (North–South) pairs to retain their pair numbers while the moving (East-West) pairs add the number of tables to their starting table to get their pair number. Thus, in a "One Winner" Mitchell movement with seven tables, pairs 1–7, starting North-South at the respective tables, would be stationary and pairs 8–14, starting East–West at tables 1–7 respectively, would move. However, this movement is not ideal because the weight of opposition is far from balanced.

===== Scrambled Mitchell Movement =====
The Scrambled Mitchell (or Switched Mitchell) Movement changes the direction of play for one or more rounds at most or all of the tables in a "One Winner" variant of a Mitchell Movement, customarily achieved by rotating the orientation of the table by one seat position and thus dubbed an "arrow switch" so the stationary pairs do not physically change seats, to diminish this disparity. The pairs that start North–South remain at the same table for the entire session and the pairs who start East–West continue to move after each round, even when they play in the opposite direction. With the introduction of arrow switches, the movement becomes a Scrambled Mitchell Movement. More specifically, one can prepend the word "Scrambled" to that of the specific Mitchell Movement that gets scrambled (for example, a "Scrambled Relay and Bye Stand Mitchell Movement" or a "Scrambled Crisscross Mitchell Movement").

The selection of rounds with arrow switches affects the fairness of the result. The objective is for competitors who play against each other to have the same weighting as those who do not. If r is the number of rounds and s is the number of rounds in which all tables arrow switch, the pairs who play as opponents in the rounds that are not arrow switched have a relative influence of (r-1) for the board group played head to head, -(r-1-2s) for board groups played in opposite direction at different tables, and 2s for rounds played in the same direction for a total influence of (4s), while pairs that start in the same direction have a relative influence of (r-2s) for boards played in the same direction and -2s for boards played in opposite directions, for a total influence of (r-4s) in the absence of arrow switches on the same boards. Equating 4s=r-4s to equalize the influence yields the optimal solution s=r/8, which means that arrow switches on one-eighth (1/8) of the rounds provides the best achievable balance. Thus, the English Bridge Union (EBU) formally recommends this practice. This roughly translates into arrow switches at all tables of the last round when playing six to nine rounds and in the last two rounds when playing ten to thirteen rounds, provided that two tables are not playing the same group of boards -- the arrow switches should occur on a different group of boards, or a different pair of groups of boards, at each table, in any case. Of course, the balance is not perfect —- entrants who have arrow switches on the same group(s) of boards, including those in direct opposition on the affected rounds, will be outliers.

The principle of using arrow switches to diminish unfairness extends to all of "One Winner" Movements derived from Mitchell Movements, described below.

===== Two-Way Rover Mitchell Movement (or Two-Way Bump Mitchell Movement) =====
The Two-Way Rover Mitchell Movement, also called a Two-Way Bump Mitchell Movement, is conceptually the same as the Rover Mitchell Movement described above, but the roving pair plays in both directions, bumping the North–South pair for half of the boards and the East-West pair at the same table for the other half of the boards in each round with the first bump occurring in the second half of the first round, thus cutting the duration of the sit-out in half. These movements, which require "One Winner" scoring because the roving pair has comparisons in both directions, are most commonly used for games with either thirteen or fifteen pairs, the respective underlying movements being the "one winner" variants of a Relay and Bye Stand Mitchell Movement for six full tables and a Straight Mitchell Movement for seven full tables. In this movement, the pairs that start East–West add the number of full tables to the number of their starting tables to obtain their pair number, and the roving pair receives the highest pair number. The original versions of these movements did not use arrow switches, but a common variation incorporates arrow switches in the last round to obtain a fairer balance of comparisons. The following table shows a Two-Way Rover Mitchell Movement for 4 1/2 tables with the underlying movement being the Crisscross Mitchell Movement. Movement tables for One Winner Movements use the notation of jvk to mean that pair j plays North–South and pair k plays East–West.

Table	Round 1	Round 2	Round 3	Round 4
1	1v5 BG A1,A2	1v8 BG B1,B2	9v7 BG D1	1v8 BG C1,C2
			1v9 BG D2	
2	2v6 BG B1	2v7 BG A1,A2	2v8 BG C1,C2	2v5 BG D1,D2
	9v6 BG B2			
3	3v7 BG C1,C2	3v6 BG D1,D2	3v5 BG B1,B2	9v8 BG A1
				3v9 BG A2
4	4v8 BG D1,D2	9v5 BG C1	4v6 BG A1,A2	4v7 BG B1,B2
		4v9 BG C2		
Sit-out	9/2	4/5	1/7	3/8

If a pair arrives after either of these movements is set, it is possible to add a "party table" in the same manner as with the normal Rover Mitchell Movement described above. The pair that remains at the "party table" receives the new highest pair number and the other pairs retain the numbers already assigned. Note that each displaced pair should sit opposite its normal direction while playing at the "party table" to obtain a better balance of comparisons. Thus, both the pair that remains at the party table and the roving pair play half of the boards of each round in each direction. The following table shows the addition of a "party table" to the above movement.

Table	Round 1	Round 2	Round 3	Round 4
1	1v5 BG A1,A2	1v8 BG B1,B2	9v7 BG D1	1v8 BG C1,C2
			1v9 BG D2	
2	2v6 BG B1	2v7 BG A1,A2	2v8 BG C1,C2	2v5 BG D1,D2
	9v6 BG B2			
3	3v7 BG C1,C2	3v6 BG D1,D2	3v5 BG B1,B2	9v8 BG A1
				3v9 BG A2
4	4v8 BG D1,D2	9v5 BG C1	4v6 BG A1,A2	4v7 BG B1,B2
		4v9 BG C2		
5	10v9 BG B1	10v4 BG C1	10v1BG D1	10v3 BG A1
	2v10 BG B2	5v10 BG C2	7v10 BG D2	8v10 BG A2

===== Hesitation Mitchell Movement =====
The Hesitation Mitchell Movement is derived from the Relay and Bye Stand Mitchell Movement described above—eliminate the stationary pairs at the two tables that would share boards and compress those to tables into one, where the two moving pairs play against each other. This produces a movement in which the number of rounds is one greater than the number of tables—most commonly, five tables play six rounds, seven tables play eight rounds, or eleven tables play twelve rounds. It is also a specific Partial Howell Movement, but it is more readily described here because the numbering of pairs follows that of a "One Winner" Mitchell Movement rather than the normal convention of the Howell Movement described below.

In the Hesitation Mitchell Movement, the pairs seated North–South at every table but one are stationary for the entire movement. The hesitation table, which is usually the table with the highest number, does not have a stationary pair. The moving pairs move up one table at the end of each round, as in a Mitchell movement, except they play a round in each direction at the hesitation table before continuing on to the next table. Thus, each moving pair plays the pair that precedes it and the pair that follows it the rotation in addition to playing against each of the stationary pairs. The boards move down, passing through a bye stand directly opposite the hesitation table. The following table shows a Hesitation Mitchell Movement for five tables with arrow switches on the last round except at the hesitation table.

Table	Round 1	Round 2	Round 3	Round 4	Round 5	Round 6
1	1v6 BG A	1v5 BG B	1v10 BG C	1v9 BG D	1v8 BG E	7vs1 BG F
2	2v7 BG B	2v6 BG C	2v5 BG D	2v10 BG E	2v9 BG F	8v2 BG A
Bye Stand	BG C	BG D	BG E	BG F	BG A	BG B
3	3v8 BG D	3v7 BG E	3v6 BG F	3v5 BG A	3v10 BG B	9v3 BG C
4	4v9 BG E	4v8 BG F	4v7 BG A	4v6 BG B	4v9 BG C	10v4 BG D
5	5v10 BG F	10v9 BG A	9v8 BG B	8v7 BG C	7v6 BG D	6v5 BG E

===== Double Hesitation Mitchell Movement =====
A Double Hesitation Mitchell Movement has two points where moving pairs play North–South, though not normally at directly rotating tables, so that the number of rounds is two more than the number of tables. Thus, six tables can play eight rounds of three boards rather than six rounds of four boards. It also requires two bye stand tables, with the position of the rotations and bye stand tables chosen precisely to prevent a conflict.

==== Howell Movements ====
The Howell Movement, first developed by Edwin Cull Howell, has most pairs progress from table to table in a cycle that causes each pair to play against most or all of the other pairs for one round and each pair to play all of the boards (deals) in play during the session. All moving pairs follow the same progression, so each pair goes to the position occupied by the pair with the next lower number in the preceding round with Pair #1 going to the place occupied by the pair with the number equal to the number of rounds. The pair with the highest number sits North–South (at Table 1 in most, but not all, Howell movements) and does not move from that position, and the number of each moving pair is the round in which it sits East–West at that table. If the number of rounds is less than the number of pairs by more than one, the additional pairs are quasi-stationary—they remain at one table for the entire session, but play some rounds in each direction. The director may place a card at each table or issue a slip of paper called a guide card to each pair with the instructions for the movement.

The choice of a Howell Movement does limit options to accommodate various situations.

- The only practical way to accommodate an odd number of pairs in a Howell movement is with the addition of a phantom pair because the complexity of Howell movements makes it impracticable to configure a Howell movement for a rover.
- Except in the case of replacement of a phantom pair with a real pair, it is often impracticable to accommodate a pair that arrives after the movement is set because tables sharing boards and bye stands are likely to be mispositioned.
- Howell movements also have a limited number of stationary or quasi-stationary positions to accommodate players who have difficulty moving due to physical disabilities and other mobility impairments. The number of such positions in any Howell movement is the difference between the number of pairs and the number of rounds.
- There is also no consistency to the location of quasi-stationary pairs among the various Howell movements, so addition or removal of a table to adjust for actual attendance may change the locations of quasi-stationary places, thus requiring relocation of players with disabilities or mobility impairments right at game time.

Howell movements for four or more tables typically sequence the tables in the reverse of the order in which they play each group of boards, with stands for the intervening boards where consecutive tables do not play consecutive board groups, so that boards move down in the same manner as in a Mitchell movement, with the caveat that a few Howell movements require the table with the highest number to share boards with Table 1.

===== Complete Howell Movement =====
In a Complete Howell Movement, the number of rounds is one less than the number of pairs. The pair with the highest number is stationary, playing each of the other pairs in numerical order. The following table shows a complete Howell movement for four tables, which consists of seven rounds. The pair numbers are indicated in the same manner as for other "One Winner" Movements for games of various levels.

Table	Round 1	Round 2	Round 3	Round 4	Round 5	Round 6	Round 7
1	8v1 BG A	8v2 BG B	8v3 BG C	8v4 BG D	8v5 BG E	8v6 BG F	8v7 BG G
Bye Stand	BG B, C	BG C, D	BG D, E	BG E, F	BG F, G	BG G, A	BG A, B
2	6v3 BG D	7v4 BG E	1v5 BG F	2v6 BG G	3v7 BG A	4v1 BG B	5v2 BG C
Bye Stand	BG E	BG F	BG G	BG A	BG B	BG C	BG D
3	7v2 BG F	1v3 BG G	2v4 BG A	3v5 BG B	4v6 BG C	5v7 BG D	6v1 BG E
4	4v5 BG G	5v6 BG A	6v7 BG B	7v1 BG C	1v2 BG D	2v3 BG E	3v4 BG F

A Complete Howell Movement normally is practicable only for smaller games with a few tables, as the number of rounds becomes prohibitive for normal games with eight or more tables, but it is sometimes used in tournament situations. The following tables show the practicable Complete Howell Movements.

Normal Open Games (24–28 Deals)

Number of Tables	Number of Rounds	Boards per Round	Total Boards
3	5	5	25
4	7	4	28
5	9	3	27
7	13	2	26

Intermediate Games (18–22 Deals)

Number of Tables	Number of Rounds	Boards per Round	Total Boards
3	5	4	20
4	7	3	21
5	9	2	18
6	11	2	22

Advanced Beginner Games (14–18 Deals)

Number of Tables	Number of Rounds	Boards per Round	Total Boards
3	5	3	15
4	7	2	14
5	9	2	18

Beginner Games (8–12 Deals)

Number of Tables	Number of Rounds	Boards per Round	Total Boards
3	5	2	10

The fact that a Complete Howell Movement has only one stationary pair also limits its utility in games that must accommodate players with physical disabilities and impaired mobility.

In a Complete Howell Movement with n tables, each pair plays 2n-1 rounds—one round against each of the other pairs and 2n-2 rounds at a different table from each of the other pairs. Ideally, each pair should play n-1 rounds in the same direction and n-1 rounds in opposite directions at other tables with respect to each of the other pairs to achieve the proper balance of comparisons, and thus equal weight of opposition, for a fair movement. Complete Howell Movements that achieve this exist for reasonable even numbers of tables, but are not known to exist for any odd number of tables. When the number of tables is odd, the Complete Howell Movements that come closest to meeting this goal have one pair with n-1 comparisons with each of the other pairs and 2n-1 pairs that have n-2 comparisons with n-1 of the other pairs, n-1 comparisons with 1 of the other pair, and n comparisons with the remaining n-1 of the other pairs. The consistency of this pattern clearly suggests a fundamental mathematical limitation, but the present author has not yet found mathematical proof thereof. However, this relationship strongly suggests that a pair that is an extreme outlier in terms of playing ability or ranking compared to the rest of the field—either particularly strong or particularly weak—should be seated in the position that has the perfectly balanced comparisons to avoid skewing the results of the rest of the field.

The Complete Howell Movement for three tables, like the example shown in the following table, has irregular movement of the boards and a "free for all" round in which all tables share the last group of boards after all pairs play the first four groups of boards in the first four rounds because this situation does not have enough degrees of freedom to do otherwise. The director normally will need to move the boards when running this movement, as most players don't know the non-standard movement of the boards. The Extended Hesitation Mitchell Movement, described below, is usually a better choice for games with three tables—it runs more smoothly because the boards move in a normal manner in the first four rounds and it offers better accommodation for players with disabilities or impaired mobility.

Table	Round 1	Round 2	Round 3	Round 4	Round 5
1	6v1 BG A	6v2 BG B	6v3 BG C	6v4 BG D	6v5 BG E
2	4v3 BG B	5v4 BG C	1v5 BG B	2v1 BG C	3v2 BG E
3	2v5 BG D	3v1 BG D	4v2 BG A	5v3 BG A	1v4 BG E
(Bye Stand)	BG C	BG A	BG D	BG B	-

After Round	Board Rotation
1	Triangle: Table 1 -> Bye Stand -> Table 2 -> Table 1; BG D Remains at Table 3
2	Swap: Table 1 <-> Table 2; Swap: Bye Stand <-> Table 3
3	Triangle: Table 1 -> Table 2 -> Bye Stand -> Table 1; BG A Remains at Table 3
4	All Boards Come Out of Play; Replaced by Board Group E at All Tables

The "free for all round" in this movement is so-called because it often results in a frenzy of players scrambling to get a board that they have not yet played when there is only one set of the boards. This round runs far more smoothly with two copies of the affected group of boards (place about two-thirds of the boards on each table with instructions to pass the first board or two, as required, to the next lower table upon completion thereof) and most smoothly with three copies (so each table has its own). If there is only one copy of these boards, the director should manage the order of play at each table to ensure that each table completing a board moves on to the available board with the fewest completed plays. Otherwise, two tables inevitably end up needing the same board for their last play, forcing one table to wait while the other plays it.

In addition to the "free for all round" and the irregular board movements, the fact that each round consists of one-fifth of the number of boards in play greatly amplifies the imbalance of comparisons that is common to all Complete Howell Movements with an odd number of tables.

===== Partial Howell Movement (or "Three Quarter" Howell Movement) =====
A Partial Howell Movement, also sometimes called a "Three Quarter Howell Movement" even though the number of rounds is not exactly 3/4 of the number of rounds in a Complete Howell Movement, has fewer rounds and fewer board groups than a Complete Howell Movement, but more rounds than a Complete Mitchell Movement, for the same number of tables. The shortfall from a Complete Howell Movement creates an equal number of quasi-stationary positions at "swivel tables" for the pairs with numbers greater than the number of rounds but less than the number of pairs. Each quasi-stationary pair remains at the same table throughout the session, but plays North–South in some rounds and East–West in other rounds, usually achieved by arrow switches at the respective tables rather than by having the quasi-stationary players physically change seats. All stationary and quasi-stationary pairs play against each of the moving pairs but not against each other, while the moving pairs don't play against an equal number of the other moving pairs. The following table shows the Partial Howell Movement for six tables playing eight rounds supplied by the ACBLscore® scoring program published by the American Contract Bridge League. Pair 12 is truly stationary, playing North-South at Table 1 throughout. The quasi-stationary pairs are Pair 11 at Table 2, Pair 10 at Table 3, and Pair 9 at Table 4. In this particular movement, three subsets of entrants do not play against the other members of their own subset. These subsets consist of the stationary and quasi-stationary pairs (Pair 9, Pair 10, Pair 11, and Pair 12), the odd moving pairs (Pair 1, Pair 3, Pair 5, and Pair 7), and the even moving pairs (Pair 2, Pair 4, Pair 6, and Pair 8).

Table	Round 1	Round 2	Round 3	Round 4	Round 5	Round 6	Round 7	Round 8
1	12v1 BG A	12v2 BG B	12v3 BG C	12v4 BG G	12v5 BG E	12v6 BG F	12v7 BG G	12v8 BG H
2	11v8 BG B	11v1 BG C	11v2 BG D	11v3 BG E	4v11 BG F	5v11 BG G	6v11 BG H	7v11 BG A
3	10v6 BG C	10v7 BG D	8v10 BG E	1v10 BG F	2v10 BG G	3v10 BG H	10v4 BG A	10v5 BG B
4	5v9 BG D	6v9 BG E	9v7 BG F	9v8 BG G	1v9 BG H	2v9 BG A	9v3 BG B	9v4 BG C
5	7v4 BG E	8v5 BG F	1v6 BG G	2v7 BG H	3v8 BG A	4v1 BG B	5v2 BG C	6v3 BG D
6	3v2 BG F	4v3 BG G	5v4 BG H	6v5 BG A	7v6 BG B	8v7 BG C	1v8 BG D	2v1 BG E
(Bye Stand)	BG G, H	BG H, A	BG A, B	BG B, C	BG C, D	BG D, E	BG E, F	BG F, G

The development of most published Partial Howell Movements occurred well before the mathematical analysis described above determined the full weight of opposition, with proper accounting of boards played in opposite directions. Thus, the developers set arrow switches at the tables with the quasi-stationary pairs so the stationary and quasi-stationary pairs would have direct comparisons on about half of the boards—which the mathematical analysis has subsequently proven to be wrong. The result is a hideous imbalance in the fairness of the movement. This issue does not affect published Complete Howell Movements described, but only because all pairs of entrants play against each other in a Complete Howell Movement so the correction affects the weight of opposition of all pairs of entrants in the same way. The next table shows the frequencies of number of comparisons reported by the ACBLscore® scoring program for this movement and the subsequent table shows the pairs that represent the most extreme outliers as reported by the ACBLscore® scoring program, with asterisks (*) indicating pairs that do not play in direct opposition at the same table. The pairings with asterisks in the first three rows and the pairings without asterisks in the last two rows are the most egregiously imbalanced in this movement.

Rounds Compared	Frequency	Rounds Compared	Frequency
0	1	4	25
1	4	5	10
2	5	6	3
3	17	7	1

Rounds Compared	Pairs
0	6&9
1	*1&7, 3&11, *4&6, *5&7
2	1&10, 1&11, 2&9, 2&10, 2&11
6	*1&5, 1&6, *10&11
7	4&9

===== Scissors Howell Movement =====
The Scissors Howell Movement cuts each board group in half, with each half moving independently, in the same manner as the Scissors Mitchell Movement described above. This movement is most useful with three tables, where the boards can move in a manner that offsets the imbalance in comparisons for a Complete Howell Movement with an odd number of tables discussed above, amplified by the fact that each round plays 20% of the boards. The following table shows a Scissors Howell Movement for three tables in which the half board groups move in a complementary manner so that the imbalance of the upper half countering the imbalance of the lower half, creating a balanced movement.

Table	Round 1	Round 2	Round 3	Round 4	Round 5
1	6v1 BG A1,A2	6v2 BG B1,B2	6v3 BG C1,C2	6v4 BG D1,D2	6v5 BG E1,E2
2	5v2 BG C2,D2	1v3 BG D2,E2	2v4 BG E2,A2	3v5 BG A2,B2	4v1 BG B2,C2
3	3v4 BG B1,E1	4v5 BG C1,A1	5v1 BG D1,B1	1v2 BG E1,C1	2v3 BG A1,D1

A normal scissors movement requires each complete board group to consist of an even number of boards so it can split exactly in half—with the consequence that a scissors movement with five rounds would have to play either twenty (20) or thirty (30) boards. However, it is possible to play either 24 or 26 boards with the above movement by varying the size of the board subgroups as shown in the following table—each table plays five boards in each of the first four rounds and four or six boards respectively in the last round.

Total Boards Played	20	24	26	30
Board Subgroup A1	Boards 1–2	Boards 1–2	Boards 1–3	Boards 1–3
Board Subgroup A2	Boards 3–4	Boards 3–5	Boards 4–5	Boards 4–6
Board Subgroup B1	Boards 5–6	Boards 6–8	Boards 6–7	Boards 7–9
Board Subgroup B2	Boards 7–8	Boards 9–10	Boards 8–10	Boards 10–12
Board Subgroup C1	Boards –10	Boards 11–13	Boards 11–12	Boards 13–15
Board Subgroup C2	Boards 11–12	Boards 14–15	Boards 13–15	Boards 16–18
Board Subgroup D1	Boards 13–14	Boards 16–17	Boards 16–18	Boards 19–21
Board Subgroup D2	Boards 15–16	Boards 18–20	Boards 19–20	Boards 22–24
Board Subgroup E1	Boards 17–18	Boards 21–22	Boards 21–23	Boards 25–27
Board Subgroup E2	Boards 19–20	Boards 23–24	Boards 24–26	Boards 28–30

It is theoretically possible to configure a Scissors Howell Movement for more than three tables, but there is no practical reason to do so. There are complete Howell movements for four tables that are correctly balanced, and a Scissors Howell Movement for five or more tables would require play of too many boards to be of practicable use in any normal situation.

==== Hybrid movement ====
Whenever an event of two sessions draws only enough entrants to form one section, the normal practice is to play a Mitchell Movement in the first session, followed by separate Howell or equivalent movements for the entrants in the first session's North-South and East–West fields in the second session. Thus, an event with sixteen pairs would play a Relay and Bye Stand Mitchell Movement (eight rounds) in the first session followed by separate Complete Howell Movements (seven rounds) for each of the original fields in the second session, so that each entrant would play against each of the other entrants in one session or the other. A Hybrid Movement takes the same approach to form two stanzas within a single session. A complete Hybrid Movement is functionally equivalent to a Complete Howell Movement, but it has several pairs that don't change tables after every round—thus providing better accommodation for players with disabilities and mobility impairments.

The following table shows a complete Hybrid Movement for four tables playing seven rounds. The first four rounds are a Scrambled Mitchell Movement in which each of the pairs that start East–West move to each of the four tables and play each of the pairs who start North–South, with arrow switches at three of the four tables. In the last three rounds, the pairs that started North–South play a Complete Howell Movement at Table 1 and Table 2 while the pairs that started East–West play another Complete Howell Movement at Table 3 and Table 4. The configuration of the arrow switches in the first four rounds and the positioning of pairs in the last three rounds conspire to balance the movement perfectly—each pair of entrants plays one group of boards against each other at the same table, three groups of boards in the same direction at different tables, and three groups of boards in opposite directions at different tables. This particular movement works best with two copies of the boards, but it can run with Table 1 sharing boards with Table 2 and Table 3 sharing boards with Table 4 throughout if necessary.

Table	Round 1	Round 2	Round 3	Round 4	Round 5	Round 6	Round 7
1	1v5 BG A	1v6 BG B	1v7 BG C	1v8 BG D	1v4 BG E	1v3 BG F	1v2 BG G
2	2v6 BG A	2v5 BG B	8v2 BG C	7v2 BG D	3v2 BG E	2v4 BG F	4v3 BG G
3	3v7 BG B	8v3 BG A	6v3 BG D	3v5 BG C	5v7 BG F	5v6 BG G	5v8 BG E
4	4v8 BG B	7v4 BG A	4v5 BG D	4v6 BG C	6v8 BG F	8v7 BG G	7v6 BG E

Note that hybrid movements often provide much better accommodation for players with physical disabilities and mobility impairments than the equivalent Complete Howell Movement. In this example, Pair 1 is completely stationary, Pair 2 changes tables just once, Pair 4 changes tables twice, and both Pair 3 and Pair 5 change tables just three times, each. The equivalent Complete Howell Movement has one stationary pair, requiring all other pairs to change tables after every round but one.

In the case of an odd number of tables, it is best for the first part of a Hybrid Movement to operate as a Scrambled Hesitation Mitchell Movement, as that reduces the number of stationary pairs to an even number permitting separate Howell movements for the stationary and rotating pairs. In the second part of the movement, the stationary pairs play a Complete Howell Movement while the moving pairs play a Partial Howell Movement in which they "miss" the pairs that they played at the hesitation table. With three tables, this movement becomes the Extended Hesitation Mitchell Movement described below.

===== Extended Hesitation Mitchell Movement =====
In a game of just three tables, the Hesitation Mitchell Movement that would form the first part of a Hybrid Movement pits each pair against four of the other five pairs in the first four rounds. This reduces the second stage to one round in which each pair plays the fifth group of boards against the pair that it did not play in the first five rounds of the movement. The fifth round is really an extension of the Hesitation Mitchell Movement rather than the parallel Howell movements that normally form the second part of a hybrid movement; hence the difference in name. The following table shows this Extended Hesitation Mitchell Movement.

Table	Round 1	Round 2	Round 3	Round 4	Round 5
1	1v4 BG A	1v3 BG B	1v6 BG C	1v5 BG D	1v2 BG E
(Bye Stand)	BG B	BG C	BG D	BG A	-
2	2v5 BG C	2v4 BG D	3v2 BG A	6v2 BG B	4v6 BG E
3	3v6 BG D	6v5 BG A	5v4 BG B	4v3 BG C	5v3 BG E

The Extended Hesitation Mitchell Movement is functionally equivalent to the Complete Howell Movement for three tables shown above, but it generally runs more smoothly because the rotating pairs and the boards move in a regular manner for the first four rounds. It has the additional advantage that Pair 1 is fully stationary, Pair 2 changes tables only once, and Pair 6 changes tables only twice—generally acceptable, or at least tolerable, accommodations for players who have some degree of mobility impairment—whereas the Complete Howell Movement requires five of the six pairs to change tables after every round. The balance of comparisons and the existence of a "free for all round" are the same as in any Complete Howell Movement for three tables, so there is no "down side" whatsoever to using this movement instead of the Complete Howell movement. The previous discussion pertaining to the "free for all round" in a Complete Howell Movement for three tables is also applicable here—it is best to provide three copies of the boards in Board Group E so each table can have its own copy.

=== Choice of movements ===
There are two or more possible movements to choose from for any combination of tables and session length. The choice depends on the preferences of the organizers.

- Complete Howell Movements ensure that each entrant plays against all of the other entrants, but the number of rounds and boards varies and may not be convenient. All pairs, except one, move after every round, which slows down the move especially if one table is slow, and there is only one stationary table, which is problematic if some players have limited mobility. The move on each round is complex and table cards or guide cards are essential. Also, except for filling a phantom position, they offer no flexibility to add entrants who arrive after the movement is set.
- Normal Mitchell Movements have a stationary pair at each table, and they are considerably simpler than Howell movements and thus easier to run so there is no need for special table mats or guide cards. It is also quite easy to add a table to most Mitchell movements if entrants arrive after the movement is set.
- Hesitation Mitchell Movements and Partial Howell Movements are intermediate between the cases above. If the number of rounds is one more than the number of tables, the Hesitation Mitchell Movement is much simpler and thus much easier to run.

Complete Howell Movements are most convenient for small numbers of tables and Mitchell movements are best for large numbers of tables. In a typical club session of around 3 hours, a Howell can be used for seven or fewer tables and a Mitchell for four or more tables. Up to 11 tables, useful alternatives are given by Partial Howell Movements, Hesitation Mitchell Movements (odd numbers of tables), and Double Hesitation Mitchell Movements (even numbers of tables). However, the director needs to consider circumstances such as the need for stationary places to accommodate players with disabilities in making the final selection.

The present authors prefer the following movements, described above, for normal games of 2½ to 8 tables.

==== 2½ or 3 Tables ====
- 20 Boards: Extended Hesitation Mitchell Movement (simplest), Complete Howell Movement, or Scissors Howell Movement (best balanced); all 5 rounds of 4 boards
- 24 Boards or 26 Boards: Scissors Howell Movement with Modified Board Subgroups; 4 rounds of 5 boards + 1 round of 4 or 6 boards
- 25 Boards: Extended Hesitation Mitchell Movement (simplest) or Complete Howell Movement; 5 rounds of 5 boards

==== 3½ or 4 Tables ====
- 20 Boards: Crisscross Mitchell Movement, 4 rounds of 5 boards
- 21 Boards: Hybrid Movement or Complete Howell Movement, 7 rounds of 3 boards
- 24 Boards: Crisscross Mitchell Movement, 4 rounds of 6 boards
- 28 Boards: Hybrid Movement or Complete Howell movement, 7 rounds of 4 boards

==== 4½ Tables ====
- 18 Boards: Complete Howell Movement, 9 rounds of 2 boards
- 24 Boards: Two-Way Rover Mitchell Movement, 4 rounds of 6 boards (3-board sit-out)
- 27 Boards: Complete Howell Movement, 9 rounds of 3 boards

==== 5 Tables ====
- 18 Boards: Complete Howell Movement, 9 rounds of 2 boards
- 24 Boards: Hesitation Mitchell movement, 6 rounds of 4 boards
- 25 Boards: Complete Mitchell Movement, 5 rounds of 5 boards
- 27 Boards: Complete Howell Movement, 9 rounds of 3 boards

==== 5½ or 6 Tables ====
- 22 Boards: Complete Howell Movement, 11 rounds of 2 boards
- 24 Boards: Relay and Bye Stand Mitchell Movement, 6 rounds of 4 boards, or Double Hesitation Mitchell Movement, 8 rounds of 3 boards
- 27 Boards: Partial Howell Movement, 9 rounds of 3 boards

==== 6½ Tables ====
- 21 Boards: Complete Mitchell Movement, 7 rounds of 3 boards
- 24 Boards: Two-way Rover Mitchell Movement, 6 Rounds of 4 Boards (2-board sit-out), or Hesitation Mitchell Movement, 8 rounds of 3 boards
- 26 Boards: Complete Howell Movement, 13 rounds of 2 boards

==== 7 Tables ====
- 21 Boards: Complete Mitchell Movement, 7 rounds of 3 boards
- 24 Boards: Hesitation Mitchell movement, 8 rounds of 3 boards
- 26 Boards: Complete Howell movement, 13 rounds of 2 boards
- 28 Boards: Complete Mitchell movement, 7 rounds of 4 boards

==== 7½ Tables ====
- 24 Boards: Relay and Bye Stand Mitchell Movement with Virtual Share (missing pair chosen to be stationary at a sharing table), 8 rounds of 3 boards
- 28 Boards: Two-Way Rover Mitchell Movement, 7 rounds of 4 boards (2-board sit-out)

==== 8 Tables ====
- 24 Boards: Relay and Bye Stand Mitchell Movement or Double Web Movement, 8 rounds of 3 boards

=== Swiss Pairs competitions ===
In a Swiss Pairs competition, a large number of entrants play individual head-to-head matches in each round, typically over 6, 7 or 8 boards, all using the same sets of boards. The matchpoint scores on each board are compared across the entire field, and the opposing pairs' total scores for the round are converted into Victory Points (VPs). Match assignments for the next round are based on the cumulative VP score, as for Swiss Teams, see below. This is a form of barometer movement.

== Movements for individual games ==
Individual games started declining in popularity among competitive Bridge players long ago, leading to their gradual disappearance from tournaments. In the American Contract Bridge League (ACBL), the New England Bridge Conference (ACBL District 25) discontinued the last regional tournament that featured individual events due to low attendance with no intent to resurrect it. Nevertheless, individual games are still legal.

=== Rainbow Movement ===
The Rainbow Movement for individual games the analog of the Mitchell Movement for pairs games. In a rainbow movement, each player always sits in the same direction, producing separate North, South, East, and West scoring fields and four winners, one in each direction. In a complete Rainbow movement, the number of tables is equal to the number of rounds. The players seated North are stationary, and the players seated South, East, and West move in a manner that's different from one another and different from the movement of the boards after each round.

==== Regular Rainbow Movement ====
The Regular Rainbow Movement requires that the number of tables be a prime number—that is, a number whose only positive integer divisors are itself and one. In the Regular Rainbow Movement, the players in each direction move in the same manner after each round. The following movement is one example.

- East players move UP TWO tables.
- South players move UP ONE table.
- West players move DOWN TWO tables.
- Boards move DOWN ONE table.

Any permutation of these movements will work.

The following table shows the Regular Rainbow Movement for five tables. The notation for players is <North>&<South>v<East>&<West>.

Table	Round 1	Round 2	Round 3	Round 4	Round 5
1	1N&1Sv1E&1W BG A	1N&5Sv4E&3W BG B	1N&4Sv2E&5W BG C	1N&3Sv5E&2W BG D	1N&2Sv3E&5W BG E
2	2N&2Sv2E&2W BG B	2N&1Sv5E&4W BG C	2N&5Sv3E&1W BG D	2N&4Sv1E&3W BG E	2N&3Sv4E&1W BG A
3	3N&3Sv3E&3W BG C	3N&2Sv1E&5W BG D	3N&1Sv4E&2W BG E	3N&5Sv2E&4W BG A	3N&4Sv5E&2W BG B
4	4N&4Sv4E&4W BG D	4N&3Sv2E&1W BG E	4N&2Sv5E&3W BG A	4N&1Sv3E&5W BG B	4N&5Sv1E&3W BG C
5	5N&5Sv5E&5W BG E	5N&4Sv3E&2W BG A	5N&3Sv1E&4W BG B	5N&2Sv4E&1W BG C	5N&1Sv2E&4W BG D

==== Irregular Rainbow Movement ====
In an irregular rainbow movement, the movement of the South, East, and West players changes each round. These movements require considerable engineering, and the North players do not necessarily remain stationary. The following table shows a Rainbow Movement for eight tables.

Table	Round 1	Round 2	Round 3	Round 4	Round 5	Round 6	Round 7	Round 8
1	1N&1Sv1E&1W BG A	1N&3Sv5E&8W BG B	1N&5Sv6E&4W BG C	1N&7Sv2E&5W BG D	1N&6Sv8E&7W BG E	1N&8Sv4E&2W BG F	1N&2Sv3E&6W BG G	1N&4Sv7E&3W BG H
2	2N&2Sv2E&2W BG B	4N&2Sv8E&5W BG C	2N&6Sv5E&3W BG D	8N&2Sv7E&4W BG E	2N&5Sv7E&8W BG F	4N&5Sv1E&3W BG G	2N&1Sv4E&5W BG H	8N&5Sv2E&6W BG A
3	3N&3Sv3E&3W BG C	3N&1Sv7E&6W BG D	7N&3Sv4E&6W BG E	7N&1Sv8E&3W BG F	3N&8Sv6E&5W BG G	3N&6Sv2E&4W BG B	7N&8Sv5E&4W BG A	7N&6Sv1E&5W BG B
4	4N&4Sv4E&4W BG D	6N&8Sv2E&3W BG E	8N&4Sv3E&5W BG F	6N&4Sv5E&2W BG G	4N&7Sv5E&6W BG H	6N&3Sv7E&5W BG A	8N&7Sv6E&3W BG B	6N&7Sv4E&8W BG C
5	5N&5Sv5E&5W BG E	5N&7Sv1E&4W BG F	5N&1Sv2E&8W BG G	5N&3Sv6E&1W BG H	5N&2Sv4E&3W BG A	5N&4Sv8E&6A BG B	5N&6Sv7E&2W BG C	5N&8Sv3E&7W BG D
6	6N&6Sv6E&6W BG F	8N&6Sv4E&1W BG G	6N&2Sv1E&7W BG H	4N&6Sv3E&8W BG A	6N&1Sv3E&4W BG B	8N&1Sv5E&7W BG C	6N&5Sv8E17W BG D	4N&1Sv6E&2W BG E
7	7N&7Sv7E&7W BG G	7N&5Sv3E&2W BG H	3N&7Sv8E&2W BG A	3N&5Sv4E&7W BG B	7N&4Sv2E&1W BG C	7N&2Sv6E&8W BG D	3N&4Sv1E&8W BG E	3N&2Sv5E&1W BG F
8	8N&8Sv8E&8W BG H	2N&4Sv6E&7W BG A	4N&8Sv7E&1W BG B	2N&8Sv1E&6W BG C	8N&3Sv1E&2W BG D	2N&7Sv3E17W BG E	4N&3Sv2E&7W BG F	2N&3Sv8E&4W BG G

=== Shomate Movement ===
The Shomate Movement is analogous to the Howell Movement for pair games—the moving players change direction. In a complete Shomate Movement, the number of rounds is one less than the number of players and only one player is stationary, usually seated North at Table 1. The stationary player usually has the highest player number, partnered with the player whose number matches the number of the round. The moving players move in the same cycle, each following the player with the next lower number.

The following table shows the complete Shomate Movement for two tables playing seven rounds. This particular movement must operate as a barometer game because that's the only way to get comparisons on each deal with only two tables, but Shomate movements for more than two tables need not have this constraint.

Table	Round 1	Round 2	Round 3	Round 4	Round 5	Round 6	Round 7
1	8&1v6&2 BG A	8&2v7&3 BG B	8&3v1&4 BG C	8&4v2&5 BG D	8&5v3&6 BG E	8&6v4&7 BG F	8&7v5&1 BG G
2	5&7v3&4 BG A	6&1v4&5 BG B	7&2v5&6 BG C	1&3v6&7 BG D	2&4v7&1 BG E	3&5v1&2 BG F	4&6v2&3 BG G

Shomate movements tend not to be practicable for games with more than three or four tables because they require too many rounds.

== Movements for team competitions ==
The movement selected for a team game depends upon the type of competition and the number of entrants. The simplest format is a head-to-head match between two teams of four, where no movement is necessary except sharing the boards.

=== Types of Multiple Teams competition ===
The movement for a multiple teams competition depends upon the number of entrants. If the number of entrants is small enough, each team should play each of the other entrants — called a "Round Robin" or "all-play-all" format. However, when the number of teams is large the number of boards per match will be small. When this is not desirable, some other form of arranging competitors to play must be used. The most common are Knockouts and Swiss. In both of these, teams play head-to-head matches of a convenient number of boards in each round. In Knockouts, match winners advance to the next round; the losers are eliminated from the event. In a "Swiss Teams" competition, the first match may be assigned randomly and subsequent matches assigned dynamically based upon the outcome of the previous matches across the entire field. Another possibility is to divide the entrants into brackets based on ability or ranking, and they play the other entrants in their own bracket in a "Round Robin" format.

=== Standard Swiss Teams competitions ===
In a Swiss Teams event, the normal practice is to assign matches for subsequent rounds dynamically by the cumulative total of Victory Points awarded based upon the margin of victory or loss in the preceding rounds. The tournament director examines the record of each team and assigns pairs of teams with similar records to oppose each other in the next round, subject to the constraint that no team can play against another team in more than one round. The "Swiss" terminology originated from its use in multi-round chess tournaments. This causes stronger teams to come into competition with other stronger teams that are doing well in the fight for the top, weaker teams to come into competition with other weaker teams in the fight to the bottom, and average teams to gravitate toward the middle of the standing (because an average team that beats a weaker team by a significant margin then must play against a stronger team and vice versa). Most computer scoring programs now generate subsequent matches automatically, with algorithms that are sophisticated enough to ensure that undesirable assignments won't arise in the later rounds.

An event or bracket with an odd number of entrants requires that at least three of the teams play interleaved matches as round-robins, either in a single round or in a pair of rounds (unless there is a sit-out). In the first case, three teams play two half-length matches during the round (e.g. 4 boards each when all other competitors are playing 8 board matches); this is sometimes known as a "short triple". In the second case, each set of interleaved matches requires two rounds of play, known as a "long triple". This means that the number of rounds must be even. Also, because the teams involved will not have results to compare for future pairings for two rounds, in the later rounds it is desirable to avoid assigning the leading teams to a "long triple". In both cases, each team's North–South pair plays one side of one match while its East–West pair plays one side of another match in the first half of the interleaved matches. In the second half, each pair play the other side of the match that the other pair played in the first half. The team then scores both matches.

The following table shows interleaved matches for three teams. The teams are designated by lower case letters in this table rather than numbers because their numbers don't necessarily match the numbers of the tables, but the movement really consists of the second and third rounds a Standard Mitchell Movement for three tables. In competitions in which the players shuffle and deal the cards for each match, the cards are shuffled for the first round but not for the second round in this format.

Table	First round	Second round
1	xvz BG A	xvy BG B
2	yvx BG B	yvz BG C
3	zvy BG C	zvx BG A

=== Round Robin Movements ===
In a Round Robin Movement, the number of matches is one fewer than the number of entrants so each team plays against each of the other teams. Scoring may be by International Match Points (IPMs) or Victory Points (VPs). With more than six teams in an event of one session and with more than ten teams in an event of two sessions, Victory Point scoring tends to be less appropriate because the matches play too few deals.

==== Even numbers of teams ====
When a Round Robin event or bracket has an even number of teams, all of the teams can play each other in head-to-head matches. The following table shows the simplest arrangement of matches for four teams.

Round	Match A	Match B
1	1v2	3v4
2	1v3	2v4
3	1v4	2v3

The movement of the boards can present challenges to ensure that the two opposing pairs of the two teams in a match play the same boards even though they meet in different rounds. The straightforward American Whist movement requires an odd number of teams, so it only works if one pair of teams do not play each other. If a true all-play-all movement is required, various ingenious alternatives, such as the Thurner movement, have been devised, as described in the EBU Movement Manual.

==== Odd numbers of teams ====
An odd number of entrants must play each other in rings of interleaved matches or using the American Whist League Movement described in the section on Pair Movements (above) with the first round removed.

- Three tables normally use the format for three interleaved matches shown above.
- The format recommended by the American Contract Bridge League (ACBL) for five teams consists of two rings of interleaved matches shown in the following table, as this allows the players to score the first two matches after the second round. The last two rounds can use the same deals as the first two rounds if the groups of boards move as shown in the table. The ACBL recommends shifting the home tables (North-South pairs) of four of the teams after the first ring of matches, as shown in the table, so that the North-South and East-West pairs of each team are not playing at adjacent tables.

Table	Round 1	Round 2	Round 3	Round 4
1	1v4 BG A	1v3 BG C	1v5 BG D	1v2 BG E
2	2v5 BG B	2v4 BG D	4v3 BG B	4v5 BG C
3	3v1 BG C	3v5 BG E	2v1 BG E	2v3 BG A
4	4v2 BG D	4v1 BG A	5v4 BG C	5v1 BG D
5	5v3 BG E	5v2 BG B	3v2 BG A	3v4 BG B

- A round robin for seven or nine teams could operate as three or four rings, respectively, of interleaved matches, but the more prevalent practice is for three teams to play interleaved matches and the remaining teams to play head-to-head matches in each pair of rounds. With nine teams, there is also the option to play four three-way interleaved matches as shown in the following table.

	Rounds 1&2	Rounds 3&4	Rounds 5&6	Rounds 7&8
First Ring	Teams 1, 2, 3	Teams 1, 4, 7	Teams 1, 5, 9	Teams 1, 6, 8
Second Ring	Teams 4, 5, 6	Teams 2, 5, 8	Teams 2, 6, 7	Teams 2, 4, 9
Third Ring	Teams 7, 8, 9	Teams 3, 6, 9	Teams 3, 4, 8	Teams 3, 5, 7

The American Whist League (AWL) Movement, described above as a pair movement, also can be employed for a round robin of five, seven, or nine tables simply by removing its first round. Alternatively, the first round of this movement can be employed to duplicate boards since the boards at each table are precisely the boards that the respective team will not play in the competition.

=== Knockout competition ===
In a knockout competition, the entrants are typically divided into brackets of nine to sixteen teams and assigned initial positions within each bracket by a random draw for starting positions on the bracket chart. Each round of matches may consist of either head-to-head or three-way matches, or some combination thereof, each of which is one round in duration. A three-way match consists of three round-robin "half-matches" (so each side of a three-way match plays half the number of deals of a head-to-head match in the same round). The winner of each head-to-head match continues into the next round while the loser is eliminated. In a three-way match, two teams may continue with one team eliminated or vice versa. The brackets typically are configured to come down to four teams in the semifinal round of competition.

Standard knockout competitions usually consist of four rounds.

- In a full knockout competition, each round is a separate session with each head-to-head match consisting of twenty-four deals, usually played over two days with two sessions on each day. The pairs eliminated in the third round tie for third and fourth places overall. The final round assigns first place overall to the winner and second place overall to the loser.
- In a Compact Knockout competition, there are two rounds in each session with each head-to-head match consisting of twelve deals, usually played on the same day. The teams that lose in the first round play consolation matches in the second round, but cannot place overall. The teams that lose in the third round play head-to-head in the fourth round, with the winner placing third and the loser placing fourth overall.

Various championship events may consist of more sessions and more matches with a larger single field.

=== Soloway (Hybrid) Team Competition ===
The Soloway Team Competition is a two-stage hybrid event in which the first stage is a standard Swiss Team event, from which the top teams continue into a Knock-Out competition in the second stage that determines the overall winner. This format can run as either a single competition, with several rounds of elimination in the knock-out stage, or as a bracketed event in which each bracket has its own qualifying and final rounds. If the event is bracketed, the qualifying stage typically is a Round Robin format so that each team plays against each of the other teams in its bracket.

=== Board-a-Match (BAM) Movements ===
A Board-a-Match (BAM) event is a Swiss Team competition in which each board is deemed to be a separate match, with a winner and a loser. These events typically consist of each team playing a few boards against each of the other teams, using a movement similar to that for pair games but engineered so any two teams play the same boards in both directions. The most common team movement is the American Whist League (AWL) movement described above, with the first round removed (so a team's North-South pair does not play against its own East-West pair). However, the teams may shuffle and deal the boards that would be at their table in Round 1 of the AWL Movement, which are boards that they won't play, before moving for the first round of actual competition.

For an even number of tables, things become more difficult. A simple solution is to use an American Whist movement with an even number of rounds but with one or more teams not playing each other, which is not ideal. One or two of the moves between rounds will be different, to avoid board/team conflicts. There are alternative movements that are better balanced but more complex, see EBU Movements Manual.
