= Edwin C. Howell =

American whist player

Edwin Cull Howell (1860–1907) was a whist player in America in the late nineteenth century, at a time when the card game bridge was evolving from the card game whist. He devised the movement system bearing his name, for cards and players first used in duplicate whist and subsequently in duplicate bridge. He was also an accomplished mathematician and chess player.

== Personal life ==
Little is known about Howell's personal life. He seems to have been an enigmatic figure. Born on 21 April 1860 in Nantucket, Massachusetts, he was the son of a clergyman in a home that looked askance on playing cards!. His parents were George Howell and Frances Sarah Howell (née Cull), and he had three siblings.

Howell was schooled at the Charlier Institute in New York City preparatory to entering Harvard in 1877. Howell learned to play cards, poker first, at Harvard College where he also excelled at chess and was playing championship standard whist by 1881. He left Harvard in 1881 before completing his degree and taught in a private school in Asbury Park New Jersey. (Note: The Summer North American Bridge Championships were held in Asbury Park each year from 1930 to 1941) He returned to Harvard in 1883, graduating with honors in mathematics for his AB (Bachelor of Arts) degree.

Moving to Baltimore, he taught mathematics at Johns Hopkins University (1884–85) and in two private schools, also becoming the amateur chess champion of that city. In 1887, he became a journalist and joined the staff of The Daily News in Baltimore. By 1889, he was on the Boston Herald where he worked for the next 14 years. In July 1903, he became assistant in the National Almanac Office of the U.S. Navy in Washington DC, a position he held until his death in 1907.

A suggestion that he became a professor of mathematics at MIT was investigated by a PhD student but no evidence to that effect emerged.

== Whist and its Laws ==
Partnering L M Bouvé at the Fourth Annual Congress of the American Whist League in 1894, he won the straight whist match (in a field of 124) for his Boston club, the American Whist Club of Boston.

Howell contributed greatly to The Whist Reference Book of 1898 and is quoted as one of the authorities on the short suit game. He was an early user of the terminology North-South and East-West (NS and EW) to designate the opposing partnership positions at table, rather than the then more popular methods, a method now in common usage in duplicate bridge clubs. He was also much involved in discussions to determine best systems of play and the laws of whist at the Fifth Annual Congress of the American Whist League.

== Movements ==
In duplicate bridge, there are two principal schemes for rotating the position of the players and the boards:

- The ‘Mitchell Movement’ named after John T. Mitchell, who published it in 1891 in Duplicate Whist by McClurg of Chicago. Mitchell wrote several books on whist.
- The ‘Howell Movement’ named after Edwin C. Howell, who worked it out for all numbers of teams from 6 through 46 probably using the mathematical device which later became known as Room Square. Howell Movement plans are readily available on the internet or as printed cards from bridge supply shops. Howell's was pronounced by far the best system ever used in a tournament for fours (i.e. teams of four) in 1895 and an improvement on Mitchell's earlier movement method. During the summer of 1897 Howell published his "Method of Duplicate Whist for Pairs" consisting of indicating cards with instructions. Other prominent whist players of the time had contributed to discussions on methods, but Howell was the chief proponent.

== Publications ==
At least four books by Howell are available, three republished in recent years:

- The Howell Method of Duplicate Whist for Pairs: With the Latest Approved Methods of Scoring Under the Multiple and Improved Match Systems (Classic Reprint, as republished by Forgotten Books")
- Whist Openings: A Systematic Treatment of the Short-Suit Game (Classic Reprint, as republished by Forgotten Books") originally published before 1896
- The Minor Tactics of Chess (1894) by Franklin Knowles and Edwin C. Howell
- The Minor Tactics Of Chess: A Treatise On The Deployment Of The Forces In Obedience To Strategic Principle by Franklin Knowles Young and Edwin C. Howell. republished by Leopold Classic Library. This book was originally published prior to 1923.

== Other sources ==
- The Whist Reference Book: Wherein Information Is Presented Concerning the Noble Game, in All Its Aspects, After the Manner of a Cyclopedia, Dictionary, and Digest All Combined in One (1898?) by William Mill Butler republished Hansebooks 2017 and Forgotten Books 2015 (Hardback) and 2018 (Paperback)
