= Caddy (bridge) =

In bridge, the assistant to a tournament director

In duplicate bridge, a caddy is an assistant to the tournament director with primary responsibility for:

1. collecting pick-up slips (score slips) after each round where required by the event format, and
2. moving boards between tables.

In addition, the caddy dresses the tables (putting out the boards, electronic scoring devices or score slips, pencils and private score sheets), picks up player entry forms and generally assists the Director as required.
