= History of contract bridge =

The earliest recorded form of Bridge is Biritch (or "Russian Whist") published by John Collinson in England in 1886. Collinson was a British railway engineer and financier who played the game in Constantinople in the early 1880s. Bridge historian Thierry Depaulis concluded that the game likely developed within diplomatic circles in Istanbul around the 1860s. Variants of the game were played in Greece and Constantinople before spreading to the French Riviera by the 1870s. This version with 1NT worth 12 points was adopted for the official rules of Bridge in Paris, in London at the Portland Club in 1894

The history of contract bridge may be dated from the early 14th-century and the invention of Trifoni in Italy, a trick taking game where a card was turned over to pick a trump suit which was the ancestor of all the games in the Triomphe family.

== Origins ==
According to the Oxford English Dictionary, the word bridge is the English pronunciation of "biritch" adopted in France in the early 1890s. Bridge rapidly replaced Whist, which had been played for centuries, in the mid-1890s.

Bridge had significant from Russian Whist. Dealer chose the trump suit, or nominated his partner to do so; the top call was No Trumps (biritch); and the dealer's partner's hand became dummy. The score could be doubled and redoubled; scoring a game in one deal required 3 odd tricks in No Trumps, 4 in Hearts, or 5 in Diamonds. There were 40 and 20 point slam bonuses.

Despite the popularity of whist, this game, and variants of it, bridge and bridge-whist, became popular in the United States and the UK in the 1890s.

In 1904 auction bridge was first played at The Bath Club. It featured a competitive auction to decide a contract with penalties for failing to make it. In 1908/9 The Bath and Portland Club developed an official set of rules for Auction Bridge in England. In America Milton Work et al. in NY experimented with scoring and decided that the 10 point 1NT in Collinson's game was superior. They created Royal Auction Bridge With the New Count in which the scoring table was NT 10; Spades 9, Hearts 8; Diamonds 7; Clubs 6 and Dealer could pass. It didn't last long because Harold Stirling Vanderbilt's Contract Bridge was first played in 1925.

In Contract Bridge only tricks bid and made counted towards Game and Slam. Vulnerability also added more variety to the scoring and increase the strategy. By the end of the decade Contract Bridge was the dominant form of the game played in Clubs. With the arrival of Duplicate Bridge it was retronymed Rubber Bridge.

== See also ==
- History of the Laws of Contract Bridge
