= Sacrifice (bridge) =

In bridge, bid announced despite the expectation that it's unlikely to make

In duplicate bridge, a sacrifice (a save in common usage) is a deliberate bid of a contract that is unlikely to make in the hope that the penalty points will be less than the points likely to be gained by the opponents in making their contract. In rubber bridge, a sacrifice is an attempt to prevent the opponents scoring a game or rubber on the expectation that positive scores on subsequent deals will offset the negative score.

Owing to the difference in the methods of scoring between duplicate and rubber bridge, a sacrifice bid in rubber bridge is much less likely to be advantageous and so strategies differ between the games. Comparable strategy differences exist between Matchpoints scoring and IMPs scoring games.

== Scoring context ==
=== Sacrificing against game contracts ===
Sacrificing Against a Game Contract
Opponents' probable game points		Our probable penalty points in a doubled contract						
Their vulnerability	Points	Tricks down when we are vulnerable			Tricks down when we are not vulnerable			
Their vulnerability	Points	1	2	3	1	2	3	4
Vulnerable	600 or 620	200	500	800	100	300	500	800
Not vulnerable	400 or 420	200	500	800	100	300	500	800

In duplicate bridge scoring, if the opponents bid and make a game contract, it yields them 600 or 620 points when they are vulnerable and 400 or 420 points when they are not vulnerable, depending upon the strain and assuming no overtricks. Accordingly, a sacrifice will be advantageous if the resultant loss in points is less than these amounts.

Determination of the most number of tricks that can be lost to satisfy this condition is dependent upon the relative vulnerability of each partnership, i.e. whether one, the other, both or neither are vulnerable. The determination is also based upon the assumption that the opposition will double the sacrifice bid thereby increasing the penalty points. The table at the left summarises the various scenarios and outcomes.

In summary, when the opponents are likely to make a game contract, a sacrifice bid which is doubled is viable (i.e. one will still receive a positive relative duplicate score) if one can go down no more than:

- three tricks if vulnerability is favourable (shown in green)
- two if vulnerability is equal (shown in yellow)
- one if vulnerability is unfavourable (shown in red)

Similar reasoning can be drawn for sacrifices against potential slam and partscore contracts and cases where one assumes that the contract will not be doubled.

=== Sacrificing against small slam contracts ===
Sacrificing Against Small Slam Contracts
Opponents' expected game points			Sacrificer's expected maximum penalty points and undertricks			
Vulnerability	Contract	Points	Not vulnerable		Vulnerable	
Vulnerability	Contract	Points	Points	Undertricks	Points	Undertricks
Not vulnerable	6NT	990	800	4	800	3
Not vulnerable	6♥ or 6♠	980	800	4	800	3
Not vulnerable	6♣ or 6♦	920	800	4	800	3
Vulnerable	6NT	1440	1400	6	1400	5
Vulnerable	6♥ or 6♠	1430	1400	6	1400	5
Vulnerable	6♣ or 6♦	1370	1100	5	1100	4

When the opponents are likely to make a small slam contract, a sacrifice bid which is doubled is viable if one can go down no more than

- six tricks if relative vulnerability is favourable against a small slam in a major or notrump
- five tricks if relative vulnerability is favourable against a small slam in a minor
- five tricks if relative vulnerability is equal where both sides are vulnerable against a small slam in a major or notrump
- four tricks if relative vulnerability is equal where both sides are vulnerable against a small slam in a minor
- four tricks if relative vulnerability is equal where both sides are not vulnerable against any small slam
- three tricks if relative vulnerability is unfavourable against any small slam

=== Sacrificing against grand slam contracts ===
Sacrificing Against Grand Slam Contracts
Opponents' expected game points			Sacrificer's expected maximum penalty points and undertricks			
Vulnerability	Contract	Points	Not vulnerable		Vulnerable	
Vulnerability	Contract	Points	Points	Undertricks	Points	Undertricks
Not vulnerable	7NT	1520	1400	6	1400	5
Not vulnerable	7♥ or 7♠	1510	1400	6	1400	5
Not vulnerable	7♣ or 7♦	1440	1400	6	1400	5
Vulnerable	7NT	2220	2000	8	2000	7
Vulnerable	7♥ or 7♠	2210	2000	8	2000	7
Vulnerable	7♣ or 7♦	2140	2000	8	2000	7

When the opponents are likely to make a grand slam contract, a sacrifice bid which is doubled is viable if one can go down no more than

- eight tricks if vulnerability is favourable
- seven tricks if both vulnerable
- six tricks if both not vulnerable
- five tricks if vulnerability is unfavourable.

== Strategy ==
A sacrifice most often occurs when both sides have found a fit during bidding (eight cards or more in a suit), but the bidding indicates that the opponents can make a game or slam contract. Also, it is possible to perform an advance sacrifice, when it is more or less clear that the opponents have a fit somewhere and greater strength. For example, after the partner opens 1♦ and RHO doubles, the following hand is suitable for a bid of 5♦, outbidding opponents' major suit game in advance:

♠ 8 3 ♥ 4 ♦ Q 10 8 5 4 2 ♣ Q J 6 4

As seen in the table above, vulnerability significantly affects the sacrifice: success is most likely if the opponents are vulnerable but the sacrificing side is not. At equal vulnerabilities, sacrifices are less frequent, and vulnerable sacrifices against non-vulnerable opponents are very rare and often not bid deliberately. Also, the specific duplicate scoring method affects the tactics of sacrifice – at matchpoint scoring, −500 or −800 (down three or four) against −620 is a 50/50 probability for a top or bottom score, but at international match points (IMPs) it can gain 3 IMPs (120 difference) but lose 5 (180 difference), making it less attractive.

However, if it turns out that the sacrificing side misjudged, and that the opponents' contract was unmakeable (or unlikely to make), the sacrifice is referred to as a false or phantom one. A false sacrifice can cost heavily, as the sacrificing side has in effect turned a small plus into a (potentially large) minus score.

The Law of total tricks can be a guideline as to whether the sacrifice can be profitable or not.

Sacrifices are practically always made in a suit contract; sacrifices in notrump are extremely rare, but can occur, as in the following deal:

		♠♤	A 6		
		♥	K 8 7 4		
		♦	J 9 7 4		
		♣♧	Q J 5		
♠♤	Q 10 8 5 3	N W E S		♠♤	K J 9 7 2
♥	A Q J 6 3	N W E S		♥	10
♦	—	N W E S		♦	5 2
♣♧	K 8 4	N W E S		♣♧	10 9 6 3 2
		♠♤	4		
		♥	9 5 2		
		♦	A K Q 10 8 6 3		
		♣♧	A 7		

The bidding starts:

West	North	East	South
			1♦
2♦^{1}	2NT	4♠	?

^{1} Michaels cuebid, indicating both majors.

South can see that East-West have a huge spade fit and that it's quite possible that they can make 4♠. However, the best sacrifice seems to be 4NT rather than 5♦; it requires a trick less and there is no indication that 5♦ would provide more tricks than 4NT. Indeed, 4NT is down one and 5♦ down two.

=== Other considerations in sacrifices ===
The scoring matters a lot in sacrifices. Matchpoints scoring vs. IMP scoring makes a very significant difference in sacrifice decisions.

Kit Woolsey suggests that the following three conditions should all be met for a sacrifice to make sense in Matchpoint scoring:

- The field is going to bid the game the opponents reached.
- The said game is very likely to make.
- Your doubled sacrifice is likely to not go down too much (i.e. maximum 1 down in unfavorable vul, max 2 in equal, and max 3 in favorable. Slam values are much higher)

== See also ==
- Glossary of contract bridge terms
- Preempt
