= Deutscher Bridge Verband =

German association for bridge players

The Deutscher Bridge-Verband (DBV, German Bridge Association) is an association for bridge players and bridge clubs in Germany. It was founded in 1949 and comprises 14 regional associations with about 29,000 members (out of around 500,000 bridge players in Germany) and about 500 clubs. The DBV promotes bridge in Germany and represents the country at the international level.

So far, it has been played at national level:

- 75 German pair championships
- 71 German team championships
- 58 German mixed pair championships
- 12 German mixed Team Championships

Marie Eggeling has been the president of DBV since August 2020.
