= John T. Mitchell =

John Templeton Mitchell (1854–1914) was born in Scotland on April 3 1854 (Note: Caveat - an online search of National Records of Scotland has failed to come up with anyone of this name in birth or census (1861 or 1871) records of the time) and emigrated to the US in 1875, where he settled in Chicago where he found employment as a bank clerk and became a naturalised American citizen. He became interested in duplicate whist at the age of 34, in 1888, when he read of a duplicate match in his native Glasgow and was instrumental in the formation of the Chicago Duplicate Whist Club. His name is synonymous with the Mitchell Movement used in many bridge clubs today.

== Whist development ==
Mitchell became known as the "Father of Duplicate Whist" because of the movements of boards and players he designed for tournaments, a design included in his 1891 book on Duplicate Whist. This relatively simple movement was refined in discussion with others during that decade in an attempt to truly compare skill at cards rather than pure chance. His contemporary, E C Howell, developed a different system of movements for pairs in 1897.

J T Mitchell contributed to the original Whist Reference Book, and much to discussions on tactics of the game, and the Laws of Whist. Mitchell was elected to the post of Treasurer of the American Whist League, at that time representing Chicago, Illinois.

== Publications ==
Some books written by Mitchell have been republished in recent years

- Duplicate Whist 1897 (Classic Reprint) Paperback – Republished by Forgotten books (2018). Also by Cornell University Library (2009)
- Duplicate Whist: Its Rules and method Of Play – Being A Full Description of The New And Scientific game Which Equalizes The Strength Of Opposite Hands, Thus Reducing The Element Of Luck To A Minimum. Originally published 1891. Republished by Obscure Press (2009)

== Other sources ==
- The Whist Reference Book: Wherein Information Is Presented Concerning the Noble Game, in All Its Aspects, After the Manner of a Cyclopedia, Dictionary, and Digest All Combined in One (1898?) by William Mill Butler republished Hansebooks 2017 and Forgotten Books 2015 (Hardback) and 2018 (Paperback)
- Official Encyclopedia of Bridge 5th edition (1994) ISBN 0-943855-48-9
- Ian Anderson & Tony Crilly (2013) The mathematician who drove Whist forward: William Henry Whitfeld (1856–1915), BSHM Bulletin: Journal of the British Society for the History of Mathematics, 28:3, 132–142, DOI: 10.1080/17498430.2013.788891 (Link to Article here) which mentions John Mitchell
