= Duplicate bridge =

Variant of contract bridge card game

Duplicate Bridge
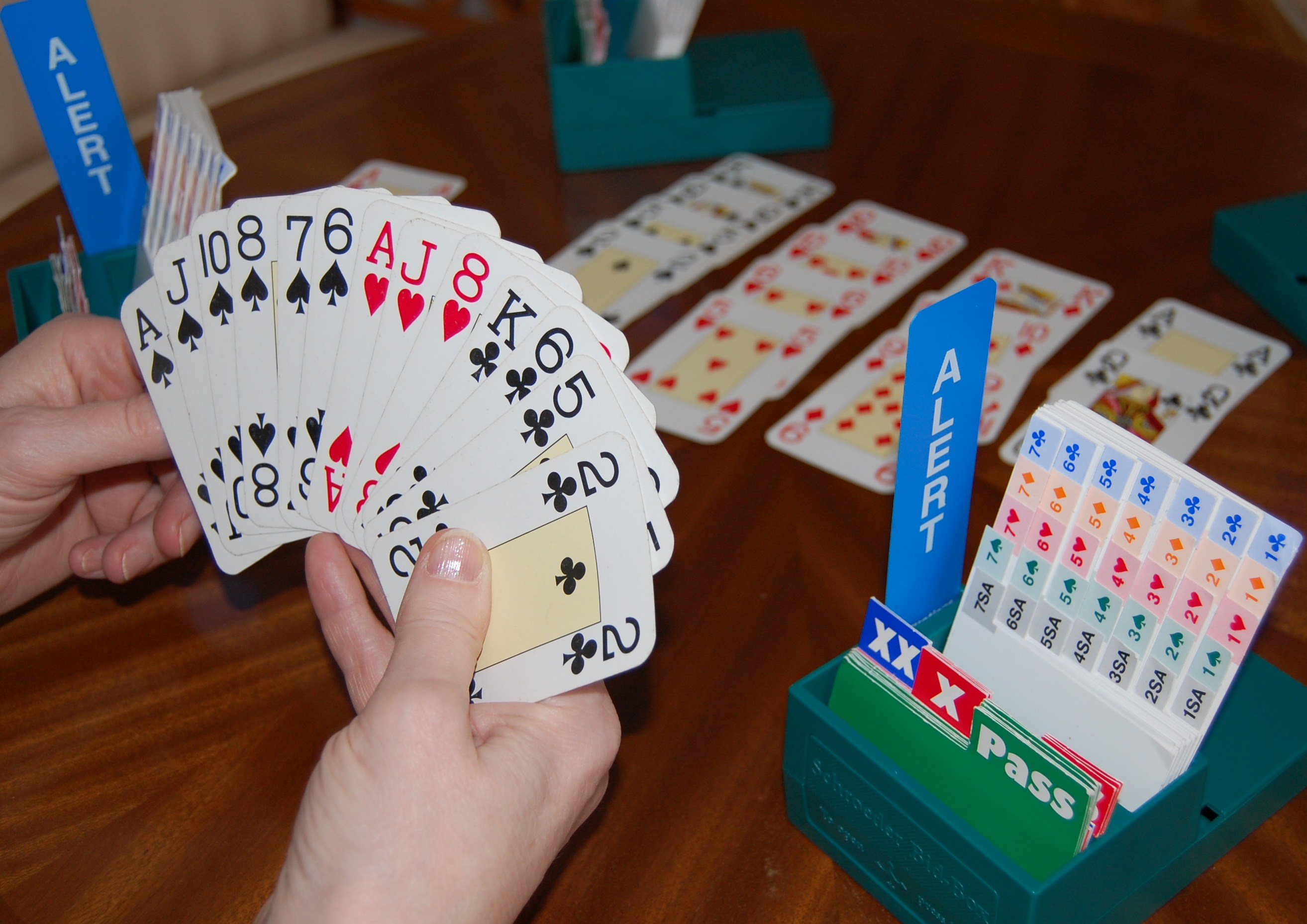
- Bridge declarer play in a duplicate tournament
- Alternative names: Tournament bridge
- Type: Trick-taking
- Players: 8 or more
- Skills: Memory, tactics, probability, communication
- Cards: 52
- Deck: French
- Rank (high→low): A K Q J 10 9 8 7 6 5 4 3 2
- Play: Clockwise
- Playing time: WBF tournament games = 7.5 minutes per deal
- Chance: Very Low

Related games
- Contract bridge

Duplicate bridge is a variation of contract bridge where the same set of bridge deals (i.e., the distribution of the 52 cards among the four hands) are played by different competitors, and scoring is based on relative performance. In this way, every hand, whether strong or weak, is played in competition with others playing identical cards, and the element of skill is heightened while that of chance is reduced. This stands in contrast to Bridge played without duplication, where each hand is freshly dealt and where scores may be more affected by chance in the short run.

Four-way card holders known as bridge boards are used to enable each player's hand to be preserved from table to table, and final scores are calculated by comparing each pair's result with others who played the same hand.

In duplicate bridge, players normally play all the hands with the same partner, and compete either as a partnership (in a 'Pairs tournament') or on a team with one or more other partnerships ('Teams tournament' - players are usually allowed to change partner within their team at any point if they wish). 'Individual tournaments' also exist, in which players change partnerships regularly during the tournament and are ranked on their personal performance.

== History ==
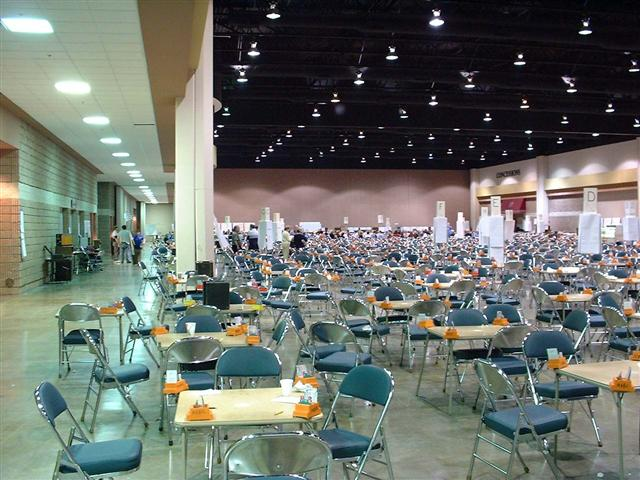
Duplicate bridge tournament playing area

The origins of duplicate bridge are based on the emergence of duplicate whist in the game of whist. In the introduction to his book Duplicate Whist, the author comments on the early emergence of duplicate whist:

The writer has it on good authority that it was played in Berlin and Paris as far back as 1840, and later in Philadelphia and New York...

— John T. Mitchell, Duplicate Whist. Chicago, IL: A. C. McClurg and Co. 1891. OCLC 9153326.

Mitchell also recounts the Cavendish experiment of 1857 to demonstrate the merits of duplicate whist in reducing the element of luck and to distinguish between the skill levels of better and poorer players. Cavendish concludes:

...that this experiment does not altogether eliminate luck, as bad play sometimes succeeds. But by far the greater part of luck, namely, that due to the superiority of winning cards, is by the plan described quite got rid of.

— Cavendish (Henry Jones), Card Table Talk

Initially, owing to the early clumsy mechanics of card resorting to reconstruct the hands of a just played deal, the problems resulting from errors made in the transferring of cards between tables, and the unaccustomed movement of players between tables and the resultant slower pace of play, duplicate whist did not gain instant popularity. Nevertheless, the evolution of duplicate whist continued and the procedures and apparatus (known as trays or now, more commonly, boards) for more conveniently maintaining and transferring the cards of each deal for replay had been greatly improved so that by the 1890s duplicate's popularity had become widespread. In turn, as the game of whist was superseded by contract bridge, so was duplicate whist by duplicate bridge.

== Game types ==
=== Pairs game ===
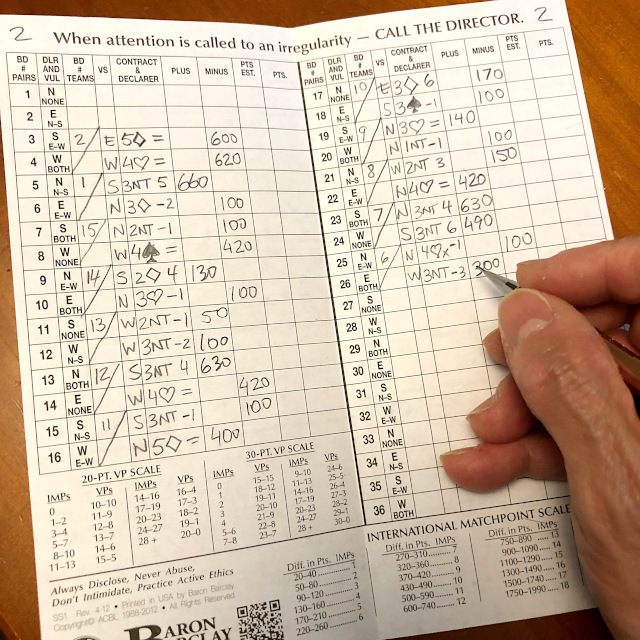
Score sheet for ACBL pairs tournament

In a pairs tournament, each deal is played a number of times by different players, after which all the scores are compared.

The tournament consists of a number of rounds; in each round, a number of boards (i.e. hands), usually two to five, is played against the same opponents. A session typically consists of between 24 and 28 boards in total, but this can vary. Typically around eight boards are played per hour, so a typical session will last 3 hours or slightly more. If there is an odd number of pairs, one pair will have to sit out in each round. Most events are single-session, but tournament events can consist of two, four or more sessions.

Immediately after a board is played, the North player writes the result of that board on the travelling sheet, and the East player checks it. The information recorded includes at least the (identifying) numbers of the North-South and East-West pairs and the score achieved. Usually the contract and the number of tricks won are also recorded, and sometimes also the opening lead. Sometimes the cards in each hand are also written on the traveller, which is useful in case the cards are inadvertently mixed up. The traveller is contained within and travels with the board. This means that the players learn how they did up to that point on each board. This might be regarded as an advantage or as a disadvantage: information about their relative standing in the field might induce a pair to change their strategy (e.g. aggressive or conservative bidding and play) on the remaining hands. Alternatively, the scores for each round may be recorded on pickup slips collected during the event to enable the scorer to start to process the results before the end of the session, so that the results can be announced soon after the end of the session. A modern development is an electronic data-entry device on each table that transmits the results wirelessly to the director's computer. This allows results to be posted at a club or on a website very quickly after the end of play.

The usual form of overall scoring for a pairs tournament is Matchpoint scoring; occasionally IMP scoring is used instead.

Every pair plays against a different opposing pair in each successive round, depending on the size of the field. After each round, some or all of the players reseat themselves according to a prescribed "movement", so that each pair opposes a different pair in each round; the boards are also moved. The movement must be set up so that each pair does not play more than one round against the same opponents; and, of course, does not play the same board more than once.

The tournament director will select the movement depending on the number of pairs playing, to allow them to play the desired number of boards each, without repetition. Tournaments with up to about a dozen tables are usually played either as a Mitchell movement (each North/South pair plays against all or most East/West pairs) or a Howell movement (each pair plays against all or most other pairs, and switches between North/South and East/West as required). A Howell movement is typically used if there are fewer than about 7 tables. With larger fields the tournament can be split into separate sections (every section operates its own separate movement, but the scores are compared across all sections); each section normally plays a Mitchell movement.

=== Table movements ===
The Mitchell movement is the most common. The North-South pairs remain stationary. After each round, the East-West pairs move to the next higher-numbered table and the boards move to the next lower table. If the number of tables is odd, every E-W pair will play different boards against every N-S pair after the full circle. In case of an even number of tables, the East-West pairs are told to skip a table after about half the rounds so that they do not encounter boards that they have already played; alternatively ("Relay-bystand Mitchell"), a "bystand" (playerless table) is introduced, while the two tables farthest from the bystand share the boards in each round (the "relay"). Usually, the bystand is placed halfway through the field (e.g. between Tables 5 and 6 if there are 10 tables) and the relay between Table 1 and the last table. A "perfect" Mitchell is seven, nine, or thirteen tables, with four, three, or two boards per round respectively: all players play all boards, and all pairs of each direction play against all pairs of the other direction. A variation of the Mitchell movement employs "arrow-switching". This means that for approximately one-eighth of the boards played, the N-S pairs play the E-W cards and vice versa. This variation is used when it is desired to have one winner rather than two winners (see below).

The Howell movement is sometimes used instead, usually when there are a relatively small number of tables. This movement is more complicated and varies according to the total number of pairs. All boards and most pairs move after every round according to guide cards placed on the tables, or carried by the players (usually one pair, or sometimes more, remain stationary). The Howell is sometimes considered a fairer test than the Mitchell, because each pair faces all or nearly all of the other pairs, not just the pairs sitting in the opposite direction. However the fairness of a movement depends not only on who one plays against but also to a considerable extent on one's indirect opponents, i.e. those who play the same cards as you do. The Howell also tends to be more error-prone than the Mitchell due to its greater complexity. Ideally the number of rounds will be one less than the number of pairs competing, so that each pair plays one round against every other pair. Each round will usually consist of either 2, 3, or 4 boards. However, sometimes this produces an inconvenient total number of boards to be played. To avoid this, a "reduced Howell" or "three-quarter Howell" movement is often played, with fewer rounds and usually with more than one stationary pair, so that the number of rounds plus the number of stationary pairs equals the total number of pairs.

Less common is the Chalfant movement. In this movement, the boards remain stationary while the players move according to guide cards. This requires significantly more physical tables, because several tables are not in play on any given round. (Like the Howell movement, this movement is typically used when there is a relatively small number of players, typically no more than 12 pairs. Also like the Howell movement, this movement produces a single winner and pairs face all or almost all of the other pairs in play.) This movement has the advantage that pairs are often moving to a table that was not in use on a previous round, so a slow pair does not delay as many other pairs as in a Howell. Also, for several sizes, this movement is technically superior in that more pairs face all other pairs than in the corresponding Howell movement. This movement has the disadvantage of requiring a larger number of physical tables, and thus more space. It also requires the players to carry guide cards with them and consult them, while the guide cards usually remain on the tables for Howell movements.

Whatever movement is used, if the number of pairs is odd, obviously one pair must sit idle during each round; that situation is referred to as a bye or sit out. In that undesirable case, the missing pair (sometimes called the phantom pair) is treated as if it exists, i.e. the movement is set up for (number of actual pairs + half a table). The phantom pair may be North-South, East-West or an arbitrary pair number in a Howell movement. In a Mitchell movement, having an East-West phantom pair is advantageous in that there are non-phantom players at each table responsible for correct movement of the boards. During the movement, one pair in each round will sit out ("play" against the phantom pair). Since, as result, pairs will usually play unequal numbers of boards, their final results are normally scaled in the final calculation (known as factoring), or less commonly they might be awarded "bye points" for that round (normally, a result slightly above average).

Another arrangement for an odd number of pairs is called a bump or rover movement, in which the number of tables is rounded down to (number of actual pairs - 1)/2. In a Mitchell movement, the extra pair normally sits out the first round and then, according to a schedule, substitutes for a different North-South pair for each subsequent round (the "bumped" pair having a sit out for that round). The extra pair are frequently referred to as the "rover pair" because, unlike the other North-South pairs, they move at each round. In particular, the bump is preferable to the sit out for 11½ tables: it allows every pair to play at least 24 boards while having only 33 boards in play.

In a Howell movement, the extra pair normally sit out the first round and are then allocated fixed seats where they remain for all subsequent rounds. Any position other than that which would normally be occupied by a stationary pair will do. The extra pair thus displace, or "bump", a different pair (those who would normally move to those seats) at each round. The extra pair are still colloquially known as the "rover pair" even though, in a Howell, they do not actually rove.

A better alternative is for the phantom pair to be allocated a stationary position. This enables all the boards to be played the same number of times (so that all the pairs play all the boards) and the movement in many cases to be completely fair between all the non-stationary pairs.

Trials are usually reserved for high-level competitions (such as regional and national championships, invitation tournaments etc.). There, a fixed number of pairs (usually 16) play a full round-robin tournament (Swiss can be also used to shorten the tournament) with relatively long matches (8-32 boards) against each other, the entire tournament lasting for two to four days. One session consists of only one round, with boards circulating among the tables and pairs remaining seated. Results are calculated after each round using IMP or Calcutta scoring, converted to victory points (VP), and added up to the running score. The pair with highest VP score becomes the winner.

=== Teams game ===
In a teams tournament, two pairs normally constitute a team. (Teams of five or six members are often permitted, but each set of boards will only be played by two pairs in the team, i.e. four members of the team.) If there are just two teams, they compete using two tables and having one pair from each team seated at each table, in opposite directions. (For example, Team A may sit North-South at table 1 and East-West at table 2; then Team B would sit East-West at table 1 and North-South at table 2.) Similar arrangements apply if there are more than two teams in the competition. Depending on the number of teams competing and the structure of the tournament, a relatively larger number of boards may be played in each round of the movement (usually six to eight for "Swiss teams", usually 12, 24, or more for knockout events). The boards are moved (sometimes by a caddy) so that they are all eventually played at both tables (or more if there are four teams or more).

Suppose Team A plays Team B. The first time a hand is played, one partnership from Team A (say) takes the North-South cards and one partnership from Team B takes the East-West cards; when the hand is played again, it is played by the other two partnerships, but this time with Team A holding the East-West cards and Team B holding the North-South cards. Of course the teams may not discuss the deals between the two plays. Normally, each of the two tables deals and plays half of the scheduled boards at the beginning of the match, and they are exchanged halfway through the match. (If there are more than two teams, the movement is more complicated.) After each deal has been played twice, the scores for each deal are compared, and a net score is given depending on the net total score from the two times the deal was played. For example, if one pair scores +620 on a deal, and their teammates score -600, then the team's net score on that deal is +20.

Several forms of scoring are then used to calculate the overall winner of the match with IMP scoring and Board-a-match (resembling matchpoint scoring) being the most common.

- At IMP scoring, the net score is converted using an IMPs table that "compresses" big differences in score. For instance if the net score was 20, as in the above example, this would be converted to a score of 1 IMP, while a net score of say 450 (e.g. +620 versus +170) is worth 10 IMPs. If the match between the two teams is part of a larger competition, then usually the total difference in IMPs in a single match is again converted into so-called victory points or VPs. The VPs awarded to each team in their matches are summed up to determine the overall team ranking.
- At Board-a-match (BAM), each hand has equal weight; each hand is won, lost, or tied.

Also used are:

- Total point score, known as aggregate scoring in England, uses no conversion whatsoever; total-point scoring was more popular in the past, and is rarely used today. Only one event in England, the Hubert Phillips Bowl for Mixed Pivot teams, uses this form of scoring. Similarly, there is one event in Wales, the Cambria Cup for Mixed Pivot Teams.
- Patton scoring combines the methods of Board-a-match and Total point scoring.

=== Individual events ===
In an individual event, each player is paired with a different partner in each round. Individual events are less popular and much less common than pairs and teams events.

There are various methods for assigning partners. In one method, which can be regarded as an extension of the Mitchell movement, a given set of players always sit North, another set sit South, another set sit East, and a final set always sit West. This can be used to arrange that each pair consists of a relatively experienced or skilled player, and a relatively inexperienced player.

Individual events are more complex to run, as the movement and scoring are more complicated. They ideally require that players establish understandings in bidding and play methods with new partners in every round; this adds to the challenge of the game given the nuances of many bidding and signaling systems and conventions. There is an additional element of luck compared to other types of events: a good player may be less successful with a poor partner on a difficult board than others are with the same partner on a simpler one.

Scoring is usually match points, but IMP pairs scoring can be used.

== Scoring ==
=== Scoring and tactics ===
The type of scoring significantly affects a pair's (or team's) tactics. For example, at matchpoints, making one more overtrick than everybody else on a board gives the same result (the top) as making a slam that nobody else bid, whereas at IMP scoring, the difference comes down to 1 IMP (30 points) in the first case, but 11 or 13 IMPs (500 or 750 points) in the second case. In general, matchpoint scoring requires a more "vivid" and risk-taking approach, while IMP scoring requires a more cautious approach. People that dislike IMP scoring sometimes refer to it as "cowardly", while people that dislike matchpoint scoring sometimes refer to it as "not bridge". The main features of the tactics are:

- Matchpoints
  - Overtricks are important.
  - Safety play is often neglected in the hunt for overtricks.
  - Thin games and slams are avoided.
  - Sacrifices are more frequent; e.g. going down 500 points on a doubled contract is a good result if the opponents can score 620 points for a game.
  - Penalty doubles are more frequent, as they increase the score for the penalty. For example, "the magic 200" refers to the situation when a vulnerable pair's contract is doubled and goes one down — the score of 200 will outscore almost all part-score contracts played at other tables.
  - Playing in higher-scoring denominations (notrump or major suits) is important, as it may lead to an extra 10 or 20 points.
  - Due to the above, it is often unclear to the defence, and sometimes even to declarer, what their goals are. Thus mastering matchpoints play requires additional skills (sometimes referred to as "not bridge" by those who dislike it) to those required to play IMPs.
- IMPs
  - Overtricks are not important, and it is not worth a significant risk of losing a game bonus of 300–500 points = 8–11 IMPs (or to a lesser extent a part score of 110 to 190) for the potential 1 IMP gain for an overtrick.
  - Safety play is very important, for the same reason.
  - Thin games and slams are often bid. Bidding a game with 40 percent probability of success vulnerable and 45 percent nonvulnerable, or a small slam with 50 percent probability, is worth the risk, and anything over that increases the probability of a positive IMP score in the long run.
  - Sacrifices are less frequent, as they may be risky and the relative gain can be less. Conceding -500 points rather than -620 if you might have got the opponents down for +100 is less worthwhile. However, if you can hold the penalty to -100, this is attractive.
  - Penalty doubles are less frequent, as they may be risky. Often, when an opponents' contract is doubled, it turns declarer's attention to the bad lie of cards, and may induce him to take a successful line of play that he would not take otherwise.
  - The contract itself sets a clear goal for both the defence and declarer, frequently allowing a deeper level of counter-plays between them.

=== Contrast with rubber bridge ===
Duplicate bridge, especially matchpoint games, differs significantly from rubber bridge in scoring technique, and therefore occasionally somewhat in tactics for bidding and play. Whereas the goal in rubber bridge is to win more points than the pair of people you are playing against, in duplicate bridge the goal is to do better than other pairs playing exactly the same cards. Because of this, strategies are different. In rubber (as in IMP scoring), 30 points above the line for an overtrick is unimportant and hardly worth risking a set. In match-points duplicate, it is common for those 30 points to mean you get a top score instead of average – and may be worth risking going down. In rubber, an occasional 800-point penalty is disastrous, but in matchpoints it is no worse than any other bottom score. International match points is in the middle of these extremes. Huge penalties are worse than small penalties, but 30 point differences are only moderately important.

A more subtle difference is in the bidding of partscore hands. In duplicate bridge, once a pair recognizes that they are playing for part score (less than a game), their objective is to win the auction with the minimum bid. In rubber bridge, it may occasionally be desirable to bid above this minimum as points below the line may be needed to complete a game.

Duplicate bridge also has the unique advantage of largely neutralizing a run of bad luck with the cards because a pair that has had poor hands all night may still have the highest score for the session – as long as they play their cards more skillfully than the other pairs with the same poor hands. That said, in such cases these pairs will probably have had fewer opportunities to exercise those skills, and their results may depend more heavily on the expertise of their opponents.

== Governance ==
=== Organization ===
The worldwide sports governing body in bridge is the World Bridge Federation, formed 1958 as the joint effort of delegates from Europe, the United States, and South America. In world bridge as of 2009, Europe and North America, or the EBL and ACBL, are the two largest of eight world Zones or zonal organizations, with about 400,000 and 160,000 registered players.

Zone	Organization	Area	Member Countries	Total Membership
1	European Bridge League (EBL)	Europe	47	393,164
2	American Contract Bridge League (ACBL)	North America	3	160,912
3	Confederacion Sudamericana de Bridge (CSB)	South America	10	4,384
4	Bridge Federation of Asia & the Middle East (BFAME)	Asia	13	9,188
5	Central American & Caribbean Bridge Federation (CAC)	Central America	20	1,384
6	Pacific Asia Bridge Federation (PABF)	Pacific Asia (Far East)	12	71,129
7	South Pacific Bridge Federation (SPBF)	Australia and Oceania	4	47,286
8	African Bridge Federation (ABF)	Africa	14	6,398

Registered European players are members of a National Bridge Federation such as the English Bridge Union or the Deutscher Bridge Verband. The NBFs in turn are members of the zonal EBL, which has 49 member "nations" in 2010. In North America the zonal ACBL is an organization of player members. For world competition, however, the ACBL "members" are the NBFs of Canada, Mexico, and the US, which operate a few tournaments that qualify national representatives to some world events.

The ACBL charters more than 300 Units associated with exclusive territories. They are independent organizations that operate some tournaments and promote bridge locally. ACBL members are considered members of Units determined by residence. North America is also divided into 25 Districts that operate some Regional meets. Players may also be members of clubs that operate some bridge competition sanctioned by the ACBL.

=== Rules ===
The rules for playing duplicate bridge are formally titled The Laws of Duplicate Bridge and are issued by the World Bridge Federation and its member governing bodies. The Laws are designed to define correct procedure and to provide an adequate remedy when there is a departure from correct procedure. They are primarily designed not as punishment for irregularities but rather for the rectification of situations where nonoffenders may otherwise be damaged.

While the majority of primary rules are universal in application, authority to prescribe certain rules, procedures, and requirements of competition and participation are delegated to local governing bodies down to and including the club level.

== See also ==
- Bidding box
- Screen (bridge)
- Board (bridge)
- English Bridge Union
- Duplicate Scrabble - a style of Scrabble inspired by duplicate bridge
- Duplicate poker - The concept of card duplication applied to the popular game of Poker
