= Coup (bridge) =

Special play maneuver in bridge

In contract bridge, coup is a generic name for various techniques in play, denoting a specific pattern in the lie and the play of cards; it is a special play maneuver by declarer.

There are various types of coup which can be effected.

== Pure coups ==
There are many coups which the opponents can do little to prevent.

Bath coup

The original coup was referred to as the Bath Coup, whereby a player holding the Ace, Jack and small card(s) plays small against the lead of a King-Queen sequence, so as to get two tricks (if the suit is continued) or gain tempo.

Belladonna coup

The declarer's act of playing low card below king from Kx-Jxx combination in a suit contract, in order to tangle defender's communications for trumping, ensuring either a trick in the suit or a third-round ruff.

Crocodile coup

The crocodile coup is a technique used by the defense. It is executed by second hand, following suit with a higher card than apparently necessary, to keep fourth hand from winning and thereby being endplayed.

Deschapelles coup

The act of sacrificing a card that would ordinarily be an eventual winner (such as an offside King) to establish an entry into partner's hand.

Devil's coup

The Devil's coup is the act of stopping defenders getting a trump trick from Qx opposite Jxx - surely the work of the Devil?

Coup en passant

The act of ruffing through the player who has bigger trump(s), so that the trump is taken either by ruffing or by making it master trump if the other player ruffs.

Galileo coup

The Galileo coup is so named because Galileo Galilei is usually credited with the invention of the telescope; this coup arises when the contract is in a suit in which the declaring side is missing both the Ace and King; if successful, the defenders end up being forced to play the Ace and King of trumps to the same trick, thus "telescoping" their two trump tricks into one.

Grand coup

A trump coup where the cards ruffed in order to execute a trump reduction are winners.

Merrimac coup

The Merrimac coup is the act of sacrificing an honour (usually a King) in order to remove an entry from an opponent's hand.

Morton's fork coup

The forcing of an opponent to choose between establishing one or more extra tricks in the suit led and losing the opportunity to win a trick in the suit led.

Scissors coup

The Scissors coup is so named because it cuts communications between defenders, most commonly by discarding a key card from either the declarer's own hand or dummy. This enables declarer to prevent the defenders transferring the lead; usually for a defensive ruff.

Trump coup

The Trump coup happens in the end-game when declarer needs to finesse in trumps but doesn't have one to lead up. It is often associated with a Trump Reduction.

Vienna coup

The Vienna coup is the act of cashing an ace opposite the queen (or, more generically, an immediate winner opposite a menace) in order to enable a squeeze to work on either opponent.

== Deceptive coups ==
Some coups rely on the opponents making a mistake.

Grosvenor gambit

The act of deliberately misplaying a hand in order to induce a mistake by an opponent which results in either the same or a superior result. Even when the gambit does not yield a material gain, it usually induces a big psychological impact on the opponents who were offered a trick for free but couldn't have believed it were possible.

Idiot coup

The act of only losing one trick when missing AKx of trumps. Declarer leads through one of the defenders hoping they will play the king from Kx which then falls under their partner's stiff ace. Obviously going up with the king is foolish because if declarer holds the ace, he has a legitimate line whereby he can escape a loser (play the ace and hope for stiff king or take a finesse), hence the name.

An Idiot coup can also refer to a play that appears to present an alternative (losing) option to an opponent, but upon closer inspection could not possibly be the right one. For example, suppose declarer holds ♠xx opposite ♠KT in dummy. During the play of another suit LHO, who is holding ♠AJx, discards the jack, knowing that he is only entitled to one trick in the suit in any case. Now when declarer leads the small card toward dummy and LHO follows low, he might think he has a "guess" in the suit, when in fact LHO would have no reason to discard the jack if he also had the queen. (That is, unless LHO is trying to Grosvenor him.)

== Illegal coups ==
There are also a number of illegal coups:

Alcatraz coup

The Alcatraz coup is performed by purposely revoking when declarer is uncertain which defender to finesse. After the trick is over, declarer knows which defender to finesse, "notices" and corrects his misplay, and finesses the correct defender.

Superglue coup

The Superglue Coup is where a defender pulls out two cards together (as if they were superglued together). Declarer sees the cards and assumes they are adjacent in rank in the defender's hand. For example, if declarer is missing K103 and one defender pulls the K and 3 out together declarer can assume that the defender does not have the 10.
