= Hobson's choice =

Free choice in which only one option is actually offered

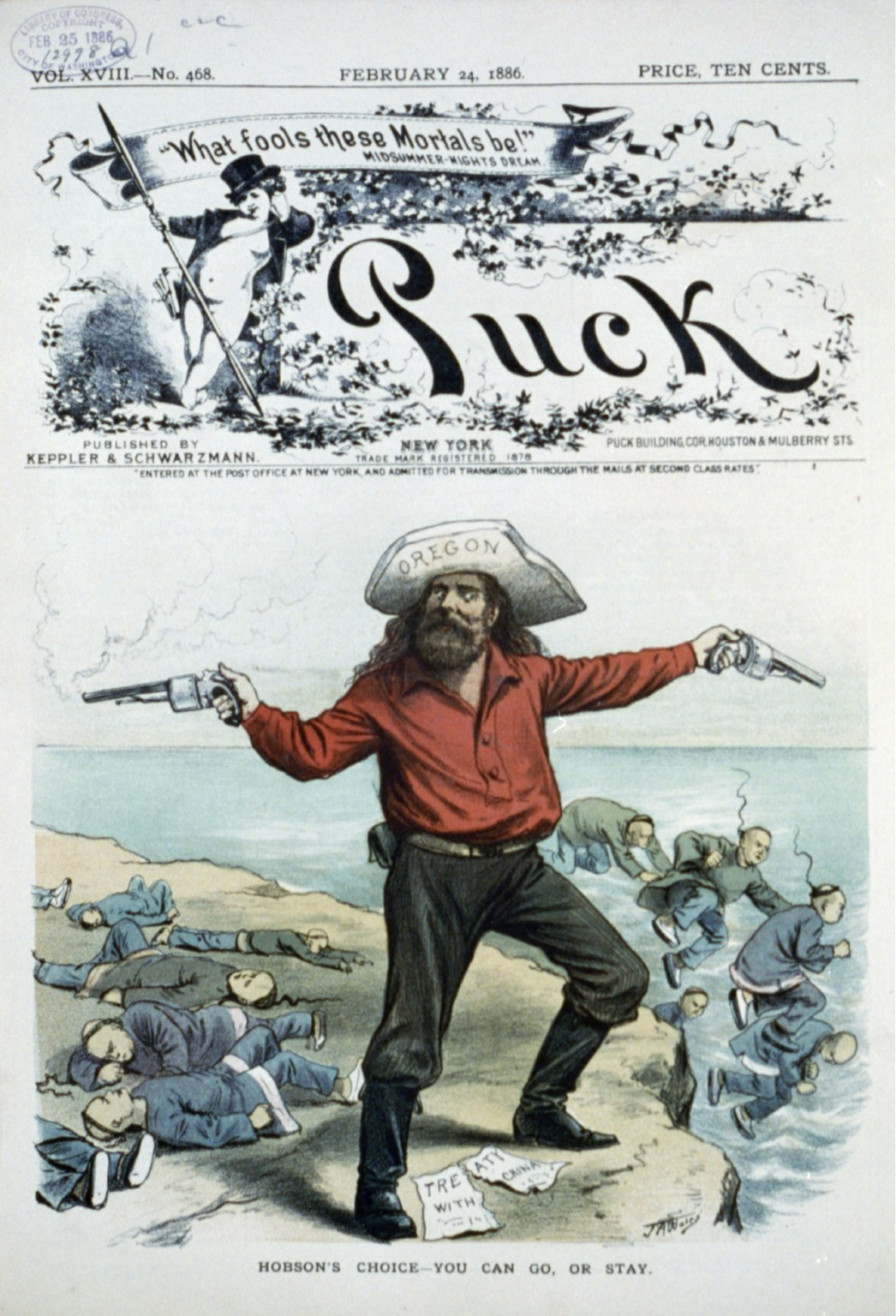
1886 cover of Puck titled "Hobson's choice", by James Albert Wales, showing a gun-wielding personification of Oregon telling Chinese immigrants in the United States: "You can go, or stay."

A Hobson's choice is a free choice in which only one thing is actually offered. The term is often used to describe an illusion that choices are available. The best known example is "I'll give you a choice: take it or leave it", wherein "leaving it" is strongly undesirable.

The phrase is said to have originated with Thomas Hobson (1544–1631), a livery stable owner in Cambridge, England, who offered customers the choice of either taking the horse in the stall nearest to the door or taking none at all.

== Origins ==
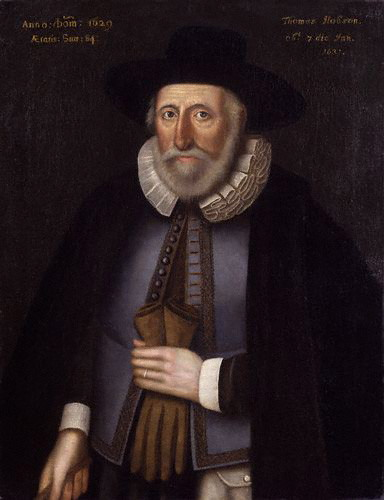
Portrait of Thomas Hobson in the National Portrait Gallery, London

According to a plaque underneath a painting of Hobson donated to Cambridge Guildhall, Hobson had an extensive stable of some 40 horses. This gave the appearance to his customers that, upon entry, they would have their choice of mounts, when in fact there was only one: Hobson required his customers to take the horse in the stall closest to the door. This was to prevent the best horses from always being chosen, which would have meant overuse of the good horses. Hobson's stable was located on land that is now owned by St Catharine's College, Cambridge.

== Early appearances in writing ==
According to the Oxford English Dictionary, the first known written usage of this phrase is in The rustick's alarm to the Rabbies, written by Samuel Fisher in 1660:

If in this Case there be no other (as the Proverb is) then Hobson's choice...which is, choose whether you will have this or none.

— Samuel Fisher, The rustick's alarm to the Rabbies

It also appears in Joseph Addison's paper The Spectator (No. 509 of 14 October 1712); and in Thomas Ward's 1688 poem "England's Reformation", not published until after Ward's death. Ward wrote:

Where to elect there is but one,
'Tis Hobson's choice—take that, or none.

— Thomas Ward, "England's Reformation"

== Modern use ==
The term "Hobson's choice" is often used to mean an illusion of choice, but it is not a choice between two equivalent options, which is a Morton's fork, nor is it a choice between two undesirable options, which is a dilemma. Hobson's choice is one between something and "nothing".

John Stuart Mill, in his book Considerations on Representative Government, refers to Hobson's choice:

When the individuals composing the majority would no longer be reduced to Hobson's choice, of either voting for the person brought forward by their local leaders, or not voting at all.

— John Stuart Mill, Considerations on Representative Government

In another of his books, The Subjection of Women, Mill discusses marriage:

Those who attempt to force women into marriage by closing all other doors against them, lay themselves open to a similar retort. If they mean what they say, their opinion must evidently be, that men do not render the married condition so desirable to women, as to induce them to accept it for its own recommendations. It is not a sign of one's thinking the boon one offers very attractive, when one allows only Hobson's choice, 'that or none'.... And if men are determined that the law of marriage shall be a law of despotism, they are quite right in point of mere policy, in leaving to women only Hobson's choice. But, in that case, all that has been done in the modern world to relax the chain on the minds of women, has been a mistake. They should have never been allowed to receive a literary education.

— John Stuart Mill, The Subjection of Women

== Common law ==
In Immigration and Naturalization Service v. Chadha (1983), Justice Byron White dissented and classified the majority's decision to strike down the "one-house veto" as unconstitutional as leaving Congress with a Hobson's choice. Congress may choose between "refrain[ing] from delegating the necessary authority, leaving itself with a hopeless task of writing laws with the requisite specificity to cover endless special circumstances across the entire policy landscape, or in the alternative, to abdicate its law-making function to the executive branch and independent agency".

In Philadelphia v. New Jersey, 437 U.S. 617 (1978), the majority opinion ruled that a New Jersey law prohibiting the importation of solid or liquid waste from other states into New Jersey was unconstitutional based on the Commerce Clause. The majority reasoned that New Jersey cannot discriminate between the intrastate waste and the interstate waste without due justification. In dissent, Justice Rehnquist stated:

[According to the Court,] New Jersey must either prohibit all landfill operations, leaving itself to cast about for a presently non-existent solution to the serious problem of disposing of the waste generated within its own borders, or it must accept waste from every portion of the United States, thereby multiplying the health and safety problems which would result if it dealt only with such wastes generated within the State. Because past precedents establish that the Commerce Clause does not present appellees with such a Hobson's choice, I dissent.

— William Rehnquist

In Monell v. Department of Social Services of the City of New York, 436 U.S. 658 (1978), the judgment of the court was that

[T]here was ample support for Blair's view that the Sherman Amendment, by putting municipalities to the Hobson's choice of keeping the peace or paying civil damages, attempted to impose obligations to municipalities by indirection that could not be imposed directly, thereby threatening to "destroy the government of the states".

— Monell v. Department of Social Services of the City of New York

In the South African Constitutional Case MEC for Education, Kwa-Zulu Natal and Others v Pillay, 2008 (1) SA 474 (CC), Chief Justice Langa for the majority of the Court writes that:

The traditional basis for invalidating laws that prohibit the exercise of an obligatory religious practice is that it confronts the adherents with a Hobson's choice between observance of their faith and adherence to the law. There is however more to the protection of religious and cultural practices than saving believers from hard choices. As stated above, religious and cultural practices are protected because they are central to human identity and hence to human dignity which is in turn central to equality. Are voluntary practices any less a part of a person's identity or do they affect human dignity any less seriously because they are not mandatory?

— Pius Langa, MEC for Education, Kwa-Zulu Natal and Others v Pillay, 2008 (1) SA 474 (CC), Paragraph 62

In Epic Systems Corp. v. Lewis (2018), Justice Ruth Bader Ginsburg dissented and added in one of the footnotes that the petitioners "faced a Hobson’s choice: accept arbitration on their employer’s terms or give up their jobs".

In Trump et al v. Mazars USA, LLP, US Court of Appeals for the District of Columbia No. 19-5142, 49 (D.C. Cir. 11 October 2019) ("[w]orse still, the dissent’s novel approach would now impose upon the courts the job of ordering the cessation of the legislative function and putting Congress to the Hobson’s Choice of impeachment or nothing.").

In Meriwether v. Hartop, the court addressed the university's offer, "Don’t use any pronouns or sex-based terms at all". It wrote, "The effect of this Hobson’s Choice is that Meriwether must adhere to the university’s orthodoxy (or face punishment). This is coercion, at the very least of the indirect sort".

== In popular culture ==
Possibly the most famous use of the expression in popular culture is as the title of Harold Brighouse's 1915 play of the same name, and its several screen adaptations. Of these, the most notable is David Lean's 1954 film, starring Charles Laughton, John Mills and Brenda de Banzie.

== Different from ==
A Hobson's choice is different from:

- Dilemma: A choice between two or more options, none of which is attractive.
- False dilemma: Only certain choices are considered, when in fact there are others.
- Catch 22: A logical paradox arising from a situation in which an individual needs something that can only be acquired by not being in that very situation.
- Morton's fork, and a double-bind: Choices yield equivalent and, often, undesirable results.
- Blackmail and extortion: The choice between paying money (or some non-monetary good or deed) or risk suffering an unpleasant action.
- Illusion of control or illusion of choice: False belief in an ability to control events (to choose the outcome)

A common error is to use the phrase "Hobbesian choice" instead of "Hobson's choice", confusing the philosopher Thomas Hobbes with the relatively obscure Thomas Hobson (it is possible the confusion is between "Hobson's choice" and a "Hobbesian trap", which refers to the situation in which a state attacks another out of fear).

== See also ==
- Buckley's chance
- Buridan's ass
- Boulwarism
- Choice architecture
- Locus of control
- Morton's fork
- Motonormativity - the concept of Hobson's choice applied to transportation
- No-win situation
- Sophie's choice
- Standard form contract
- Ultimatum
- Zugzwang
