= Vacant Places =

Estimation method used in the card game bridge

In the card game bridge, the law or principle of vacant places is a simple method for estimating the probable location of any particular card in the two unseen hands. It can be used both to aid in a decision at the table and to derive the entire suit division probability table.

At the beginning of a deal, each of four hands comprises thirteen cards and one may say there are thirteen vacant places in each hand. The probability that a particular card lies in a particular hand is one-quarter, or 13/52, the proportion of vacant places in that hand. From the perspective of a player who sees one hand, the probable lie of a missing card in a particular one of the other hands is one-third. In Contract bridge, once the play commences, the dummy is exposed and so, for any player, there are only two unseen hands where a card may lie.

The principle of vacant places is a rule for updating those uniform probabilities as one learns about the deal during the auction and the play. Essentially, as the lie of some cards becomes known – especially as the entire distributions of some suits become known – the odds on location of any other particular card remain proportional to the dwindling numbers of unidentified cards in all hands, i.e. to the numbers of so-called vacant places.

The principle of vacant places follows from conditional probability theory, which is based on Bayes' theorem. For a good background to bridge probabilities, and vacant places in particular, see Kelsey; see also the Official Encyclopedia of Bridge.

== How Vacant Places calculations work at the table ==
♥ K 9 6 2

♥ A J 8 7 3

We are the declarer in a heart contract with trump suit combination Kxxx in dummy and AJxxx in hand (see figure). There are four heart cards missing, the queen and three spot cards or ♥Qxxx. We play small to the king as both opponents follow low and lead another small heart, ♥2. The last of the three spot cards appears on our right leaving one outstanding heart, the queen. Because no one would play the queen while holding a spot card too, we have learned nothing about the location of the queen directly, only the distribution of the three spot cards, one at left and two at right. At the moment of decision we can perform a vacant places calculation.

First, suppose we know nothing about the other suits, probably because the opponents did not bid. Then we know only the one small heart observed at left and the two observed at right. That leaves twelve "vacant places" where ♥Q may reside at left and eleven vacant places at right. If the queen lies in 12 of the 23 vacant places, at left, we win by playing the ace; the queen drops. In 11 of the 23 vacant places, we win by playing the jack and then the ace, dropping the queen at right on the next heart trick. Thus the odds in favor of playing the ace are 12 to 11; the ace is a slight favorite to win an extra trick, i.e. to win five tricks in hearts. The proportion 12/23 = 52.174% is exactly the probability that appears in standard catalogs of suit combinations.

Note, however, that this calculation is only available in the heart suit because we have accounted for all the other hearts, that is to say every heart but the one we are still seeking. If we were missing a total of five heart cards, then a vacant places calculation could not be applied.

♥ K 9 6 2
♠ x x x

♥ A J 8 7 3
♠ x x

Alternatively, suppose that LHO dealt and opened 2♠ (weak); we reached a heart contract without further bidding by the opponents; and we have five spades between dummy and hand leaving eight for the opponents. We may infer that LHO has six spades and RHO two. (This is not certain; occasionally the spades lie seven and one or five and three. If six and two, that leaves seven and eleven vacant places for the other three suits.) The heart suit combination and play are as discussed above: the combination in the figure; we lead small to the king while both opponents follow low, and lead ♥2 back toward hand while RHO follows low. Now there are six vacant places for ♥Q at left and nine vacant places at right. The odds are now 6 to 9 against the queen at left, and against winning if we play the ace. The proportion 9/15 = 60% is the probability that RHO holds the queen and playing the jack will win the suit.

== How Vacant Places calculations work away from the table ==
Let us imagine that we are required to build up a set of probability tables to help show how a suit might be splitting, for example, the Probability of suit distributions in two hidden hands on the page Bridge probabilities. Let's suppose that we are missing three cards in the suit and we know nothing about the distribution of other suits (i.e. we are looking for the a priori probabilities). When we "deal" out the first card of the three, we can put it in either hand. Each hand, by definition, has 13 vacant places, so it is a toss-up which hand it goes into (13/26 = 50% for either hand). Now let us suppose that we want to know the probability of the suit being divided 3–0. The first card is already in, let us say, the East hand. Now he has only 12 vacant places so the probability of that hand getting the second of the three cards is 12/(12 + 13). This must be multiplied by the initial 1/2 probability to find the probability of East having both of the first two cards. Now let's deal out the third (and last) of the missing cards. By this time, East has only 11 vacant places, while West still has 13. The probability of East getting all three of the missing cards is 1/2 × 12/25 × 11/24 which is exactly 0.11, which is the value that we see in the fourth row of the table (3 - 0 : 0.22 : 2 : 0.11).

Now, let's calculate the individual probability of a 2–2 split when missing four cards (the following row in the table). This time, proceeding similarly to before, the calculation is:

13/26 × 12/25 × 13/24 × 12/23 = (3 × 13) / (23 × 25) = 0.067826.  

This amount has to be multiplied by 6, exactly the ways the 2–2 distribution can show up, the combination of getting 2 cards over 4. The final probability of a 2–2 split is then 0.067826 * 6 = 0.4069565217

The probabilities of other suit divisions can be calculated similarly.

== See also ==
- Bridge probabilities
- Percentage play
- Principle of restricted choice
- Safety play
- Suit combination
