= False dilemma =

Informal fallacy involving falsely limited alternatives

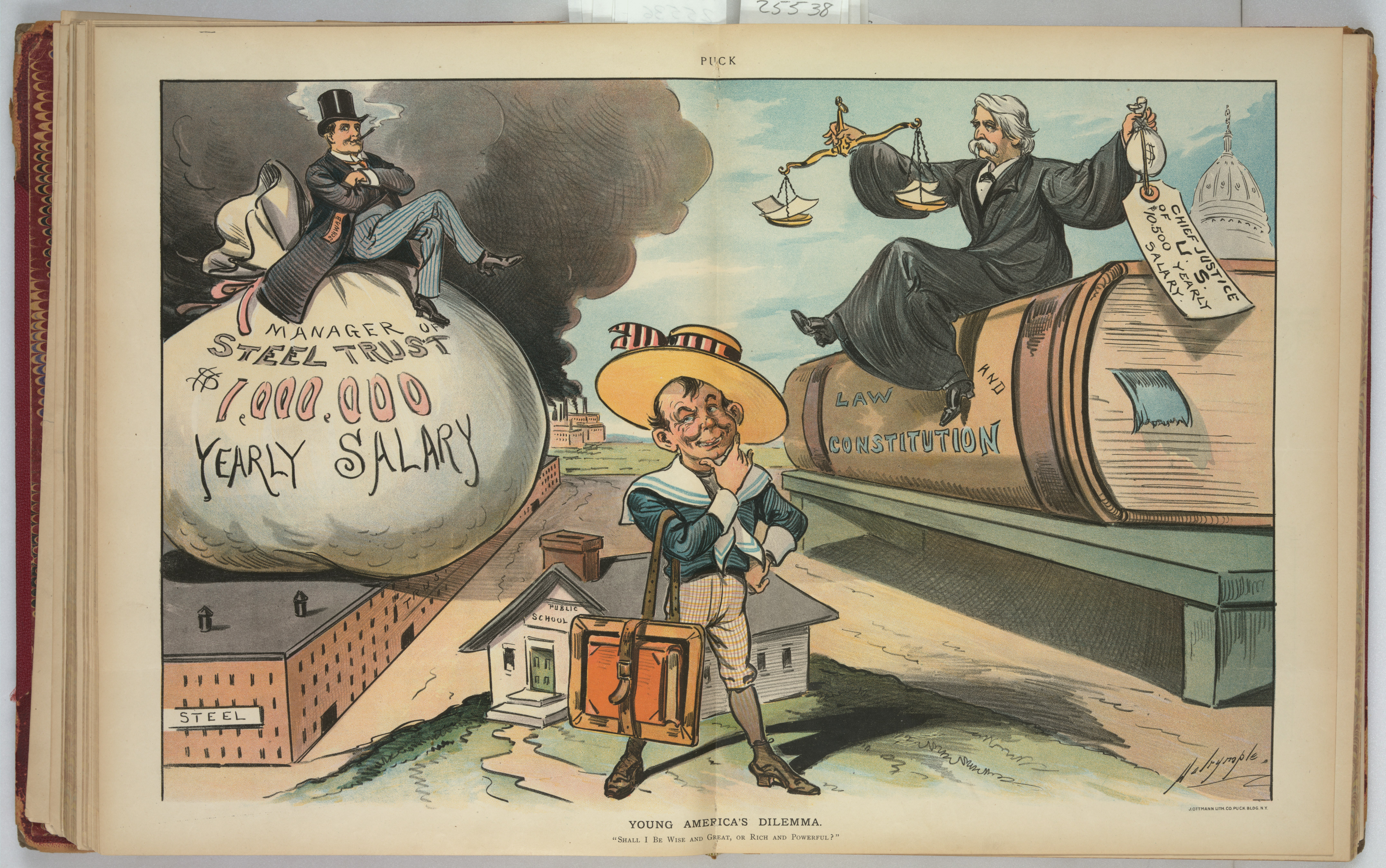
Young America's dilemma: "Shall I be wise and great, or rich and powerful?" (Puck 1901)

A false dilemma, also referred to as false dichotomy or false binary, is an informal fallacy based on a premise that erroneously limits what options are available. The source of the fallacy lies not in an invalid form of inference but in a false premise. This premise has the form of a disjunctive claim: it asserts that one among a number of alternatives must be true. This disjunction is problematic because it oversimplifies the choice by excluding viable alternatives, presenting the interlocutor with only two absolute choices when in fact there could be many.

False dilemmas often have the form of treating two contraries, which may both be false, as contradictories, of which one is necessarily true. Various inferential schemes are associated with false dilemmas, for example, the constructive dilemma, the destructive dilemma or the disjunctive syllogism. False dilemmas are usually discussed in terms of deductive arguments, but they can also occur as defeasible arguments.

The human liability to commit false dilemmas may be due to the tendency to simplify reality by ordering it through either-or-statements, which is to some extent already built into human language. This may also be connected to the tendency to insist on clear distinction while denying the vagueness of many common expressions.

== Definition ==
A false dilemma is an informal fallacy based on a premise that erroneously limits what options are available. In its simplest form, called the fallacy of bifurcation, all but two alternatives are excluded. A fallacy is an argument, i.e. a series of premises together with a conclusion, that is unsound, i.e. not both valid and true. Fallacies are usually divided into formal and informal fallacies. Formal fallacies are unsound because of their structure, while informal fallacies are unsound because of their content. The problematic content in the case of the false dilemma has the form of a disjunctive claim: it asserts that one among a number of alternatives must be true. This disjunction is problematic because it oversimplifies the choice by excluding viable alternatives. Sometimes a distinction is made between a false dilemma and a false dichotomy. On this view, the term "false dichotomy" refers to the false disjunctive claim while the term "false dilemma" refers not just to this claim but to the argument based on this claim.

== Types ==
=== Disjunction with contraries ===
In its most common form, a false dilemma presents the alternatives as contradictories, while in truth they are merely contraries. Two propositions are contradictories if it has to be the case that one is true and the other is false. Two propositions are contraries if at most one of them can be true, but leaves open the option that both of them might be false, which is not possible in the case of contradictories. Contradictories follow the law of the excluded middle but contraries do not. For example, the sentence "the exact number of marbles in the urn is either 10 or not 10" presents two contradictory alternatives. The sentence "the exact number of marbles in the urn could be either 10 or 11" presents two contrary alternatives: the urn could also contain 2 marbles or 17 marbles. A common form of using contraries in false dilemmas is to force a choice between extremes on the agent: someone is either good or bad, rich or poor, normal or abnormal. Such cases ignore that there is a continuous spectrum between the extremes that is excluded from the choice. While false dilemmas involving contraries, i.e. exclusive options, are a very common form, this is just a special case: there are also arguments with non-exclusive disjunctions that are false dilemmas. For example, a choice between security and freedom does not involve contraries since these two terms are compatible with each other.

=== Logical forms ===
In logic, there are two main types of inferences known as dilemmas: the constructive dilemma and the destructive dilemma. In their most simple form, they can be expressed in the following way:

- simple constructive: $\frac{(P \to Q), (R \to Q), (P \lor R)}{\therefore Q}$
- simple destructive: $\frac{(P \to Q), (P \to R), (\lnot Q \lor \lnot R)}{\therefore \lnot P}$

The source of the fallacy is found in the disjunctive claim in the third premise, i.e. $P \lor R$ and $\lnot Q \lor \lnot R$ respectively. The following is an example of a false dilemma with the simple constructive form: (1) "If you tell the truth, you force your friend into a social tragedy; and therefore, are an immoral person". (2) "If you lie, you are an immoral person (since it is immoral to lie)". (3) "Either you tell the truth, or you lie". Therefore "[y]ou are an immoral person (whatever choice you make in the given situation)". This example constitutes a false dilemma because there are other choices besides telling the truth and lying, like keeping silent. A false dilemma can also occur in the form of a disjunctive syllogism:

- disjunctive syllogism: $\frac{(P \lor Q), (\lnot P)}{\therefore Q}$

In this form, the first premise ($P \lor Q$) is responsible for the fallacious inference. Lewis's trilemma is a famous example of this type of argument involving three disjuncts: "Jesus was either a liar, a lunatic, or Lord". By denying that Jesus was a liar or a lunatic, one is forced to draw the conclusion that he was God. But this leaves out various other alternatives, for example, that Jesus was a prophet.

=== Deductive and defeasible arguments ===
False dilemmas are usually discussed in terms of deductive arguments. But they can also occur as defeasible arguments. A valid argument is deductive if the truth of its premises ensures the truth of its conclusion. For a valid defeasible argument, on the other hand, it is possible for all its premises to be true and the conclusion to be false. The premises merely offer a certain degree of support for the conclusion but do not ensure it. In the case of a defeasible false dilemma, the support provided for the conclusion is overestimated since various alternatives are not considered in the disjunctive premise.

== Explanation and avoidance ==
Part of understanding fallacies involves going beyond logic to empirical psychology in order to explain why there is a tendency to commit or fall for the fallacy in question. In the case of the false dilemma, the tendency to simplify reality by ordering it through either-or-statements may play an important role. This tendency is to some extent built into human language, which is full of pairs of opposites. This type of simplification is sometimes necessary to make decisions when there is not enough time to get a more detailed perspective. In order to avoid false dilemmas, the agent should become aware of additional options besides the prearranged alternatives. Critical thinking and creativity may be necessary to see through the false dichotomy and to discover new alternatives.

== Relation to distinctions and vagueness ==
Some philosophers and scholars believe that "unless a distinction can be made rigorous and precise it isn't really a distinction". An exception is John Searle, an analytic philosopher who called it an incorrect assumption that produces false dichotomies. Searle insists that "it is a condition of the adequacy of a precise theory of an indeterminate phenomenon that it should precisely characterize that phenomenon as indeterminate; and a distinction is no less a distinction for allowing for a family of related, marginal, diverging cases."

Similarly, when two options are presented, they often are, although not always, two extreme points on some spectrum of possibilities; this may lend credence to the larger argument by giving the impression that the options are mutually exclusive, even though they need not be. Furthermore, the options in false dichotomies typically are presented as being collectively exhaustive, in which case the fallacy may be overcome, or at least weakened, by considering other possibilities, or perhaps by considering a whole spectrum of possibilities, as in fuzzy logic. This issue arises from real dichotomies in nature, the most prevalent example is the occurrence of an event. It either happened or it did not happen. This ontology sets a logical construct that cannot be reasonably applied to epistemology.

== Examples ==
=== False choice ===
The presentation of a false choice often reflects a deliberate attempt to eliminate several options that may occupy the middle ground on an issue. A common argument against noise pollution laws involves a false choice. It might be argued that in New York City noise should not be regulated, because if it were, a number of businesses would be required to close. This argument assumes that, for example, a bar must be shut down to prevent disturbing levels of noise emanating from it after midnight. This ignores the fact that law could require the bar to lower its noise levels, or install soundproofing structural elements to keep the noise from excessively transmitting onto others' properties.

=== Black-and-white thinking ===
In psychology, a phenomenon related to the false dilemma is "black-and-white thinking" or "thinking in black and white". There are people who routinely engage in black-and-white thinking, an example of which is someone who categorizes other people as all good or all bad.

== Similar concepts ==
Various different terms are used to refer to false dilemmas. Some of the following terms are equivalent to the term false dilemma, some refer to special forms of false dilemmas and others refer to closely related concepts.

- Bifurcation fallacy
- Black-or-white fallacy
- Denying a conjunct (similar to a false dichotomy)
- Double bind
- Either/or fallacy
- Fallacy of exhaustive hypotheses
- Fallacy of the excluded middle
- Fallacy of the false alternative
- False binary
- False choice
- False dichotomy
- Invalid disjunction
- No middle ground

== See also ==
- Argument to moderation
- Bivalence
- Choice architecture
- Degrees of truth
- Dichotomy
- Distinction without a difference
- Euthyphro dilemma
- Fallacy of the single cause
- Half-truth
- Hobson's choice
- Law of excluded middle
- Lewis' trilemma
- Loaded question
- Love–hate relationship
- Many-valued logic
- Morton's fork
- Mutually exclusive
- Nolan Chart
- Nondualism
- None of the above
- Obscurantism
- Pascal's Wager
- Perspectivism
- Political systems
  - One-party system
  - Two-party system
- Rogerian argument
- Show election
- Slippery slope
- Sorites paradox
- Splitting (psychology)
- Strange loop § In cognitive science
- Straw man
- Thinking outside the box
- Unreasonable
- You're either with us, or against us
- Zero-sum thinking
