= Tempo (bridge) =

Timing advantage in the card game of bridge

In the card game of bridge, tempo is the timing advantage of being on lead, thus being first to initiate one's play strategy to develop tricks for one's side. Tempo also refers to the speed of play and more generally the rhythm of play over several tricks.

According to the rules of the game, the right to select the first card to play (the opening lead) belongs to the defenders; afterwards, the right to lead belongs to the hand who has won the previous trick. Being on lead generally presents an advantage, as it presents an opportunity to choose a suit and card which will develop a trick for the leader's side. However, in endplay situations being on lead certainly does not present an advantage—quite the opposite.

The tempo can be used for many purposes:

- Setting up tricks – for example, against notrump contracts, defenders will often lead the longest and strongest suit, to set up the tricks in that suit. Against trump contracts, lead of a short suit can set up a subsequent ruff before the declarer can draw trumps.
- Pitching losers – for example, having x opposite AKQx, the declarer may discard cards from another suit on the honors, holding xxx opposite xxx if on lead; if the opponents were on lead, they can cash the tricks in the declarer's weak suit.
- Taking tricks – the converse of pitching losers. Having the lead lets us take our tricks before the other side gets to pitch in the suit(s).
- Trump promotion or coup en passant – if the other side had the lead, they could simply draw trumps; however, with our side on lead, an extra trump trick can be produced.
- Killing entries – opponents can be forced to use entries in the wrong order.

== Examples ==
| Example 1 | | ♠♤ | A K Q J | | |
| Example 1 | | ♥ | x | | |
| Example 1 | | ♦ | x x x x | | |
| Example 1 | | ♣♧ | x x x x | | |
| ♠♤ | x x x x | N W E S | | ♠♤ | x x x x |
| ♥ | x x x x | N W E S | | ♥ | x x x x |
| ♦ | A K Q J | N W E S | | ♦ | x |
| ♣♧ | x | N W E S | | ♣♧ | A K Q J |
| | | ♠♤ | x | | |
| | | ♥ | A K Q J | | |
| | | ♦ | x x x x | | |
| | | ♣♧ | x x x x | | |

In this extreme example, whoever leads first will take the first 8 tricks, regardless of the denomination. That means that neither side can make any contract, and every contract will fail by at least two tricks—the advantage of having on opening lead makes a three-trick difference.

| Example 2 South in 4♠ | | ♠♤ | J 10 7 5 4 2 | | |
| Example 2 South in 4♠ | | ♥ | J | | |
| Example 2 South in 4♠ | | ♦ | A Q 3 | | |
| Example 2 South in 4♠ | | ♣♧ | J 7 6 | | |
| ♠♤ | K 6 | N W E S | | ♠♤ | 9 |
| ♥ | A K 8 4 | N W E S | | ♥ | 7 6 5 3 |
| ♦ | 8 5 2 | N W E S | | ♦ | K J 10 4 |
| ♣♧ | K 7 5 4 | N W E S | | ♣♧ | 10 8 3 2 |
| Lead: ♥A | | ♠♤ | A Q 8 3 | | |
| Lead: ♥A | | ♥ | Q 10 9 2 | | |
| Lead: ♥A | | ♦ | 9 7 6 | | |
| Lead: ♥A | | ♣♧ | A Q | | |

Keeping initiative—gaining tempo—by not taking a finesse can be decisive to prevent the opponents from developing defensive tricks.

Against South's 4♠ west leads the ♥A (indicating the king) and continues with the ♦8. The opening lead, although natural, was unfortunate, as it gave the declarer a tempo to develop heart tricks for himself. However, it is now essential not to take the diamond finesse so as not to lose tempo. South must take the ♦A and play to the ♠A, again refraining from finessing. Now, the declarer can lead hearts for ruffing finesse and discard diamonds until West covers with the ♥K, then ruff and cross over to ♣A, again refusing to finesse. On the remaining hearts, all diamonds including the queen are discarded. In total, the declarer loses one trick in trumps, hearts and clubs each.

Note that a diamond opening lead sets the contract, as it doesn't give the tempo in hearts to the declarer: the declarer must lose a heart and two diamonds before he sets up the hearts for diamond discards; the trump king is the fourth trick for the defense.

== Ethics ==
It is important that the defenders establish a rhythmic tempo to their play. For example, if declarer is attempting to locate a particular card, such as an adversely held ace or queen, he may conclude which opponent is most likely to have it based upon a hesitation by that opponent. While the declarer may take advantage of such a hesitation at his own risk, an opponent who deliberately hesitates before making a play with intent to deceive the declarer is guilty of unethical conduct under the proprieties of the game and is subject to penalty.
