= Smother play =

Type of endplay in bridge

Smother play in contract bridge is a type of endplay where an opponent's apparent trump trick goes away.

== Example ==
The situation can be illustrated with the following end-position:

		♠♤	A		
		♥	4		
		♦	4		
		♣♧	—		
♠♤	K 6	N W E S		♠♤	—
♥	J	N W E S		♥	—
♦	—	N W E S		♦	10 9 8
♣♧	—	N W E S		♣♧	—
North to lead		♠♤	Q J		
North to lead		♥	10		
North to lead		♦	—		
North to lead		♣♧	—		

Spades are trumps, and the lead is in the North (dummy) hand, declarer needing 2 tricks. It appears that the declarer is fated to take just one more trick with the Ace of spades. However, if the declarer leads dummy's diamond, pitching a heart (loser on loser play) (as does West), East gains the trick and has to lead something at trick 12. Whichever card he leads, South will play his trump and West's king is "smothered" – whatever spade he plays, South will take the last two tricks.

Smother play can be executed only when the victim's partner is on lead, because it requires that the declarer ruffs in one hand, and decides whether to overruff with the other.

== See also ==
- Devil's coup
- Trump coup
