= Dilemma =

Problem requiring a choice between equally undesirable alternatives

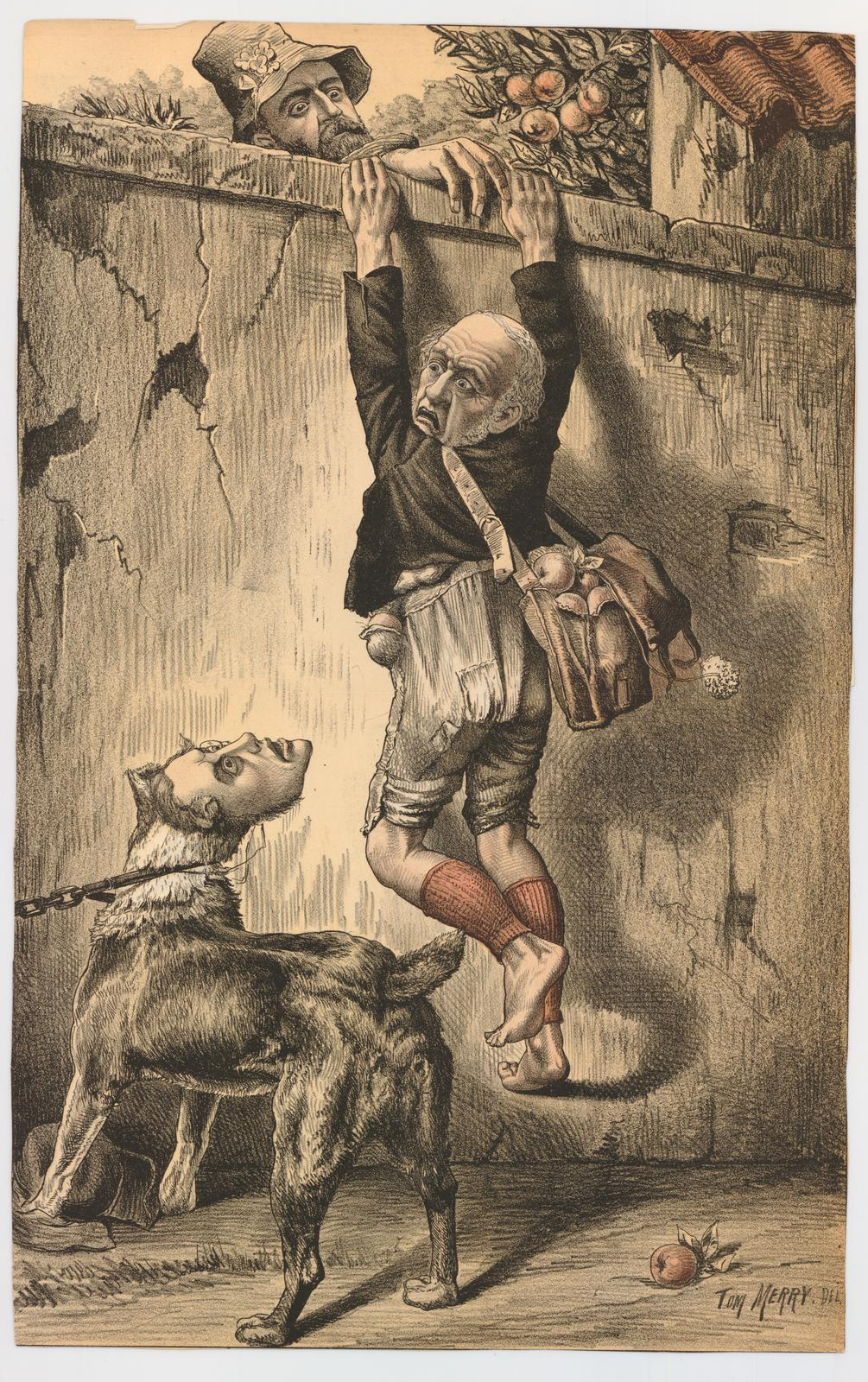
Cartoon showing William Ewart Gladstone in a dilemma: If he climbs to escape the guard dog he will face the man's wrath, but if he drops to avoid the man, the dog will attack him.

A dilemma (from Ancient Greek δίλημμα (dílēmma) 'double proposition') is a problem offering two possibilities, neither of which is unambiguously acceptable or preferable. The possibilities are termed the horns of the dilemma, a clichéd usage, but distinguishing the dilemma from other kinds of predicament as a matter of usage.

== Terminology ==
The term dilemma is attributed by Gabriel Nuchelmans to Lorenzo Valla in the 15th century, in later versions of his logic text traditionally called Dialectica. Valla claimed that it was the appropriate Latin equivalent of the Greek dilemmaton. Nuchelmans argued that his probable source was a logic text of c. 1433 of George of Trebizond. He also concluded that Valla had reintroduced to the Latin West a type of argument that had fallen into disuse.

Valla's neologism did not immediately take hold, preference being given to the established Latin term complexio, used by Cicero, with conversio applied to the upsetting of dilemmatic reasoning. With the support of Juan Luis Vives, however, dilemma was widely applied by the end of the 16th century.

A dilemma is often phrased as "you must accept either A, or B", where A and B are propositions, each leading to some subsequent conclusion. In the case where this is true, it can be called a "dichotomy", but when it is not true, the dilemma constitutes a false dichotomy, which is a logical fallacy. Traditional usage distinguished the dilemma as a "horned syllogism" from the sophism that attracted the Latin name cornutus. The original use of the word horns in English has been attributed to Nicholas Udall in his 1548 book Paraphrases, translating from the Latin term cornuta interrogatio.

== Dilemmatic arguments ==
The dilemma is sometimes used as a rhetorical device. Its isolation as textbook material has been attributed to Hermogenes of Tarsus in his work On Invention. C. S. Peirce gave a definition of dilemmatic argument as any argument relying on excluded middle.

=== In logic ===
In propositional logic, dilemma is applied to a group of rules of inference, which are in themselves valid rather than fallacious. They each have three premises, and include the constructive dilemma and destructive dilemma. Such arguments can be refuted by showing that the disjunctive premise—the "horns of the dilemma"—does not, in fact, hold, because it presents a false dichotomy. One is asked to accept "A or B", but counters by showing that that is not all. Successfully undermining that premise is called "escaping through the horns of the dilemma".

=== In philosophy ===
Dilemmatic reasoning has been attributed to Melissus of Samos, a Presocratic philosopher whose works survive in fragmentary form, making the origins of the technique in philosophy imponderable. It was established with Diodorus Cronus (died c. 284 BCE). The paradoxes of Zeno of Elea were reported by Aristotle in dilemma form, but that may have been to conform with what Plato said about Zeno's style.

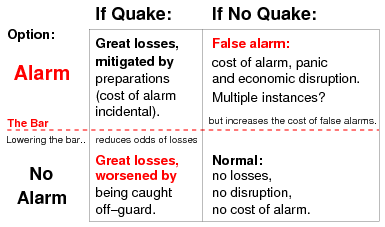
Contingency table of sounding (or not sounding) an alarm for a possible earthquake

=== Moral dilemmas along with ethical dilemmas ===
In cases where two moral principles appear to be inconsistent, an actor confronts a dilemma in terms of which principle to follow. This kind of moral case study is attributed to Cicero, in book III of his De Officiis. In the Christian tradition of casuistry, an approach to abstract ranking of principles introduced by Bartolomé de Medina in the 16th century became tainted with the accusation of laxism, as did casuistry itself. Another approach, with legal roots, is to lay emphasis on particular features present in a given case: in other words, the exact framing of the dilemma.

=== In law ===
In law, Valentin Jeutner has argued that the term "legal dilemma" could be used as a term-of-art, to describe a situation where a legal subject is confronted with two or more legal norms that the legal subject cannot simultaneously comply with.

Examples include contradictory contracts where one clause directly negates another clause, or conflicts between fundamental (e.g. constitutional) legal norms. Leibniz's 1666 doctoral dissertation De casibus perplexis (Perplexing Cases) is an early study of contradictory legal conditions. In domestic law, it has been argued that the German Constitutional Court confronted a legal dilemma when determining, in connection with proceedings relating to the German Aviation Security Act, whether a government official could intentionally kill innocent civilians by shooting down a hijacked airplane that would otherwise have crashed into a football stadium, killing tens of thousands.

In international law, it has been suggested that the International Court of Justice confronted a legal dilemma in its 1996 Nuclear Weapons Advisory Opinion. It was faced with the question whether, in an extreme circumstance of self-defence, it is a state's right to self-defence or international law's general prohibition of nuclear weapons that should take priority.

== See also ==
- Trilemma – Difficult choice from three options
- At Dulcarnon – English phrase – at the end of one's wits
