= Bath coup =

Play in bridge and whist

The Bath coup is a coup in the game of contract bridge in which the declarer, who holds AJx(x) in a suit, ducks the left-hand opponent's lead of a king (or a queen) in that suit. The coup is presumed to be named after the city of Bath in England and dates from the game of whist, the predecessor of bridge.

The purpose of the Bath coup is either to gain a trick by means of a free finesse if the suit is continued or to gain a tempo because the suit may not be continued by opponents without the loss of a trick. The basic position for the Bath coup is like this diagram:

	5 4 3	
K Q 10 9 8	W N↑ S↓ E	7 6
	A J 2	

West leads the king at a notrump contract. If South takes the trick immediately, his jack can be finessed subsequently if East gains a later trick, providing four tricks in the suit for the defense. However, if South applies the Bath coup by ducking, he will either take two tricks with AJ, or the opponents would have to regain the lead twice to cash the suit—first, East must gain the lead in order to finesse through declarer's AJ, and later, West must regain the lead to cash the suit. If the suit is divided 5–2, as in the diagram, the declarer has in effect performed a hold up with an additional gain in tempo, as the opponents have to regain the lead once each. If the suit were divided 4–3, the last lead could be gained by any opponent to cash the suit, but the number of available tricks would be smaller.

	A 4 3	
K Q 10 9 8	W N↑ S↓ E	7 6
	J 5 2	

The coup also occurs when ace and jack are split, but the jack lies before KQ.

== Defense ==
The defense can relatively easily prevent giving away the trick by free finesse by accurate signaling. The most common signaling method on partner's lead is encouraging/discouraging (high card/low card respectively). In the examples above, East would play the six (the lowest), indicating that he doesn't have the jack. However, there are situations when West may misread the signal. To overcome the situation, some players agree that throwing away the jack is mandatory when a King is led at a notrump contract; yet others play that only the lead of the queen requires the partner to drop the Jack if he has it.

However, when a Bath coup position arises, defenders can't regain the tempo. What they can do, though, is to utilize the order of their entries correctly, as in the following deal:

South in 3NT		♠♤	5 4 3		
South in 3NT		♥	6 5		
South in 3NT		♦	K Q 3		
South in 3NT		♣♧	K Q J 10 8		
♠♤	K Q 10 9 8	N W E S		♠♤	7 6
♥	A 4 3	N W E S		♥	8 7 2
♦	10 7 6	N W E S		♦	J 9 5 2
♣♧	6 2	N W E S		♣♧	A 7 4 3
Lead ♠K		♠♤	A J 2		
Lead ♠K		♥	K Q J 10 9		
Lead ♠K		♦	A 8 4		
Lead ♠K		♣♧	9 5		

West leads ♠K against 3NT, South executes the Bath coup by ducking, and West must switch. If he plays a red suit, declarer will play on hearts (and will have to guess the position correctly). When West takes his ace, he still cannot continue spades, and the declarer will have time to develop a club trick as his ninth (along with four heart tricks, ♠A, and three diamonds). However, if West plays a club, the declarer is doomed: East will take his ♣A and play a spade through, while West still has the ♥A as an entry to good spades.
