= Scissors coup =

Type of coup in bridge

Scissors coup (or, scissor coup, also at one time called "the coup without a name") is a type of coup in bridge, so named because it cuts communications between defenders. By discarding a card or cards either from declarer's hand or from dummy or both, declarer can stop them from transferring the lead between each other, usually to prevent a defensive ruff.

South in 5♦		♠♤	K 9 7 5		
South in 5♦		♥	3 2		
South in 5♦		♦	7 6		
South in 5♦		♣♧	K 10 7 4 3		
♠♤	10 8 3	N W E S		♠♤	6 4 2
♥	8 4	N W E S		♥	A Q 10 9 7 6 5
♦	A J	N W E S		♦	2
♣♧	A J 9 6 5 2	N W E S		♣♧	Q 8
Lead:♥8		♠♤	A Q J		
Lead:♥8		♥	K J		
Lead:♥8		♦	K Q 10 9 8 5 4 3		
Lead:♥8		♣♧	-		

Consider this hand and auction with an opening lead of the eight of hearts.

West	North	East	South
		3♥	5♦
Pass	Pass	Pass	

Superficially, it looks as if there are only two losers: a heart and a diamond. However, if East plays the queen, South (declarer) must win with the king, or else his contract will be quickly defeated. The danger is then that West will win the first diamond (trump) lead, and play his other heart which his partner, East, wins with the ace. Then if East plays a third round of hearts they can benefit from a trump promotion - South must trump high, or West's jack will win. This promotes West's jack to the highest outstanding trump, guaranteeing a third defensive trick.

The solution is as follows: upon winning the king of hearts declarer must cross to the king of spades and lead the king of clubs and throwing away the jack of hearts. By this Scissors Coup, East can no longer gain the lead.

== See also ==
- Loser on loser
