= Uppercut (bridge) =

Defensive play in contract bridge

In contract bridge, an uppercut is a defensive play that involves one of the defenders ruffing high in the knowledge that an overruff by the declarer will result in the promotion of a trump card in their partner's hand into a winner. Thus, the technique presents a type of trump promotion.

It is best illustrated with an example:

Spades are trumps		♠♤	10 9 7 5		
Spades are trumps		♥	A		
Spades are trumps		♦	6		
Spades are trumps		♣♧	—		
♠♤	Q 6	N W E S		♠♤	J 2
♥	6	N W E S		♥	—
♦	5 4	N W E S		♦	3 2
♣♧	8	N W E S		♣♧	9 5
West to lead		♠♤	A K 8 4 3		
West to lead		♥	—		
West to lead		♦	A		
West to lead		♣♧	—		

Here declarer is South, spades are trump and the declarer can cash his two top spades, drawing all the defender's trumps, and claim the rest of the tricks. But if West, on the lead, plays a heart, covered by dummy's ace, East should ruff high with his jack of spades. Now, if South overruffs with the ace or king, West's queen will be promoted into a winner and the defense is assured of an otherwise unavailable trick.
