= Percentage play =

Type of play

Percentage play in contract bridge is a play influenced by mathematical factors when more than one reasonable line of play is available. It is a generic name for plays in which declarer maximizes the chances for obtaining a certain number of tricks or the maximum number of tricks when considering the suit in isolation. Sometimes the percentage play is not the correct play considering the hand as a whole as an avoidance play or safety play may be more appropriate.

In matchpoint games, which use comparative scoring, overtricks are very important, accordingly most hands are played simply to achieve the greatest number of tricks possible and risks may be taken to achieve overtricks that would not be considered at other types of scoring.

| South in 3NT; Matchpoints | | ♠♤ | A | | |
| South in 3NT; Matchpoints | | ♥ | 5 3 2 | | |
| South in 3NT; Matchpoints | | ♦ | 5 3 2 | | |
| South in 3NT; Matchpoints | | ♣♧ | A K Q 10 5 3 | | |
| ♠♤ | Q J 10 3 2 | N W E S | | ♠♤ | 9 8 7 5 |
| ♥ | Q 4 | N W E S | | ♥ | K 8 7 6 |
| ♦ | Q 10 6 | N W E S | | ♦ | 9 8 7 |
| ♣♧ | 9 7 6 | N W E S | | ♣♧ | J 2 |
| Lead: ♠Q | | ♠♤ | K 6 4 | | |
| Lead: ♠Q | | ♥ | A J 10 9 | | |
| Lead: ♠Q | | ♦ | A K J 4 | | |
| Lead: ♠Q | | ♣♧ | 8 4 | | |

Against a contract of 3NT West opens with the ♠Q, and the ♠A wins in dummy. In many types of bridge this hand calls for a safety play in which declarer reaches his hand (perhaps with the ♦A) and leads a ♣4 putting in the ♣10. This will ensure communication between the hands since the ♠A has already been knocked out.

However, this is not the percentage play. Approximately 68% of the time the clubs will be found three in one hand and two in the other (a 3-2 break) and simply cashing the ♣A, K and Q will result in an additional trick. This is the play with the highest percentage of bringing in all the tricks.

If the west hand had ♣J976 the percentage play would result in only 3 club tricks and 8 tricks in all so the contract would fail, but that is not likely to happen. At matchpoints the best play would be to try to take the percentage play in as many suits as possible. The declarer would win on the board and play the ♥2 and finesse in hearts. West winning with the ♥Q might persist with spades, but South wins in hand with ♠K and plays all the good clubs, later taking the heart finesse again to make 12 tricks.

The percentage play can also vary based on how many tricks are wanted or needed out of a suit:

A K J 6

5 4 2

If declarer needs all of the tricks, the percentage play is to play one of the high honours first, then finesse the jack followed by the other high honour. This hopes to find West with Qxx, which is more likely than finding Qx with East. However, if only three tricks are needed, then it is better to cash first the two top honours and then lead low towards the jack.

== See also ==
- Suit combinations
