= Trump coup =

Coup in contract bridge

The trump coup is a contract bridge coup used when the hand on lead (typically the dummy) has no trumps remaining, while the next hand in rotation has only trumps, including a high one that would have been onside for a direct finesse if a trump could have been led. The play involves forcing that hand to ruff, only to be overruffed. A similar motive is met in coup en passant, where indirect finesse is used instead of direct.

In an earlier text by George S. Coffin, he names the trump coup as an "Overruff Finesse Endplay".

== Example ==
In the end position below, spades are trump and the lead is in dummy (North). The king of spades is onside, but declarer (South) cannot finesse against it because dummy has no trumps remaining.

		♠♤	—		
		♥	A		
		♦	—		
		♣♧	3 2		
♠♤	—	N W E S		♠♤	K 2
♥	6	N W E S		♥	7
♦	—	N W E S		♦	—
♣♧	A K	N W E S		♣♧	—
		♠♤	A Q		
		♥	2		
		♦	—		
		♣♧	—		

In preparation for the trump coup, declarer must ensure that his right hand opponent has only trump cards and plays the ♥A first. Next, when a club is led from dummy, East must ruff, and South can overruff with the ace or queen according to which spade East plays.

A trump coup is not possible in a double-finesse position, since declarer with a holding like A-Q-10 over defender's K-J-x would take the first trump trick and then would have to give the defender a free finesse. In effect, a trump coup against a king (or rather, the second-highest remaining trump) must find it guarded by exactly one other trump. (If East held another card instead of the small trump, say a diamond, North-South could still play the hand as just described, but the trump coup would be unnecessary as South could just drop the king of spades instead.)

Similarly, with A-K-J of trumps in hand, a trump coup against Q-x-x on the right is possible, and so on.

To execute a trump coup, declarer must have exactly the same number of trumps as the defender. If declarer had more trumps, entry could not be given to dummy at the critical point when the defender will have only trumps remaining. Sometimes a declarer with too many trumps, but needing to do a trump coup, can set up the desired position by entering dummy and leading a suit he can ruff, to shorten his own trumps.

== Grand coup ==
If the card which is ruffed in order to shorten the trumps would have been a winner, the play is called a grand coup:

South in 6♣		♠♤	8		
South in 6♣		♥	6 5 2		
South in 6♣		♦	K 3 2		
South in 6♣		♣♧	K Q 10 8 5 3		
♠♤	10 7 3	N W E S		♠♤	9 6 4 2
♥	J 8 3	N W E S		♥	Q 10 4
♦	J 10 9	N W E S		♦	A 8 6 5 4
♣♧	J 9 7 4	N W E S		♣♧	6
Lead:♦J		♠♤	A K Q J 5		
Lead:♦J		♥	A K 7 4		
Lead:♦J		♦	Q 7		
Lead:♦J		♣♧	A 2		

South, having opened strong 2♣, plays in 6♣. West leads a diamond to East's ace, who returns a heart to South's ace. South plays A-K of trumps and discovers the bad break.

Now, South has to ruff his high spades in dummy twice to shorten its trumps to the same length as West; he cashes two high spades, discarding a heart from dummy, and ruffs the spade queen. Next, he enters his hand with the ♦Q and ruffs another spade. He cashes the ♦K, and reenters his hand with the ♥K. At that point, North and West have only two trumps each—K 10 and J 9 respectively. Either a heart or a spade from South's hand completes the coup.

== Endplay variation ==
A similar tactic can also be used to create an endplay situation, with similar results to the more ordinary trump coup:

Cavendish (1876)		♠♤	9 5 4 3 2		
Cavendish (1876)		♥	10		
Cavendish (1876)		♦	—		
Cavendish (1876)		♣♧	—		
♠♤	J 10 8 7	N W E S		♠♤	Q 6
♥	—	N W E S		♥	9
♦	J 8	N W E S		♦	—
♣♧	—	N W E S		♣♧	9 8 3
		♠♤	A K		
		♥	—		
		♦	—		
		♣♧	J 7 6 5		

In this six-card ending, originally given as a whist hand, clubs are trumps and the lead is in the North hand.

To win five of the six remaining tricks (one trick must be lost in any event, as the ♣98 form a sure winner in the East hand), the ♥10 must be led from dummy and South must ruff with a low club (executing the grand coup in doing so). After this the ♠AK must be cashed, and finally a low club led from hand. East can now win only one trump trick—if he takes this trick he will be endplayed into leading into South's remaining trump tenace and lose the last two tricks, while if he ducks, he will of course prosaically lose his ♣9 or ♣8 to South's ♣J and win only trick 13.

South wins a trick less if he plays otherwise, as the tempo of the situation is altered and it will be South who becomes endplayed at trick 12 to give up a second trump winner to East—if he does not ruff dummy's heart winner, after giving up the first trump trick to East, the latter will still have a major suit card at trick 11 in addition to his two trumps, which he will lead to compel South to ruff and again lead trumps up to East. If he executes the coup but then fails to cash both spades before touching trumps, East will lead his remaining spade to force South back on lead to give up a second trump trick.

Often, for a trump coup to work, the key defender must have a suitable distribution in other suits, so that he cannot ruff a declarer's winner prematurely.

== See also ==
- Smother play
- Devil's coup
