= Morton's fork coup =

Coup in contract bridge

Morton's fork is a coup in contract bridge that forces an opponent to choose between

1. letting declarer establish extra tricks in the suit led; or
2. losing the opportunity to win any trick in the suit led.

It takes its name from the expression Morton's fork.

== Examples ==
=== Basic ===
| South in 3NT | | ♠♤ | A | | |
| South in 3NT | | ♥ | A K 3 | | |
| South in 3NT | | ♦ | K J 8 5 3 | | |
| South in 3NT | | ♣♧ | Q J 9 8 | | |
| ♠♤ | Q J 10 9 6 4 | N W E S | | ♠♤ | 7 2 |
| ♥ | J 10 2 | N W E S | | ♥ | 8 7 6 4 |
| ♦ | A 6 | N W E S | | ♦ | 10 9 7 4 |
| ♣♧ | A 4 | N W E S | | ♣♧ | 6 3 2 |
| Lead: ♠Q | | ♠♤ | K 8 5 3 | | |
| Lead: ♠Q | | ♥ | Q 9 5 | | |
| Lead: ♠Q | | ♦ | Q 2 | | |
| Lead: ♠Q | | ♣♧ | K 10 7 5 | | |

| West | North | East | South |
|---|---|---|---|
| 1♠ | Dble | Pass | 1NT |
| Pass | 3NT | Pass | Pass |
| Pass | | | |

From the auction, West must own both the ♣A and the ♦A.

After winning the ♠Q lead with the ♠A, lead a low heart to the Queen. Then lead a low diamond.

- If West takes his ace, South takes the remaining four diamond tricks. South makes 3NT with 2 spade, 3 heart and 4 diamond tricks.
- If West ducks, South wins with the ♦K and leads clubs knocking out the ace. South makes 3NT with 2 spade, 3 heart, 1 diamond and 3 club tricks.

=== More complex ===
South receives the lead of the ♦J against his contract of 6♠. It appears that South has both a heart and a club loser. Although South can establish another winner in diamonds, just one discard on a diamond honor does not help.

| South in 6♠ | | ♠♤ | K Q 9 8 | | |
| South in 6♠ | | ♥ | K 9 8 | | |
| South in 6♠ | | ♦ | K Q 9 | | |
| South in 6♠ | | ♣♧ | K 9 8 | | |
| ♠♤ | 3 | N W E S | | ♠♤ | 2 |
| ♥ | A 10 5 3 | N W E S | | ♥ | J 6 4 2 |
| ♦ | J 10 7 3 2 | N W E S | | ♦ | A 8 6 5 4 |
| ♣♧ | J 5 4 | N W E S | | ♣♧ | Q 3 2 |
| Lead: ♦J | | ♠♤ | A J 10 7 6 5 4 | | |
| Lead: ♦J | | ♥ | Q 7 | | |
| Lead: ♦J | | ♦ | — | | |
| Lead: ♦J | | ♣♧ | A 10 7 6 | | |

There are two ways that the contract can be made. South might manage to avoid any heart loser, or South might take two heart tricks, in which case South could discard one club on the ♥K and another club on a diamond honor.

Judging from the opening lead that East holds the ♦A, South plays the ♦9 from dummy at the first trick, ruffs in hand, and draws trumps. Hoping that West holds the ♥A, South leads the ♥7, executing Morton's Fork:

- If West takes the ♥A, declarer can win any return, unblock hearts, take a ruffing finesse against the ace of diamonds, then discard two clubs on dummy's winning diamond and ♥K. In this case South loses only a heart.
- If West ducks South's lead of the ♥7, declarer wins dummy's ♥K, takes a ruffing finesse against the ace of diamonds, and throws the ♥Q on the established diamond winner. In this case South loses only a club.

Note that declarer must be careful not to play a high diamond on the opening lead, as East could then withhold the ace. That would force the declarer to choose a discard prematurely. South must get a discard on a diamond honor eventually, but not before West has been forced to decide whether to take the ♥A or duck it. Only then will South know whether to discard a heart or a club on the diamond winner.

== Example defense ==
| South in 6♣ | | ♠♤ | K 2 | | |
| South in 6♣ | | ♥ | — | | |
| South in 6♣ | | ♦ | 10 7 5 4 | | |
| South in 6♣ | | ♣♧ | K Q J 10 6 5 4 | | |
| ♠♤ | A J 7 6 | N W E S | | ♠♤ | 10 5 4 3 |
| ♥ | A K J 2 | N W E S | | ♥ | 7 6 5 4 3 |
| ♦ | J 9 | N W E S | | ♦ | Q 6 3 2 |
| ♣♧ | 7 3 2 | N W E S | | ♣♧ | — |
| Lead: ♣2 | | ♠♤ | Q 9 8 | | |
| Lead: ♣2 | | ♥ | Q 10 9 8 | | |
| Lead: ♣2 | | ♦ | A K 8 | | |
| Lead: ♣2 | | ♣♧ | A 9 8 | | |

Robert Gray gives this spectacular example of an impossible defense to Morton's Fork. West leads the ♣2 against South's six club contract. South wins and initiates the coup by leading the ♠8.

If West takes the ♠A, he might as well continue with the ♣3. South wins and leads a heart, covered and ruffed. A third club to South's hand, and another heart, again covered and ruffed. A diamond to South's hand, and a third heart covered and ruffed. The ♠K is cashed, and then another diamond to South's hand allows dummy's last two losing diamonds to be discarded on the ♠Q and the established heart.

If West ducks the ♠A at the second trick, South sets up a heart via ruffing finesses as before, discarding dummy's losing spade on the established heart. Now a third diamond from South either wins or establishes dummy's ♦10, and South has twelve tricks: one spade, one heart, three diamonds and seven clubs.

Gray points out that to defeat the contract, West must lead the ♥2 at trick one. (He goes on, "And I hope that is not too obvious.") Against the opening lead of the ♥2, South must discard from dummy before West has been forced to play to South's spade lead. If South discards dummy's spade at trick one, West's ♠A will later take dummy's ♠K, and South must lose a spade and a diamond. If South discards a diamond from dummy, West ducks South's spade lead, saving his ♠A for the ♠Q, and again South must lose a spade and a diamond.

Gray speculates on a name for West's opening lead coup: "This play of giving declarer a trick early ... is probably worth a name. The Anti-Morton Coup or the Down With Morton Coup spring to mind, but these names seem rather unfriendly. Let us settle for the Morton Coup Defense."

== See also ==
- Belladonna coup
