= Bridge ethics =

Etiquette to be observed while playing bridge

Contract bridge can be a friendly, informal social game, or a competitive game when played in formal club or tournament settings. The rules require players to conduct themselves ethically and to be courteous at all times. The rules of the game and expectations for ethical play are codified in the official Laws of Duplicate Contract Bridge and its published interpretations; the rules define which actions at the table are and are not permitted and remedies for rule infractions and irregularities. Players are expected to respect the norms of social courtesy and behavior; duplicate bridge sponsoring organizations (clubs, regional, national, zonal and world organizations) can define additional standards for player's conduct, including the penalties for violation of personal conduct such as rudeness and other breaches of discipline not covered by applicable civil laws. Some aspects of the rules may be interpreted more strictly in a high-level tournament than in an informal social game.

== Laws of Duplicate Contract Bridge ==
The following aspects of conduct in game play are covered in the Laws of Duplicate Contract Bridge.

=== General points ===
Any contestant remaining at a table throughout a session is primarily responsible for maintaining proper conditions of play at the table. (Law 7D)

=== Tournament director ===
The Tournament director's powers, duties and responsibilities are defined under laws 81 - 93. As the official representative of the Tournament Organiser he is responsible for managing the tournament and applying the Laws applicable to it. His duties (under Law 81) include:

1. to maintain discipline and ensure the orderly progress of the game.
2. to administer and interpret these Laws and to advise players of their rights and responsibilities thereunder.
3. to rectify an error or irregularity of which he becomes aware in any manner, within the Correction Period... (The Correction Period is usually 30 minutes after the final entry of the scores)
4. to assess rectification when applicable and to exercise the powers given him... (to penalise or suspend players)
5. to waive rectification for cause, in his discretion, upon the request of the non-offending side.
6. to adjust disputes.
7. to refer any matter to an appropriate committee.
8. to report the results for the official record if the Tournament Organiser requires it and to deal with any matters delegated to him by the Tournament Organiser

Law 81 also states: The Director (not the players) has the responsibility for rectifying irregularities and redressing damage.

=== Procedure following an irregularity ===
Unless prohibited by Law, any player may call attention to an irregularity during the auction, whether or not it is his turn to call. (the dummy is subject to restrictions to this rule during play) and The Director must be summoned at once when attention is drawn to an irregularity.. A player does not generally have to draw attention to an irregularity committed by their side (Laws 9A4 and 72B2) but must not attempt to conceal an infraction (Law 72B3)

=== Cheating ===
Law 73B2 states: The gravest possible offence is for a partnership to exchange information through pre-arranged methods of communication other than those sanctioned in these laws.

There have been several instances of bridge players found or accused of cheating in high-level tournaments, including in world championships.

=== Tempo ===
Players are expected to bid and play "in tempo", i.e. without undue haste or delay. Occasionally, in more complex situations, a player may need more time to consider their bid or play options, but players may not draw inferences based on their partner's break in tempo; doing so may draw a penalty. (see example below)

In duplicate play, "stop" cards are commonly used during auctions to notify the opponents of a skip bid. After the bid is made, the next player is expected to wait 10 seconds before bidding. A quick Pass after an opponent opens the bidding with 2♠, for example, strongly implies a lack of card values.

=== Review and explanation of calls ===
(Law 20)

1. At their turn to bid, or after the final pass, a player may ask for a review of the auction. The full auction (up to that point), including alerts, must be given.
2. A player may request information about a particular call, but this risks giving unauthorized information.
3. A player is entitled to information not only about calls made but also about relevant calls that were not made, and any inferences that can be drawn from them.
4. A player may not ask a question for the benefit of their partner.

If misinformation is provided (whether inadvertently or not) and not corrected then a pair may be afforded restitution by the Tournament Director. The assumed declarer or dummy should give the correct explanation at the end of the auction but before the opening lead is faced up. (When the Tournament Director can give the last defender a chance to make another bid and the auction may continue). Defenders may not correct misinformation until the end of the play of the hand (to do so earlier would give unauthorized information to their partner)

=== Unauthorized information ===
Law 16 states that

Players are authorized to base their calls and plays on information from legal calls and plays and from mannerisms of opponents. To base a call or play on other extraneous information may be an infraction of law.

When a player accidentally receives unauthorized information about a board he is playing or has yet to play, as by looking at the wrong hand; by overhearing calls, results or remarks; by seeing cards at another table; or by seeing a card belonging to another player at his own table before the auction begins, the Director should be notified forthwith, preferably by the recipient of the information. If the Director considers that the information could interfere with normal play, he may:

1. Adjust Positions
  if the type of contest and scoring permit, adjust the players' positions at the table, so that the player with information about one hand will hold that hand; or,
2. Appoint Substitute
  with the concurrence of all four players, appoint a temporary substitute to replace the player who received the unauthorized information; or,
3. Award an Adjusted Score
  forthwith award an artificial adjusted score.

=== Conduct and etiquette ===
Law 74 deals with a correct attitude (courteous and avoid annoying other players), etiquette (e.g. paying attention, not making gratuitous remarks) and violations of procedure (e.g. boasting about success, varying tempo to disconcert opponents, trying to look at opponent's cards or where they played the card from in the hand).

=== Appeals ===
A contestant or his captain may appeal for a review of any ruling made at his table by a Director. Any such request if deemed to lack merit may be subject to an additional sanction imposed by Regulation. (Law 92A) It is common practice for a side seeking an appeal to have to make a pecuniary deposit, which will be refunded if the appeal has merit (even if it is lost), and a side instigating an appeal without merit may also have their score reduced.

Such an appeal is normally held by an Appeals committee (usually 3 experienced players) by a Referee (A single experienced player) or by the Director in Charge. Tournament Directors, who make the first ruling, are not necessarily (or even usually), world-class bridge players, and the additional experience of an Appeals committee provides security that a correct ruling is made.

The Appeal committee may not overrule the Director in charge on a point of law, regulation or on disciplinary matters (but may recommend a change of ruling) (Law 93B3). Thus most Appeals deal with 'judgement' decisions - the use of unauthorised information (Law 16B), the effect of misinformation (Law 21), or when a claim for a certain number of tricks is disputed (Law 70).

In some bridge tournaments, players may first approach an official 'screener', who will take details and advise them, based on that information, if they may have possible grounds for an appeal. This does not affect a contestant's right to an appeal; however, it helps ensure that the Appeal committee hear appropriate cases.

== Examples of Bridge Ethics ==
=== Use of Unauthorised Information from Partner (Law 16B) ===
North - opens the bidding with '1 Heart' East - overcalls by bidding '1 Spade' South - responds by bidding '2 hearts' West - makes a bid of '4 Spades'

This bid by West, because it has raised the level of the auction by more than 1 (from 2 hearts to 4 spades), is known as a 'jump bid' and most regulating authorities require him to either say 'Stop' or place the 'Stop card' on the table from the 'bidding box'. North is then required to pause for 10 seconds before making their next call (this gives him time to adjust and reconsider his action).

North - immediately passes i.e. does not wait for the 10 seconds.

This, of itself, is not an infraction; however, it does communicate that North has a relatively weak hand and does not wish to do anything over the 4 spade call. This additional information communicated is 'unauthorised information' and South must "carefully avoid taking advantage" from this information (Law 73C1)

East and South both 'pass' (this finishes the Auction) - and when the hand is played, East makes 10 tricks (i.e. his contract)

It turns out that South held 2 Aces in his hand. Since it was found that "a significant proportion of the class of players in question, using the methods of the partnership" (Law 16B1b) would have doubled the final contract (the double is described as a 'logical alternative') and that South's 'pass' was 'demonstrably suggested' (Law 16B1a) by the fast pass by North, the final contract was changed to '4 spades doubled', making 10 tricks (which scores more for East-West)

(This is a specific example of abuse of a 'Break In tempo' (BIT) - most cases when a BIT occurs happen when a player thinks for a long time before making a call.)

=== Use of Unexpected Explanation ===
North - opens the bidding with '1 - Heart' East - (holding a hand with 3 spades, 1 heart, 2 diamonds and 7 clubs) - bids '3 - clubs'

However East-West are playing a convention that the actual meaning of this bid is that it shows Spades and Diamonds. West promptly alerts the bid (because it has an unexpected meaning) and, when asked, provides the correct explanation - this explanation is unauthorised information to East, who must not make use of it during the auction (or play). Note that the mis-bid by East is not an infraction.

South - passes West - bids '3-Spades'

West is actually only giving suit preference (he prefers Spades to Diamonds) however East must regard the bid as being natural (to East, he has shown clubs and partner has a spade suit and the strength to bid over the 3-club bid)

North - passes East - bids '4-spades'

With 3 card support and a ruffing value, East's hand is better than it might be and so 'carefully avoiding taking advantage of the information' he has, he raises to game.

South (who held 5 spades) then doubled (and three passes followed).

East has behaved ethically throughout the auction (West had no unauthorised information). The result of his ethics is that East-West incurred an enormous penalty. An unethical East might have rebid his clubs (such a rebid is sometimes known as 'unauthorised panic') hoping that West might realise that the club bid was natural. In such a situation a Director is likely to change the result of the hand to '4-spades doubled' and, since the club rebid was a deliberate attempt to take advantage of the unauthorised information, impose an additional penalty (Law 72C2).
