= Morton's fork =

False dilemma in which contradictory observations lead to the same conclusion

A Morton's fork is a type of false dilemma in which contradictory observations lead to the same conclusion. Its name refers to the rationalising of a benevolence by the 15th century English prelate John Morton.

The term in its broad application dates at least to the mid-19th century, although Francis Bacon noted in 1622 that it was established by that point in specific reference to Morton's original argument.

== Morton's argument ==
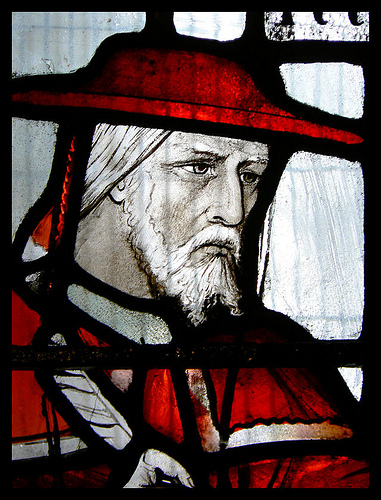
John Morton, the namesake of Morton's fork

Under Henry VII, John Morton was made Archbishop of Canterbury in 1486 and Lord Chancellor in 1487. He rationalised requiring the payment of a benevolence (tax) to King Henry by reasoning that someone living modestly must be saving money and therefore could afford the benevolence, whereas someone living extravagantly was obviously rich and therefore could also afford the benevolence. The phrase "Morton's fork" may have been coined by another of Henry's supporters, Richard Foxe.

== Other uses ==
"Morton's fork coup" is a manoeuvre in the game of bridge that uses the principle of Morton's fork.

== See also ==
- Catch-22
- Hobson's choice
