= Deschapelles coup =

Type of lead in game of bridge

In bridge, the Deschapelles coup is the lead of an unsupported honor to create an entry in partner's hand; often confused with the Merrimac coup, the lead of an unsupported honor to kill an entry in an opponent's hand.

This sacrificial play was invented by Alexandre Deschapelles, a 19th-century French chess and whist player.

== Example ==
Geir Helgemo executed this Deschapelles Coup in a 1998 tournament.

South in 4♦		♠	J 6		
South in 4♦		♥	A J 10 8 3		
South in 4♦		♦	Q 6 2		
South in 4♦		♣	K J 8		
♠	5 4 3 2	N W E S		♠	K Q 10 8 7
♥	Q 5	N W E S		♥	K 9 6 2
♦	J	N W E S		♦	K 9 7
♣	10 9 7 5 3 2	N W E S		♣	A
Lead: ♠2		♠	A 9		
Lead: ♠2		♥	7 4		
Lead: ♠2		♦	A 10 8 5 4 3		
Lead: ♠2		♣	Q 6 4		

Helgemo was East against South's 4♦. West led a small spade, Helgemo put up the ♠Q and South won the ♠A. South then returned a spade to Helgamo's ♠K. Helgemo cashed the ♣A and switched to the ♥K (the coup). Dummy won the ♥A and played the ♦Q to the ♦K, ♦A and ♦J.

Now declarer tried to enter dummy with the ♣K, but Helgemo ruffed, put West in with the ♥Q, and ruffed the club return for down two.

It would not have helped South to duck the ♥K because Helgemo would simply have continued hearts, winding up with a trick in each suit.

And it would not have helped Helgemo to switch to a low heart at trick four. South wins West's ♥Q with the ♥A, leads the ♦Q, covered and won, and then leads another heart to endplay Helgemo.

This is a particularly unusual Deschapelles coup, because it is combined with a Merrimac coup. The same play of the ♥K both establishes an entry for West and takes out an entry to dummy.
