= Coup en passant =

Type of coup in contract bridge

Coup en passant is a type of coup in contract bridge where trump trick(s) are "stolen" by trying to ruff a card after the player who has the master trump(s).

Just as the trump coup resembles a direct finesse, except that trumps are not the suit led, so the coup en passant similarly resembles an indirect finesse.

== Examples ==
		♠	—		
		♥	A		
		♦	—		
		♣	3 2		
♠	—	N W E S		♠	A
♥	6	N W E S		♥	7
♦	A	N W E S		♦	3
♣	A	N W E S		♣	—
South to lead		♠	K		
South to lead		♥	2		
South to lead		♦	2		
South to lead		♣	—		

In this example, spades are trump, and declarer (South) takes two tricks by playing hearts first. Then, with clubs led from the dummy, declarer ruffs if and only if East does not. South's diamond loser will go under East's ace of spades on one of the last two tricks, and South's king will take the other trick. Here both players have the same number of trumps, but the hand would play the same way if either or both had a small trump in place of the small diamond. The important thing is that declarer must have few enough trumps that dummy can be entered at the critical time.

♠	—		
♥	8 6		
♦	10 4		
♣	—		
N E S		♠	J 10
N E S		♥	—
N E S		♦	K Q
N E S		♣	—
♠	5 3		
♥	—		
♦	2 5		
♣	—		

Coup en passant can be performed even with several high trumps in the opponent's hand. In the example, South would lose all remaining tricks if the lead were in East's hand. However, if a heart is played from dummy, and East ruffs, South will discard the losing diamond (what is, in effect, a loser on loser play). If East discards, South will ruff, "stealing" a trick.

== See also ==
- Trump promotion
