= Distinction without a difference =

Type of logical fallacy

A distinction without a difference is an informal fallacy where an author or speaker attempts to describe a distinction between two things where no discernible difference exists. It is particularly used when a word or phrase has connotations associated with it that one party to an argument prefers to avoid.

For example, a person might say "I did not lie; I merely stretched the truth a little bit."

== Form of the fallacy ==
- Claim X is made where the truth of the claim requires a distinct difference between A and B.
- There is no distinct difference between A and B.
- Therefore, claim X is incorrectly claimed to be true.

== Example ==
In the following conversation:

- Sergio: There is no way I would ever even consider taking dancing lessons.
- Kitty: How about I ask my friend from work to teach you?
- Sergio: If you know someone who is willing to teach me how to dance, then I am willing to learn, sure.

Sergio's fallacy is thinking that being taught by someone is different from taking a lesson.

== See also ==
- Connotation
- Connotation (semiotics)
- Distancing language
- Euphemism
- False dilemma
- Spin (propaganda)
