= Belladonna coup =

Contract bridge coup

The Belladonna coup is the play of a low card away from an accompanying high card, giving the opponents the impossible choice between setting up a winner for declarer and abandoning an attack on another suit.

The provenance of the following spectacular hand, which illustrates the Belladonna coup, is uncertain. A similar layout, with the same key play, is discussed by Victor Mollo. Both sources attribute the coup to Giorgio Belladonna, for many years a cornerstone of the Italian Blue Team. (Belladonna later said that he could not recall having made the key play.) It is said that Belladonna played it as described in a European Community championship in Belgium during the 1980s. But it is also said that Paul Lukacs, the game's pre-eminent composer of single-dummy problems, composed it away from the table.

South in 4♠		♠♤	8 6 3		
South in 4♠		♥	K 6		
South in 4♠		♦	A K 5 3 2		
South in 4♠		♣♧	K 6 4		
♠♤	K 7 2	N W E S		♠♤	10 4
♥	Q 10 5 3	N W E S		♥	A 9 7 4
♦	10 6	N W E S		♦	Q J 8 7
♣♧	9 8 3 2	N W E S		♣♧	J 10 5
Lead: ♠2		♠♤	A Q J 9 5		
Lead: ♠2		♥	J 8 2		
Lead: ♠2		♦	9 4		
Lead: ♠2		♣♧	A Q 7		

Against South's 4♠, West leads a small trump to East's ♠10 and South's ♠J. South has several ways to play for ten tricks, which include finding the ♥A onside (50% probability of success), or finding the diamonds 3-3 (36%). The best prospect is to ruff a heart in dummy, but the attack on trumps jeopardizes that plan. If South mis-times the play, the defense can manage to lead three rounds of trumps and win the ♠K, before declarer can ruff the third heart.

Instead of relying on the position of the heart ace or a favorable diamond split, South played for the nearly sure thing by taking a safety play in hearts.

South led to dummy's ♦K and played the ♥6 away from the ♥K! This gave the E-W an impossible choice:

- If East takes the trick with either the ♥A or (if he has it) the ♥Q, South eventually takes a heart trick by force of cards. East can continue trumps safely from his side, but South would no longer need to ruff a heart to reach ten tricks.
- If West takes the trick – say, by capturing the ♥J with the ♥Q – then South might never take a heart trick. But West could not lead another spade without sacrificing his trump trick. South can't be stopped from either ruffing a heart in dummy, or (if West leads another trump) from taking five spades in his own hand.

Notice that South gives up the best chance of making a heart trick (leading toward the ♥K). By giving up the chance for one trick in hearts, South virtually guarantees ten tricks (now only a very unlikely defensive minor suit ruff can defeat the contract).

Notice the presence of the avoidance play theme in this deal.

== See also ==
- Morton's fork coup
