= Safety play =

Strategy in Bridge

Safety play in contract bridge is a generic name for plays in which declarer maximizes the chances for fulfilling the contract (or achieving a certain score) by ignoring a chance for a higher score. Declarer uses safety plays to cope with potentially unfavorable layouts of the opponent's cards. In so doing, declarer attempts to ensure the contract even in worst-case scenarios, by giving up the possibility of overtricks.

Safety plays adapt declarer's strategy to the scoring system. In IMP-scoring tournaments and rubber bridge, the primary scoring reward comes from fulfilling the contract and overtricks are of little marginal value. Therefore, safety plays are an important part of declarer technique at quantitative scoring.

In matchpoint games, which use comparative scoring, overtricks are very important. Therefore, although safety plays have a certain role at matchpoints, they are normally avoided if the odds for making the contract are good and overtricks are likely.

== Definition ==
The term safety play is difficult to define crisply. The Bridge World glossary defines safety play as "the surest line to make the contract, disregarding extra tricks that might be made in some other way." Marshall Miles has defined it as "playing in such a way as to lose a trick with average breaks in order to avoid losing additional tricks with bad breaks."

Conflating discussions from various sources yields the following points, each descriptive of safety play characteristics:

- A safety play is made in a single suit. In the context of that suit, it can often be described using other terms that might or might not pertain to the full deal, such as avoidance play, percentage play, coup or duck.
- A safety play, although made in a single suit, is intended to maximize declarer's chances to make the contract.
- A safety play usually gives up the opportunity to win as many tricks as possible in a particular suit in order to gain an advantage on the full deal. It therefore is sometimes compared to an insurance premium.

== Examples ==
Safety plays have a role at both comparative scoring and quantitative scoring, although they are used more often at quantitative scoring because they tend to give up on overtricks.

=== Safety play at IMPs ===
		♠	K J		
		♥	Q 5		
		♦	A J 7 2		
		♣	Q 8 7 5 3		
♠	10 9 7 3	N W E S		♠	Q 8 5 4 2
♥	10 8 6 4	N W E S		♥	9 7 2
♦	9	N W E S		♦	K 10 8 5
♣	J 9 4 2	N W E S		♣	10
		♠	A 6		
		♥	A K J 3		
		♦	Q 6 4 3		
		♣	A K 6		

The example deal at left is from a team of four game.

South plays 6NT against the lead of the ♠10. Dummy's ♠K wins, and the ♣A and ♣K are played. East discards a small spade on the second club trick.

This particular hand is one of a relatively small group of (non-trivial) deals in which perfect safety is available after the third trick. Single-dummy, using a safety play in diamonds, it is possible to guarantee the contract against any remaining distribution and play of the E-W cards.

South started by expecting to win five clubs, one or two diamonds, four hearts and two spades, but the 4-1 split in clubs complicates matters. Still, a safety play in diamonds will bring in twelve tricks.

It's just coincidence, but the proper diamond play on this hand is the same as the percentage play with this diamond holding, considering the suit in isolation. The best play for three diamond tricks is to play the ♦A, and then lead toward either the ♦Q or the ♦J. This play brings in three diamond tricks 73% of the time.

Using that play on this deal brings in twelve tricks 100% of the time. Cash the ♦A, and lead small toward the ♦Q. Then:

- If diamonds are 3-2, South will always win three clubs, three diamonds, four hearts and two spades.
- If diamonds are 4-1 and West has the singleton, East cannot play the ♦K on the second lead without setting up both the ♦Q and the ♦J. If East plays low and West shows out, concede a club and take four clubs, two diamonds, four hearts and two spades. The same play works if East began with five diamonds.
- If diamonds are 4-1 and East has the singleton, West can capture the ♦Q with the ♦K. But in that case West is known to hold four cards in each minor, and on the run of the major suits will be squeezed out of his guard in either diamonds or clubs. In with the ♦K, West can attack dummy's entry in diamonds or in clubs, but not both. The same play works if West began with five diamonds.

Note that South gives up the 14% chance of four diamond tricks (finessing the ♦J and then cashing the ♦A, hoping for the ♦K onside and doubleton) in exchange for insuring the contract against any diamond break. If South begins the diamonds by finessing the ♦J, the contract fails against king-fourth in the East hand.

=== Safety play at matchpoints ===
Safety play usually involves giving up the chance of the maximum result in exchange for the best chance of making the contract. So one seldom sees safety plays made at matchpoints or board-a-match. But even at those forms of scoring, there can be good reasons to make safety plays.

Suppose that, at pairs, declarer is in a standard contract, one that the majority of the field will surely reach. However, the defense makes an unorthodox opening lead, presenting declarer with a possible overtrick. There may now be a way, unavailable to other declarers, that will guarantee the contract while retaining good chances for the overtrick.

Or declarer might be in an unusually good contract. Hugh Kelsey gives this example:

♠	5
♥	7 6 3
♦	A Q 9 7 5 4
♣	J 8 4
N S
♠	J 10 8 3
♥	A K Q 4
♦	K 6 3
♣	Q 2

The bidding goes 1♥ — 2♥; Pass, and West leads the ♠K and continues with the ♥10.

South is in an unusually good matchpoint contract. Most players will open the South hand with 1NT rather than 1♥. And it is very difficult to reach a heart contract if South opens 1NT or 1♦: either way, North signs off in diamonds.

In any case, 2♥ is both an exceptionally good matchpoint contract and difficult to reach. Assuming reasonably competent defense, plus 130 is the limit playing in diamonds, and plus 120 in notrump contracts.

But there's an easy way to score plus 140 in 2♥: take a safety play in hearts by ducking the first round. This gives up the chance of plus 170 (if hearts break 3-3) in exchange for the best chance of plus 140 (if hearts break either 4-2 or 3-3). Note that playing hearts from the top leads to defeat if hearts are 4-2, the most likely split.

=== Safety play at notrump ===
Safety plays, of course, are not limited to trump contracts. Here is an example of a safety play at notrump.

♠	A 10 8 7 2
♥	A
♦	A 5 3 2
♣	8 4 3
N S
♠	K 9
♥	K 10 2
♦	K 9 6 4
♣	A K 6 2

South declares 3NT and gets the lead of the ♥Q. After winning the ♥A, declarer leads the ♠2 and East plays a small spade. The play of the ♠9 now assures the contract. If West wins the trick he cannot play another heart without giving the ninth trick to declarer and the tempo to develop more in spades. West therefore switches to a diamond and South wins in hand. South overtakes the ♠K with the ♠A – the key play on this hand – and the ♦A assures an entry to two more spade tricks. If spades are played from top the hand might not make if East holds Q J x x and both minor suits fail to break.

== See also ==
- Scoring and tactics in duplicate bridge
- Loser on loser
- Hold up
- Avoidance play
- Suit combinations
- Belladonna coup
