= Grosvenor gambit =

Psychological play in bridge

In the game of bridge, a Grosvenor gambit or Grosvenor Coup is a psychological play, in which the opponent is purposely given the chance to gain one or more tricks, and often even to make the contract, but to do so he must play for his opponents to have acted illogically or incorrectly.

Thus, the opponent likely ends up blaming himself for not taking advantage of the opportunity presented, even though to do so would have been irrational. The benefit of the Grosvenor gambit is supposed to come on future hands, due to a loss of concentration by the player who was taken in by the gambit.

The gambit was named after Philip Grosvenor, a fictional character in a short story by Frederick B. Turner published in The Bridge World, who first discovered the gambit accidentally, and over time developed its theory and deployed it deliberately. The story depicts Grosvenor as often frustrated by opponents who are too obtuse to fall for his ruse. Grosvenor's lifeless body is eventually found bludgeoned to death, his dealing fingers broken, shortly after a bridge tournament in which he used his gambit against the wrong opponents.

A subsequent article by Kit Woolsey in The Bridge World, titled The Grosvenor Gamble, extends the original idea, farcically expounded in the 1973 story, to possible at-the-table applications.

== Example ==
The following deal provides an opportunity for a Grosvenor coup by West:

South in 3NT		♠♤	5 4		
South in 3NT		♥	Q J		
South in 3NT		♦	K 9 8 7 3 2		
South in 3NT		♣♧	7 3 2		
♠♤	8 7 3 2	N W E S		♠♤	Q J 10
♥	A K 10 9	N W E S		♥	6 5 3 2
♦	Q 10 6	N W E S		♦	5
♣♧	5 4	N W E S		♣♧	Q J 10 8 6
Lead: ♥A		♠♤	A K 9 6		
Lead: ♥A		♥	8 7 4		
Lead: ♥A		♦	A J 4		
Lead: ♥A		♣♧	A K 9		

Against South's 3NT West leads ♥A and continues with ♥K and two more winning hearts. South wins the spade continuation, and has to run the diamonds without losing any further tricks. He therefore plans to play the ♦A and next to unblock by playing the ♦J to the ♦K, hoping for a 2–2 split or a singleton ♦Q (this is the percentage play with the given holding). On the actual layout, South cannot succeed. See, however, what happens when West drops the ♦10 under the ♦A. Declarer now has the opportunity to make his contract by next letting the ♦J run. This play, however, is utterly illogical: it can gain only when West has started with Q-10-6, but with that holding West would "never" play the 10 first. So, South plays for a 2–2 holding in diamonds and on the second diamond trick overtakes the ♦J with the ♦K, only to see East show out.

South will regret not having finessed, and – per Grosvenor's theory – will be furious with himself for not taking the illogical play, for not guessing that West would misplay from ♦Q106. Worse yet, North may blame declarer for not having made the impossible play of letting the ♦J ride. East-West are expected to reap even more benefit on the following boards, due to the emotional storm that West has stirred up for North-South.

In his 1973 article, Turner describes various other examples, including one in which a Grosvenor gambit is successfully deployed by declarer.
