= Loser on loser =

Type of declarer's play in Bridge

A loser on loser play is a type of declarer's play in contract bridge, usually in trump contracts, where the declarer discards a loser card (the one that is bound to be given up anyway) on an opponent's winner, instead of ruffing.

The loser on loser technique can be executed for the following goals:

1. to promote tricks in the suit being led (e.g. ruffing finesse)
2. to maintain trump control of the hand,
3. to transfer the ruff to a "safer" suit (e.g. in order to perform a later crossruff).
4. as part of an avoidance play (e.g. the scissors coup)
5. to rectify the count for a subsequent squeeze play.
6. as part of an endplay.

== Example ==
♠	A J 5
♥	9 8 4
♦	A 8 6 2
♣	A Q 5
N S
♠	K Q 10 6
♥	5
♦	K 9 4 3
♣	K J 6 2

After the auction,

West	North	East	South
1♥	Dbl	3♥	4♠
Pass	Pass	Pass	

South plays in a 4-3 spade fit. The defense leads and continues hearts. The declarer has four clubs, two diamonds and four spade tricks in total; however, assuming the most probable 4-2 trump break, if South ruffs the second heart in hand, the opponent with four trumps can gain later control of the hand by ruffing one of South's minor winners and cashing the remaining hearts. Thus, South must discard his losing diamonds on 2nd and 3rd heart, allowing the dummy's shorter trumps to ruff the fourth round, or to regain control with a minor-suit winner. After that, South can draw trumps and claim the rest.

== See also ==
- Safety play
- Duck (bridge)
