= Merrimac coup =

Contract bridge coup

The Merrimac coup (also known as Hobson's coup or Hobson's choice) is a contract bridge coup where a player (usually a defender) sacrifices a high card in order to eliminate a vital entry from an opponent's hand (usually a dummy). It was named after American steam ship Merrimac, which was sunk during the Spanish–American War in 1898 in Santiago de Cuba in an attempt to bottle up the Spanish fleet.

== Example ==
South in 3NT		♠♤	8 5 4		
South in 3NT		♥	10 3		
South in 3NT		♦	K Q J 9 8 5		
South in 3NT		♣♧	A 3		
♠♤	J 10 9 6 3	N W E S		♠♤	A 7
♥	K 9 8	N W E S		♥	Q 7 4 2
♦	6 3	N W E S		♦	A 10 4
♣♧	9 6 5	N W E S		♣♧	K 10 7 2
Lead: ♠J		♠♤	K Q 2		
Lead: ♠J		♥	A J 6 5		
Lead: ♠J		♦	7 2		
Lead: ♠J		♣♧	Q J 8 4		

South is in the contract of 3 no trump. West leads the jack of spades, East taking the ace. East can see plenty of tricks for the declarer in diamonds, but he controls the suit with the ace. If East does not do something, when the declarer regains the lead, he can lead diamonds until East is forced to take the ace, while the declarer still has the ace of clubs as an entry. East must execute the Merrimac coup by playing the king of clubs—even if declarer ducks, another club will knock out the entry to the dummy prematurely, and the declarer will not be able to take any more diamond tricks, which are necessary to fulfill the contract.
