= Devil's coup =

Declarer play in contract bridge

The Devil's Coup is a declarer play in contract bridge that prevents the defense from taking an apparently natural trump trick – often called "the disappearing trump trick".

== Example ==
		♠♤	A 9		
		♥	3		
		♦	—		
		♣♧	—		
♠♤	Q 4	N W E S		♠♤	J 3 2
♥	7	N W E S		♥	—
♦	—	N W E S		♦	—
♣♧	—	N W E S		♣♧	—
North to lead		♠♤	K 10 7		
North to lead		♥	—		
North to lead		♦	—		
North to lead		♣♧	—		

A typical example is shown where spades are trumps and the lead is in dummy (North).

The ♥3 is led. If East ruffs low, then declarer overruffs low and cashes the ace and king of spades. If East ruffs high, declarer overruffs with the ♠K and finesses West for the ♠Q to make the remaining two tricks.

Devil's coups are very rare: not only the trump suit but the side suits must lie well for declarer. In practice, declarer might well decide to play the ace and king of trumps earlier in the hand, in an attempt to drop a doubleton QJ.

== See also ==
- Smother play
- Trump coup
