= Thomas Ward (author) =

Thomas Ward (13 April 1652 – 4 March 1708) was an English author who converted to Catholicism.

== Biography ==
Ward was born at Danby Castle near Guisborough in the North Riding of Yorkshire, just south of the River Tees, in 1652, as the son of a farmer and educated as a Presbyterian at Pickering School. Henry Wharton asserted that he had been a Cambridge scholar, but this is not certain.

Having acted for a time as private tutor, he was led by his theological studies to become a Catholic.

He travelled in France and Italy, and for five or six years held a commission in the papal guard, seeing service against the Ottoman Turks. On the accession of James II Stuart in 1688 he returned to England and employed his learning in controversy.

He died at St-Germain, France, 1708.

== Writings ==
His most popular work, England's Reformation, is a poem in four cantos in the metre of Hudibras. It first appeared posthumously in 1710, and since then in several editions.

His Errata to the Protestant Bible, based on Gregory Martin's work on the same subject, has been frequently republished since its appearance in 1688, once with a preface by Lingard (1810). Bishop John Milner wrote a pamphlet to defend it from one of the Protestant attacks which its republication early in the nineteenth century provoked.

His other works include: Speculum Ecclesiasticum 'Church mirror' (London, 1686?); Some Queries to the Protestants (London, 1687); Monomachia (London, 1678), written about Archbishop Tenison, as also was The Roman Catholic Soldier's Letter (London, 1688).

He also published in 1688 in two broadsheets an epitome of church history, under the title The Tree of Life.

The Controversy of Ordination truly stated (London, 1719) and Controversy with Mr. Ritschel (1819) were posthumous works.

He left two unpublished manuscripts on the Divine Office now in the British Museum, one on the pope's supremacy in the possession of Mr. Gillow, one of the history of England, and others.
