= Crocodile coup =

Play in contract bridge

The Crocodile Coup is a play in the game contract bridge. It is executed by the defense: specifically by the second hand to play to a trick. It is the play of a higher card than might seem necessary, to keep a run of honors from being blocked by a singleton honor being in the other hand with either no entry back to the remaining tricks, or having to return the lead to declarer who can promptly dispose of his losers.

In the following example, West executes the Crocodile Coup:

South in spades; needs 4 tricks		♠♤	—		
South in spades; needs 4 tricks		♥	—		
South in spades; needs 4 tricks		♦	10 7		
South in spades; needs 4 tricks		♣♧	A 9 4		
♠♤	—	N W E S		♠♤	—
♥	—	N W E S		♥	7 3
♦	A Q	N W E S		♦	K
♣♧	Q J 8	N W E S		♣♧	6 3
South leads ♦4; West to play		♠♤	9		
South leads ♦4; West to play		♥	—		
South leads ♦4; West to play		♦	9 4		
South leads ♦4; West to play		♣♧	K 10		

With spades trump, South hopes to win four of the remaining five tricks. South leads the ♦4. Now:

- If West plays the ♦Q, East is forced to win the ♦K. If East then returns a heart, South ruffs and West is squeezed in the minors. If East returns a club, South wins the ♣K and plays the ♠9; again, West is squeezed.
- If West plays the ♦A, executing the Crocodile Coup, West then cashes the ♦Q and holds South to three tricks. West opens the jaws of the ♦AQ to swallow up the ♦K.

If the East-West hands were reversed, it would take no special acumen for East to overtake West's ♦K and cash the ♦Q.
