= Suit combination =

Specific subset of the cards of one suit

In the card game contract bridge, a suit combination is a specific subset of the cards of one suit held respectively in declarer's and dummy's hands at the onset of play. While the ranks of the remaining cards held by the defenders can be deduced precisely, their location is unknown. Optimum suit combination play allows for all possible lies of the cards held by the defenders.

The term is also used for the sequence of plays from the declarer and dummy hands, conditional on intervening plays by the opponents; in other words, declarer's plan or strategy of play given his holdings and his goal for the number of tricks to be taken.

In addition to understanding the possible initial combinations and probabilities for the location of the opponents' cards in a suit, declarer can further inform himself from the bidding, the opening lead and from the prior play of cards in establishing the probable location of remaining cards.

== Examples ==
♥ Q J 9 7 6 5

♥ A 4 3 2

West	East
♥ K 10 8	♥ —
♥ —	♥ K 10 8
♥ K 10	♥ 8
♥ K 8	♥ 10
♥ 10 8	♥ K
♥ 8	♥ K 10
♥ 10	♥ K 8
♥ K	♥ 10 8

The diagram at left shows a heart suit combination with six cards in dummy (North, at top) and four in declarer (South, at bottom). Declarer can deduce that the two opposing hands hold only three hearts - the king, the ten and the eight but their exact location are unknown. The table at right shows the eight possible lies of those three cards; the suit combination and its diagram implicitly include all eight possibilities.

As the number of cards in a particular suit held by declarer and dummy decreases, the number held by the opposing side must increase since there are always thirteen cards in each suit. Expressed mathematically, the number of possible combinations of n cards held by the opponents is 2^{n}. In the above example, three cards are held 2^{3} or 8 ways (2x2x2 = 8).

♥ Q J 9 6 5

♥ A 4 3 2

In this example, the opponents hold four cards in 2^{4} or 16 ways (2x2x2x2 = 16).

♥ Q J 9 5

♥ A 4 3 2

In this example, the opponents hold five cards in 2^{5} or 32 ways (2x2x2x2x2 = 32).

== Representation ==
Typically in standard bridge exposition, not all small cards are explicitly identified and the representation of the hand is made more generic by replacing certain cards with an 'x' where the 'x' represents the 2 or any other card low enough to be equivalent to the 2. The 'x' represents a card below any other that is specified and has no trick-taking capability or potential. The following progression of alternatives allows for higher and higher spot-cards to be deemed insignificant to the analysis.

♥ Q J 9 5

♥ A x x x

♥ Q J 9 6

♥ A x x x

♥ Q J 9 7

♥ A x x x

♥Q J 9 8

♥A x x x

♥ Q J 9 x

♥ A x x x

== Simplified setting ==
Optimal strategy in the play of one deal at the bridge table varies along with variation in declarer's objective; the opponents' information, skill, and objective; the contract and vulnerability; and the lie of the cards in four hands, which includes four suit combinations and their arrangement. In bridge exposition it is routine to suppose two partnerships with opposite objectives that incorporate the conditions of contest (scoring variant and tournament variant) and the contract and vulnerability. In terms of game theory, then, the play of any deal is a zero-sum game.

At least since Crowhurst (1964), the analysis of suit combinations routinely makes further simplifications along the same lines. Most fundamental, the play of any suit combination is a zero-sum game. In effect, the two sides agree on the relation of the suit to the entire hand so that their opposite entire objectives reduce to opposite objectives in the suit. (The double-dummy nature of the defense, below, makes this an important unexplored objective.*) The bottom line is that their opposite objectives can be expressed in terms of the number of tricks won and lost in the featured suit.

It is common to go two steps further with Crowhurst. First, a suit combination is a two-person zero-sum game. That means the two defenders play as one; they are of one mind. They know each other's cards and thereby, knowing the dummy, they know declarer's hand too. (That particular is properly called double-dummy defense.) One plan governs both their plays. If they choose to randomize their plays (see "Mixed strategy" below), they are able to randomize together.

Second, play of a suit combination amounts to a sequence of tricks with the lead always from dummy or from the closed hand at declarer's option. In effect, the defenders always switch to a side suit when they win a trick, and declarer stops those side suits at least before discarding from the featured suit. Declarer is able to cross between hands using side suits; i.e. communication or entry management is no problem.

=== Upside down? ===
One other convention is to put the greater number of cards in dummy, North, if the suit combination comprises two unequal holdings. Given the simplified setting, that makes no difference except for occasional psychological considerations, Crowhurst says. At the table, against two defenders who do see the open hand and don't see the closed hand, the difference may be very important.

=== Limited scope of conventional objectives ===
Crowhurst generally covers two alternative objective functions, (maximum) expected number of tricks won, or tricks expectation, and (maximum) probability of winning a salient specific number of tricks such as three for a combination with four cards in each hand.

♥Q J 9 x

♥A x x x

That set of two objectives is limited in some ways that are practically important, so they may have a big impact on the application of any findings to "real deals". It turns out that the findings are not simply applicable to trump contracts or to notrump contracts; nor generally applicable to a trump suit or a side suit in a trump contract. The crux of the matter is that the number of winning tricks in a suit is too simple. The number of losing tricks is not redundant and the sequence of winning and losing tricks may be significant.

First, consider the given suit combination in a heart contract. If the suit splits 0=5, or ♥– at left and ♥K10876 at right, then the defense has a fifth-round winner in hearts, which cannot be avoided. (The fifth trick in a suit may never be played, but the fifth card in trumps is a winner if played on a side-suit trick.) In a four-card suit combination such as this one, "three winners" usually means "one loser" but that is not redundant, and the distinction between three with one loser and three with two losers may be vital to the objectives of the two sides on a real deal.

Second, consider the given suit combination in a spade contract. Three winners on the first three hearts and a loser on the fourth trick — say, T876 opposite singleton king, and dummy leads the queen — leave open the possibility of losing no heart tricks, if the fourth one can be discarded or trumped. Three winners on the first, third, and fourth heart tricks — say, 87 opposite KT6, and declarer leads the ace — imply a loser on the second trick which cannot be avoided (or only rarely). The number of winning tricks for the declaring side, out of four cards in the suit, only approximately matches the objectives of the two sides on a real deal.

== Deriving optimum suit plays ==
Within the simplified setting, declarer's optimal play of a suit combination may be derived using well-established game theory, namely the theory of two-person zero-sum games. Crowhurst generally covers two alternative objective functions for every suit combination in the catalog. One is the (maximum) expected number of tricks won, or tricks expectation. Another is the (maximum) probability of winning a salient specific number of tricks such as three for a combination with four cards in each hand.

This means that an objective function to be maximised is specified. For suit play purposes, this objective function (or goal) is usually taken to be the likelihood of making a specified minimum number of tricks.

Given this objective, all lines of play are checked against all possible defenses for each distribution of opponent's cards, and the objective function is determined for each of these cases. Each line of play combined with each distribution of opponent's cards can then be assigned a minimum value of the objective function resulting from the best defense for that layout. The optimum line of play is selected as the line that maximises the minimum value of the objective function averaged over all possible layouts. As a result, the optimum solution to the suit combination takes into account all lines of defense (including all forms of falsecarding), and guards against the best lines of defense, but is not necessarily optimal in terms of exploiting errors made by the defense.

== Examples ==
Two tricks are required from the following combination:

♥ A 10 4

♥ Q 3 2

The optimal approach is to lead low toward the queen, a finesse against the king. If the queen loses to the king, lead low toward the ten, a second-round finesse against the jack. This wins two tricks 74% of the time. The approximation is easy to see by considering the four possible lies of the king and the jack in the defending hands. You succeed in three of the four cases: both king and jack in East (24% chance), king alone in East (26% chance), and neither in East (24% chance). In the fourth case, king in west and jack in East (26%), you succeed if the jack is singleton (0.5% chance).

Suppose two tricks are required from the next combination:

♥ J 10 5 4 3

♥ A 2

The optimal approach is to cash the ace and then lead low toward the jack. That fails only against ♥KQxxx(xx) in east; that is the king, queen, and at least three of the five small hearts. In other words, it succeeds if West holds either honor or at least three spot cards. Overall the probability of success is 90.0%.

If three tricks are required, Lawrence recommends a different line of play. Cash the ace and then duck the second trick; that is, play low from both hands regardless of the defense. This succeeds when the suit is distributed 3-3 between the opponents and also when it splits 4–2 with one or both honors doubleton. (Against both honors doubleton, it wins four tricks. Against one honor doubleton it loses the second trick to that honor and the third trick to the other, winning the other three tricks.) Overall the probability of success is 64.6%.

== Exploiting defensive errors ==
The optimum treatment of a particular suit combination guarantees a certain minimum likelihood of success against any possible defense. However, such a treatment, whilst guarding against opponents who would exploit any error in declarer play, does not itself exploit defensive errors. In some practical cases when defensive errors are likely, it might be advisable to deviate from the optimum play of the suit so as to benefit from the assumed defensive errors.

♥ K Q 10

♥ 4 3 2

In this example, from 5th edition of the Official Encyclopedia of Bridge, declarer needs two tricks from a suit in which he has three small spotcards and dummy has K Q 10:

The game-theoretical optimum approach is to lead towards the king in dummy, and subsequently - whether the king won or not - to lead to the queen.

An expert defender sitting East with the ace, but no jack, is likely to duck on the first round to protect partner's jack. Thus, if this expert defender plays the ace on the first trick, he is most likely to have either the ace singleton, or the ace and jack because with any other combination he would have ducked. In the latter case, declarer's only chance to get two tricks from this suit is to play East for ace-jack doubleton. As the chance for ace-jack doubleton (0.73%) is larger than the chance for ace singleton (0.48%), if the king loses to the ace in trick one, declarer's optimum play is to play for the drop of the jack in trick two and put up the queen.

In practice however, if in the first round the king loses to East's ace, declarer must decide whether East would hold up the ace in the first round when not holding the jack. If East is judged as likely to play the ace in the first round regardless of the holding of the jack, declarer should finesse the ten in the second round. Note that an expert sitting East who deliberately makes the exploitative defense of catching the king with the ace whilst holding one or more small cards in the suit (but not the jack), is counting on the fact that declarer would judge him not to make that suboptimal play.

== Improved computer analysis ==
Although optimum plays for suit combinations were traditionally derived by hand, the computational capabilities of modern computers has enabled greater detail and accuracy in the analysis and presentation of optimal lines of play. In reference to Roudinesco's Dictionary of Suit Combinations, bibliographers Bourke and Sugden note that it "has been superseded by computer programs, such as SuitPlay" - a program developed by Jeroen Warmerdam of the Netherlands.

Even without psychological factors, the analysis of complex suit combinations is not straightforward. Human analysis can lead to oversight of certain possibilities. Supposedly optimum approaches to suit combinations were published in the Official Encyclopedia of Bridge, 5th edition, but automated analysis later demonstrated some to be incorrect and these were updated in later editions.

Example

♥ A 10 4 2

♥ 9 5 3

Two tricks are required from this suit combination. The line of play claimed by the 5th edition of The Official Encyclopedia of Bridge to guarantee 51% success is: "Lead small to the nine. If this loses to West, finesse the ten next. If an honor appears from East on the first round, lead small to the nine again; if East shows out or plays another honor, finesse the ten next; otherwise play to the ace."

However, using computerised exhaustive searches of his own design, Warmerdam found a play that he claims leads to at least 58% success against any possible defense: "Lead small to the nine. If this loses to West, cash the ace. If an honor appears from East on the first round, run the 9 and if it loses finesse the ten." The 6th edition of The Official Encyclopedia of Bridge recommends the same line of play as Warmerdam but states that the chance of success is 51%; the 7th edition corrected the percentage to 58%.

== Goal setting ==
Although there can be little debate on what is the game-theoretically optimum play of a suit given the suit lay-out and the objective function to be maximised, the choice of what constitutes the right objective function for a given practical situation can be subject of debate. Generally, the specification of the objective function depends on the type of scoring. In team matches with IMP scoring, the objective of maximising the imp score usually corresponds to the goal of maximising the likelihood of obtaining a specified number of tricks from the suit under consideration (see above examples). In matchpoint scoring, one usually assumes that the objective of maximising your matchpoint score corresponds to the goal of maximising the expected number of tricks from the suit under consideration. This assumption is not always correct. The goal for declarer in matchpoint scoring rather is to ensure that his line of play beats alternative approaches in term of scoring more tricks on as many lay-outs as possible. When applying this 'matchpoint objective' to the line of play for a single suit, optimum lines of play originate that may differ from the non-exploitative line of play that optimises the expected number of tricks from the suit. An example illustrates the point:

♥ K 10 8 4

♥ Q 3 2

What is the best matchpoint play? The line of play that maximises the expected number of tricks from this suit is to finesse by playing to the ten. If the ten loses to the jack, you next play towards the king. If the ten loses to the ace, you next play the queen. This approach results in three tricks in 28.7% of the cases, two tricks in 54.4% of the cases, and one trick in 16.9% of the cases. The expectation value for the number of tricks is therefore 2.12 tricks.

However, this play is not optimal in the sense of optimising the above described matchpoint objective. Consider the line of play that starts by taking a deep finesse by playing to the eight. If the eight loses to the nine, next play to the king. If the eight loses to the jack, next let the ten run. If the eight loses to the ace, let the queen run and then finesse over the jack. This play results in 2.09 expected tricks, a results slightly less than the above 2.12 tricks obtained by playing to the ten. Yet, the play that leads to 2.09 tricks on average, beats the play leading to an average of 2.12 tricks in terms of matchpoint objective.

This can be seen by considering the lay-outs on which the line of play that starts with a deep finesse takes more tricks than the line of play starting with a finesse and vice versa: it follows that the deep finesse beats the finesse in 22.95% of the cases, while the finesse beats the deep finesse only in 18.33% of the cases. In the remainder of the cases (58.72%) both lines of play lead to the same number of tricks.

== Mixed strategies ==
Further complications can arise as in some cases no single deterministic strategy leads to an optimal result. A well-known result in game theory states that in such cases an optimal mixed strategy must exist. A small change in the lay-out of the last example illustrates this:

♥ K 10 8 7

♥ Q 3 2

What is the best matchpoint play for this suit? The line of play that maximises the expected number of tricks is to finesse by playing to the ten. If the ten loses to the jack, you next play towards the king. If the ten loses to the ace, you next play the queen.

Again, this play is not optimal in terms of matchpoint objective, as it gets beaten by the following line of play: take a deep finesse by playing to the eight. If the eight loses to the nine, next play the ten and finesse the jack. If the eight loses to the jack, next let the ten run. If the eight loses to the ace, let the queen run and then finesse over the jack. A similar analysis as in the previous example shows that the line of play that starts with a deep finesse in 31.43% of the cases leads to more tricks than the line of play starting with a finesse. The reverse result holds only in 23.18% of the cases.

The above line of play starting with the deep finesse also fails to optimise the matchpoint objective as it gets beaten by another line of play. In turns out that there are a total of eight lines of play that are non-transitive: the eight lines of play can be thought to be placed on a circle such that each line of play beats its left neighbor. As a result, the optimal approach in the context of the matchpoint objective corresponds to a so-called mixed strategy and is probabilistic in nature: the declarer has to select randomly one of the eight lines of play.

== See also ==
- Bridge probabilities
- Finesse
- Principle of restricted choice
- Safety play
- Vacant Places
- Bridge Hands: Suit Combinations
- Bridge CCAnalyser
