= Samuel Fisher (Quaker) =

English Quaker controversialist

Samuel Fisher (1605–1665) was an English Quaker controversialist.

== Early life ==
Fisher was the son of John Fisher, a hatter in Northampton, where Fisher was born. After attending a local school he matriculated at Trinity College, Oxford, in 1623 and graduated B.A. in 1627. Of Puritan views, he moved to New Inn Hall, where he proceeded M.A. in 1630. Gerard Croese states that he was chaplain to a nobleman for a short time, and became a confirmed Puritan.

In 1632 he was presented to the lectureship of Lydd, Kent. He was known as a powerful preacher, and became a leader among the Puritans of the district. In his 'Baby-Baptism', Fisher states that he was later given a presbyterian ordination. While at Lydd Fisher associated with some Anabaptists, attending their meetings and offering them the use of his pulpit, in which he was stopped by the churchwardens.

About 1643 he returned his licence to the bishop and joined the Baptists, supporting himself by farming. He was rebaptised, and after taking an active part in the Baptist community became minister to a congregation at Ashford, Kent, by 1649, in which year he engaged in controversy on infant baptism with several ministers in the presence of over two thousand people. He also disputed with Francis Cheynell at Petworth, Sussex, in 1651, and was engaged in at least eight other disputes within three years. He wrote Tracts in defence of his principles, and Baby-Baptism meer Babism.

== Quaker convert ==
In 1654 William Coton and John Stubbs, while on a visit to Lydd, stayed at Fisher's house, and convinced him of the truth of quakerism. Shortly afterwards he joined the Society of Friends, among whom he became a minister, probably before his meeting with George Fox at Romney in 1655. On 17 September 1656 Fisher attended the meeting of Parliament, and when Oliver Cromwell stated that to his knowledge no man in England had suffered imprisonment unjustly, he attempted a reply. He was prevented from completing his speech, which he afterwards published. He subsequently attempted to address the Members of Parliament at a fast-day service in St. Margaret's Church, Westminster. He was active in Kent, where according to Joseph Besse he was roughly handled in 1658, and in 1659 he was pulled out of a meeting at Westminster by his hair and beaten.

In May 1659 he went to Dunkirk with Edward Burrough; when the authorities ordered them to leave the town, they declined, and were then directed to be moderate. After unsuccessful encounters with the monks and nuns for a few days they returned to England. During the following year Fisher and Stubbs made a journey to Rome, travelling over the Alps on foot, where they testified to several of the cardinals, and distributed copies of Quaker literature. They apparently were not molested or warned. Anthony Wood states that when Fisher returned, he was well dressed; suspected of being a Jesuit and in receipt of a pension from the Pope, he was imprisoned and he seems to have undergone some further persecution.

== Later life ==
In 1660 Fisher held a dispute with Thomas Danson at Sandwich, Kent, and later that year was in Newgate Prison. The rest of his life was mainly spent around London, where he was a successful preacher. In 1661 he was imprisoned and treated badly in the Gatehouse Prison, Westminster. In 1662 he was arrested and sent to Bridewell Prison for being present at an illegal meeting. He was again sent to Newgate for refusing to take oaths, and was detained for upwards of a year, during which time he occupied himself in writing 'The Bishop busied beside the Business.' During part of this imprisonment he was confined with other prisoners in a room so small that they were unable to lie down at the same time.

Shortly after his discharge he was again arrested at Charlwood, Surrey, and committed to the White Lion Prison, Southwark, where he was confined for about two years. During the Great Plague of London he was temporarily released, and went to the house of Ann Travers, a Quaker at Dalston, near London, where he died of the plague on 31 August 1665. Fisher's works were Quaker text-books for more than a century. William Sewel called him 'dextrous and well skilled in the ancient poets and Hebrew'; and William Penn, a close associate, praised his even temper and humility.

== Works ==
Fisher used an "alliterative popular style" which "has something of Rabelais and something of Martin Marprelate in it".

Fisher's Rusticus ad Academicos in Exercitationibus Expostulatoriis, Apologeticis Quatuor. The Rusticks Alarm to the Rabbies, or the Country correcting the University and Clergy (1660) is, according to Christopher Hill, "a remarkable work of popular Biblical criticism, based on real scholarship", in which Fisher "virtually abandoned any hope of unity of interpretation, and so of any external unity [of the church]."

Fisher's works include:

- Baby-Baptism meer Babism, or an Answer to Nobody in Five Words, to Everybody who finds himself concerned in it. (1) Anti-Diabolism, or a True Account of a Dispute at Ashford proved a True Counterfeit; (2) Anti-Babism, or the Babish Disputings of the Priests for Baby-Baptism Disproved; (3) Anti-Rantism, or Christ'ndome Unchrist'nd; (4) Anti-Ranterism, or Christ'ndome New Christ'nd; (5) Anti-Sacerdotism the deep dotage of the D.D. Divines Discovered, or the Antichristian C.C. Clergy cleared to be that themselves which they have ever charged Christ's Clergy to be, 1653.
- Christianismus Redivivus, Christ'ndom both unchrist'ned and new-christ'ned, 1655.
- The Scorned Quaker's True and Honest Account, both why and what he should have spoken (as to the sum and substance thereof) by commission from God, but that he had not permission from Men, 1656.
- The Burden of the Word of the Lord, as it was declared in part, and as it lay upon me from the Lord on the 19th day of the 4th mo. 1656, to declare it more fully, 1656.
- Rusticus ad Academicos in Exercitationibus Expostulatoriis, Apologeticis Quatuor. The Rusticks Alarm to the Rabbies, or the Country correcting the University and Clergy, 1660.
- An Additional Appendix to the book entitled "Rusticus ad Academicos" 1660.
- Lux Christi emergens, oriens, effulgens, ac seipsam expandens per universum, 1660.
- One Antidote more against that provoking Sin of Swearing, 1661.
- Ἀπόκρυπτα ἀποκάλυπτα, Velata Quædam Revelata, 1661.
- Ἐπίσκοπος ἀπόσκοπος; the Bishop Busied beside the Businesse, 1662.

These works, with others, were reprinted in 1679 under the title of The Testimony of Truth Exalted, folio.
