= Principle of restricted choice =

Guideline in card games

The principle of restricted choice is a guideline used in card games such as contract bridge to intuit hidden information. It may be stated as "The play of a card which may have been selected as a choice of equal plays increases the chance that the player started with a holding in which his choice was restricted." Crucially, it helps play "in situations which used to be thought of as guesswork."

For example, South leads a low spade, West plays a low one, North plays the queen, East wins with the king. The ace and king are equivalent cards; East's play of the king decreases the probability East holds the ace – and increases the probability West holds the ace. The principle helps other players infer the locations of unobserved equivalent cards such as that spade ace after observing the king. The increase or decrease in probability is an example of Bayesian updating as evidence accumulates and particular applications of restricted choice are similar to the Monty Hall problem.

In many of those situations the rule derived from the principle is to play for split honors. After observing one equivalent card, that is, one should continue play as if two equivalents were split between the opposing players, so that there was no choice about which one to play. Whoever played the first one doesn't have the other one.

When the number of equivalent cards is greater than two, the principle is complicated because their equivalence may not be manifest. When one partner holds ♣Q and ♣10, say, and the other holds ♣J, it is usually true that those three cards are equivalent but the one who holds two of them does not know it. Restricted choice is always introduced in terms of two touching cards – consecutive ranks in the same suit, such as ♥QJ or ♦KQ – where equivalence is manifest.

If there is no reason to prefer a specific card (for example to signal to partner), a player holding two or more equivalent cards should sometimes randomize their order of play (see the note on Nash equilibrium). The probability calculations in coverage of restricted choice often take uniform randomization for granted but that is problematic.

The principle of restricted choice even applies to an opponent's choice of an opening lead from equivalent suits. See Kelsey & Glauert (1980).

== Example ==
♠ A J 10 9 6

♠ 8 7 5 4

Table 1 Possible West and East Holdings of KQ32
2-2 Split		3-1 Split		4-0 Split	
West	East	West	East	West	East
KQ	32	KQ3	2	KQ32	—
K3	Q2	KQ2	3	—	KQ32
K2	Q3	K32	Q		
Q3	K2	**Q32**	**K**		
Q2	K3	K	Q32		
**32**	**KQ**	Q	K32		
		3	KQ2		
		2	KQ3		

Consider the suit combination represented at left. There are four spade cards ♠8754 in the South (closed hand) and five ♠AJ1096 in the North (dummy, visible to all players). West and East hold the remaining four spades ♠KQ32 in their two closed hands.

Prior to play, 16 different West and East spade holdings or "lies" are possible from the perspective of South. These are listed in Table 1, ordered first by "split" from equal to unequal numbers of cards, then by West's holding from strongest to weakest.

South leads a small spade, West plays the ♠2 (or ♠3), dummy North plays the ♠J, and East wins with the ♠K. Later, after winning a side-suit trick, South leads another small spade and West follows low with the ♠3 (or ♠2). At this point, with North and East yet to play, the location of only the ♠Q has not been established. South is at a decision point and knows that only two of the original 16 lies remain possible (bolded in Table 1), for West has played both low cards and East the king. At first glance, it may seem that the odds are now even, 1:1, so that South should expect to do equally well with either of the two possible continuations. However, the principle of restricted choice tells us that while both lies of the cards are possible, the probabilities are 2:1 in favour of assuming West holds Q32 and to therefore play the ten.

If East had ♠KQ, he could equally well have played the queen instead of the king. Thus some deals with original lie 32 and KQ would not reach this stage; some would instead reach the parallel stage with ♠K alone missing, South having observed 32 and Q. In contrast, every deal with original lie Q32 and K would reach this stage, for East played the king perforce (without choice, or by "restricted choice").

If East would win the first trick with the king or queen uniformly at random from ♠KQ, then that original lie 32 and KQ would reach this stage half the time and would take the other fork in the road half the time. Thus on the actual sequence of play, the odds are not even but one-half to one, or 1:2. East would retain queen from original ♠KQ about one-third of the time and retain no spades from original ♠K about two-thirds of the time. The principle of restricted choice posits that to finesse by playing the ♠10 is nearly twice as likely to succeed.

Importantly, this assumes that the defenders have no signaling system, so that the play by west of (say) the 3 followed by the 2 does not signal a doubleton. During the course of many equivalent deals, East with ♠KQ should in theory win the first trick with the king or queen uniformly at random; that is, half each without any pattern.

=== Further accuracy ===
A priori, four outstanding cards "split" as shown in the first two columns of Table 2 below. For example, three cards are together and the fourth is alone, a "3-1 split" with probability 49.74%. To understand the "number of specific lies" refer to the preceding list of all lies in Table 1.

Table 2 Split Probabilities of Four Cards
Split	Probability of Split	Number of specific lies	Probability of a specific lie
2-2	40.70%	6	6.78%
3-1	49.74%	8	6.22%
4-0	9.57%	2	4.78%

The last column gives the a priori probability of any specific original holding such as 32 and KQ; that one is represented by row one covering the 2–2 split. The other lie featured in our example play of the spade suit, Q32 and K, is represented by row two covering the 3–1 split.

Thus the table shows that the a priori odds on these two specific lies were not even but slightly in favor of the former, about 6.78 to 6.22 for ♠KQ against ♠K.

What are the odds a posteriori, at the moment of truth in our example play of the spade suit? If East does with ♠KQ win the first trick uniformly at random with the king or the queen – and with ♠K win the first trick with the king, having no choice – the posterior odds are 3.39 to 6.22, a little more than 1:2, in percentage terms a little more than 35% for ♠KQ. To play the ace ♠A from North on the second round should win about 35% while to finesse again with the ten ♠10 wins about 65%.

The principle of restricted choice is general but this specific probability calculation does suppose East would win with the king from ♠KQ precisely half the time (which is best). If East would win with the king from ♠KQ more or less than half the time, then South wins more or less than 35% by playing the ace. Indeed, if East would win with the king 92% of the time (=6.22/6.78), then South wins 50% by playing the ace and 50% by repeating the finesse. If that is true, however, South wins almost 100% by repeating the finesse after East wins with the queen – for the queen from that East player almost denies the king.

== Mathematical theory ==
The principle of restricted choice is an application of Bayes' theorem on conditional probability. In the following: Kp represents the condition that the King is played by East in the first trick; KQ represents the condition that East holds KQ and; K represents the condition that East holds K.

The two conditions are as follows:

$$\begin{align}
P(KQ \mid Kp) &= \frac{P(Kp\mid KQ) P(KQ)}{P(Kp)}\\
P(K \mid Kp) &= \frac{P(Kp\mid K) P(K)}{P(Kp)}\\
\end{align}$$

We assume that when East holds KQ, he plays each 50% of the time and when he holds the K alone, he must play the K. This is represented by the following:

$$\begin{align}
P(Kp\mid KQ) &= 0.5\\
P(Kp\mid K) &= 1\\
\end{align}$$

Further, based on the play to trick 1, only two of the original 16 (i.e., a priori) possible holdings shown in Table 1 above remain available for East, each equally possible.

$$\begin{align}
P(K) \approx P(KQ)\\
\end{align}$$

Solving, we find (posteriori) that...

$$\begin{align}
\ P(K \mid Kp) \approx 2* P(KQ \mid Kp)
\end{align}$$

In conclusion, we can say that "after East has played the K on the first round, the probability that East started with the singleton K is twice as probable as that he started with the KQ."

The first two equations are Bayes' theorem, the rest is simple algebra.

Increases and decreases in the probabilities of original lies of the opposing cards, as the play of the hand proceeds, are examples of Bayesian updating as evidence accumulates.

== See also ==
- Monty Hall problem
