= Constructive dilemma =

Rule of inference of propositional logic

- Type: Rule of inference
- Field: Propositional calculus
- Statement: If $P$ implies $Q$ and $R$ implies $S$, and either $P$ or $R$ is true, then either $Q$ or $S$ has to be true.
- Symbolic statement: $\frac{(P \to Q), (R \to S), P \lor R}{\therefore Q \lor S}$

Constructive dilemma is a valid rule of inference of propositional logic. It is the inference that, if P implies Q and R implies S and either P or R is true, then either Q or S has to be true. In sum, if two conditionals are true and at least one of their antecedents is, then at least one of their consequents must be too. Constructive dilemma is the disjunctive version of modus ponens, whereas destructive dilemma is the disjunctive version of modus tollens. The constructive dilemma rule can be stated:

$$\frac{(P \to Q), (R \to S), P \lor R}{\therefore Q \lor S}$$

where the rule is that whenever instances of "$P \to Q$", "$R \to S$", and "$P \lor R$" appear on lines of a proof, "$Q \lor S$" can be placed on a subsequent line.

== Formal notation ==
The constructive dilemma rule may be written in sequent notation:

$$(P \to Q), (R \to S), (P \lor R) \vdash (Q \lor S)$$

where $\vdash$ is a metalogical symbol meaning that $Q \lor S$ is a syntactic consequence of $P \to Q$, $R \to S$, and $P \lor R$ in some logical system;

and expressed as a truth-functional tautology or theorem of propositional logic:

$$(((P \to Q) \land (R \to S)) \land (P \lor R)) \to (Q \lor S)$$

where $P$, $Q$, $R$ and $S$ are propositions expressed in some formal system.

== Natural language example ==
1. If I win a million dollars, I will donate it to an orphanage.
2. If my friend wins a million dollars, he will donate it to a wildlife fund.
3. Either I win a million dollars, or my friend wins a million dollars, or both.
4. Therefore, either an orphanage will get a million dollars, or a wildlife fund will get a million dollars, or both.

The dilemma derives its name because of the transfer of disjunctive operator.
