= Trump promotion =

Technique in contract bridge

Trump promotion is a technique in contract bridge where the defenders create an otherwise non-existing trump trick for themselves. The most common type of trump promotion occurs when one defender plays a side suit through, in which both the declarer's hand and the other defender are void:

		♠	6		
		♥	K Q J		
		♦	5		
		♣	—		
♠	J 7	N W E S		♠	4
♥	5 3	N W E S		♥	2
♦	—	N W E S		♦	7 3
♣	4	N W E S		♣	8
East to lead		♠	K Q 5		
East to lead		♥	6		
East to lead		♦	—		
East to lead		♣	Q		

Spades are trump. If the declarer were on lead, he could draw trumps and claim the rest of tricks; however, with East on lead, when he leads a diamond, declarer has two unfavorable choices: if he ruffs low, he will get overruffed by West. If he ruffs high (with an honor), the West's spade jack will become a trick.

In general, it is not required that the defense leads to the trick; often, the "killing suit" can be led by the declarer (because of an error or because he doesn't have anything else to lead).

Sometimes, a defender can get a trump promotion by refusing to overruff:

♠	A Q J 9	Spades trump W leads hearts	
♥	—	Spades trump W leads hearts	
♦	—	Spades trump W leads hearts	
♣	K	Spades trump W leads hearts	
N E		♠	K 10 4
N E		♥	—
N E		♦	8
N E		♣	4

Spades are trump, and hearts are led by South or West; knowing that East is void, declarer must ruff high (with the queen or jack). If East hastily overruffs with the king, that will be the last trick for the defense. (The A and Q will take care of his now-doubleton T) However, if he discards a minor suit card, he will suddenly come into possession of two trump tricks—the king (which he was always entitled to) but also the ten - he can play low on the ace, take the queen with the king, and still have the ten.

When the same motive is used by the declarer, it is referred to as Coup en passant.

== See also ==
- Uppercut (bridge)
- Coup en passant
