= Card reading (bridge) =

Inferring which remaining cards are held by each opponent

In contract bridge, card reading (or counting the hand) is the process of inferring which remaining cards are held by each opponent. The reading is based on information gained in the bidding and the play to previous tricks. The technique is used by the declarer and defenders primarily to determine the probable suit distribution and honor card holdings of each unseen hand; determination of the location of specific spot-cards may be critical as well. Card reading is based on the fact that there are thirteen cards in each of four suits and thirteen cards in each of four hands.

== General tips ==
=== Basic ===
There are some basic tips:

- The player could memorize the common patterns of the 13 cards, in a suit, as held by the four players: 4432, 4333, 4441, 5332, 5431, 5422, 6322, 6331, etc. If a player discovers that each opponent has three cards in a suit, and the player holds two cards, then no arithmetic is needed to know that the partner holds the remaining five cards of the suit, because the "5332" pattern will come to mind.
- Concentration on the distribution of the unseen cards is considered an important aspect of card counting and, after this skill is mastered, the counter is then able to recognize common patterns. That is, the counter can then start thinking not just about the number of outstanding cards in a suit, but also about how the cards might "break" (the section below, "Counting trumps" provides an example).
- It is recommended that a single unseen hand is observed first, with the most straightforward hand belonging to:
  - the player who made the most bids during the auction
  - the player who made the opening lead
  - the player who has a long suit
- Card counting in bridge is considered a very difficult practice to learn, with speedier progress possible through concentration upon one or two suits for every deal played, regardless of the potential influence of the respective hand; through this process, the brain becomes adept at remembering cards.

=== Advanced ===
The advanced tips include:

- Memorize the original layout. Whether declaring or defending, the player can study the dummy hand at trick one and create a mental picture of its distribution. Commit it to memory by repeating the pattern in the mind (for example: 3-5-3-2, or 35-32). Players can do the same with their own hands. Later in the play, if unable to remember how many cards have been played in a suit, the player could reconstruct the play – and figure out how many times the suit has been led – by recalling a mental picture of the number of cards which the player and the dummy originally held in the suit.
- The player could mentally review the bidding before playing to the first trick. If possible, the player could visualize a picture of each player's general hand pattern and high-card strength. Consider not just what the hidden hands actually bid, but also what they did not bid. When they bid, consider not just what they have, but also what they do not have.

== Counting suits ==
- Counting one suit
- Counting two suits
- Counting four suits

=== Counting trumps ===
As a declarer, an efficient way of counting the trump cards is: instead of counting the number of trump rounds and cards trumped in, count the number of trumps in the opponents' hands. Once the dummy hand appears, calculate the number of trumps which the opponents have, then reduce this number mentally as they are played from the opponents' hands. This means keeping track of one small number, and your own trumps do not enter the calculation.

An even better way of counting trumps is to get familiar with common distribution patterns. For example, 5-3 and 4-4 are among the most common trump distributions on the declarer and dummy's hands. In cases, if an opponent shows out on the second trump round, then 5-3-1 or 4-4-1 is known, and the pattern 5-3-4-1 or 4-4-4-1 comes up automatically, and the other defender is known to have begun with four.

- Counting as a defender
- Counting HCP and winners

== See also ==
- Signal (bridge)
- Rule of 11
