= Zar Points =

Method for evaluating contract bridge hands

Zar Points (ZP) is a statistically derived method for evaluating contract bridge hands developed by Zar Petkov. The statistical research Petkov conducted in the areas of hand evaluation and bidding is useful to bridge players, regardless of their bidding or hand evaluation system. The research showed that the Milton Work point count method, even when adjusted for distribution, is not sufficiently accurate in evaluating all hands. As a result, players often make incorrect or sub-optimal bids. Zar Points are designed to take many additional factors into consideration by assigning points to each factor based on statistical weight. While most of these factors are already implicitly taken into account by experienced players, Zar Points provides a quantitative method that allows them to be incorporated into bidding.

== Zar Points ==
Zar Points (ZP) are based on high card points, distributional points and adjustments for suit fits.

=== Zar high card points ===
Zar high card points (ZHP) are the sum of the traditional Milton Work or Charles Goren 4-3-2-1 scale and control values for the ace and king.

| | 4-3-2-1 value | Control value | ZHP |
|---|---|---|---|
| Ace | 4 | 2 | 6 |
| King | 3 | 1 | 4 |
| Queen | 2 | | 2 |
| Jack | 1 | | 1 |

=== Zar distribution points ===
Zar distribution points are the sum of the lengths of the two longest suits plus the difference between the longest suit and the shortest suit.

=== Adjustments ===
==== Trump fit re-evaluation ====
With an 8-card trump fit, add points for:

- Extra trump support with a void: for each trump over 8 when the shortest suit is a void, add 2.
- Extra trump support with a singleton: for each trump over 8 when the shortest suit is a singleton, add 1.
- For a secondary 9-card fit, add 1.
- For a secondary 10-card fit, add 2.

==== Misfit adjustment ====
For bidding systems that allow one partner to know the shape of the other's hand, an additional misfit adjustment exists. To calculate the misfit modifier, find the difference in length between spade suits in each hand. Perform a similar calculation for the other three suits and sum the differences. Call this number M4.

When the partners do not have an 8-card trump fit, the misfit modifier subtracts from the total ZP. When the partners have a trump fit longer than eight, the misfit modifier adds in place of the trump-support modifier if it is larger.

The misfit modifier (M4) can be estimated if one partner knows the difference in lengths between the two most different suits (M2). This works because M2 is almost always approximately 75 percent of M4, meaning that M4 can be estimated by increasing M2 by 1/3. Keep in mind that this estimate will slightly under-value the hand in the case of "freak" distribution (where M4 is greater than 14) because M2 is only 60 percent of M4 for such wild distribution. This only occurs 0.8 percent of the time.

==== Minor adjustments ====
To improve the accuracy of the point count, standard "judgment" adjustments can be used, such as:

- Concentration: with 15+ HCP add 1 point if all the HCP are concentrated in three suits; with 11–14 HCP add 1 point if all of the HCP are concentrated in two suits.
- Short honors: subtract one point for short suit honors like KQ or QJ
- Spade suit: With 25 Zars and the suit is spades, 1 point may be added.
- Finesse: subtract or add a point for honors in opponents' suits depending on whether they are on or off side
- Unguarded Honors: discount honors in short suits bid by opponents
- Support: add one point for each honor in partner's suit (up to two)

==== Strategic adjustments ====
Zar Points are designed with rubbers scoring in mind. When playing for matchpoints, it is desirable to bid any game or small slam that has a 50 percent chance of making. To do this, slight adjustments to the ZP required per level need to be made. The result is that intermediate values are slightly off from the 5-point scale suggested below.

- 44 ZP — 8 tricks
- 48 ZP — 9 tricks
- 52 ZP — 10 tricks
- 56 ZP — 11 tricks
- 61 ZP — 12 tricks
- 67 ZP — 13 tricks

When playing using IMPs, a game should be bid with a 38 percent chance when vulnerable, but only bid a 46 percent game when not vulnerable. This adjustment shifts the ZP required for game and slam one point down when vulnerable or not vulnerable.

== Bidding levels and Zar Point requirements ==
Once adjustments have been made, an opening hand requires 26 ZP and a responding hand needs 16 ZP; a major suit game requires 52 ZP, a small slam requires 62 ZP and a grand slam requires 67.

Bidding levels are five points apart yielding:

Two level – 42 i.e. 26 + 16
Three level – 47
Four level – 52
Five level – 57
Six level – 62
Seven level – 67

This scale does not need to be memorized. To arrive at the expected number of tricks, one need only subtract 2 ZPs and divide by 5. For example, with 52 ZPs, subtracting 2 gives 50, and dividing 50 by 5 gives 10 – the number of tricks expected to be taken.

Some players use ZP for suit bidding only. Others use them for bidding no-trump as well. Zar recommends the following scheme. Notice that not having an 8-card fit increases the ZP required for a given level by 5.

- Grand slam
  - 67+ ZP with fit or
  - 72+ ZP without fit
  - First round control in all suits
- Small slam
  - 62+ ZP with fit or
  - 67+ ZP without fit
  - First round control of at least three suits
  - Second round control for the suit with no first-round control
- Notrump game
  - All suits stopped
  - 52+ ZP and any 5-3 fit or 4-4 minor fit
  - 57+ ZP without fit
- Major suit game
  - 52+ ZP and major suit fit
- Minor suit game
  - 57+ ZP and minor suit fit
  - Does not meet notrump requirements
  - Not more than two quick tricks in any suit

== Zar Points conversion ==
The simplest way to use Zar Points (in respect of opening hands) is to divide everything by two and open, as Charles Goren taught, with 13 points. Thus we effectively use the same high card point scale devised by the Four Aces in the 1930s with A=3, K=2, Q=1, J=1/2. We then add the length of the longest suit and finally, we add half the difference in the length of the second and fourth longest suits.

The foregoing normalizes Zar Points to numbers more commonly used in Standard American bidding. Alternatively, see the section below: Obtaining the conversion.

To get the HCP equivalent discussed above, Zar points need to be scaled. To scale the values of the honors from a 13-point scale to a 10-point scale, the ZP are multiplied by 10/13 and rounded to the nearest half. This results in slightly under valuing aces and jacks but is much more accurate than the traditional count.

To scale the shape points to the traditional scale, we can subtract 8 (to set the lowest value at 0) and divide by two (to scale the highest value correctly). Algebraically, if 'a' is the length of the longest suit, 'b' the second longest, and 'd' the shortest:

$\frac{(a+b) + (a-d) - 8}{2} = (a-4) + 0.5(b-d)$

== New bidding systems ==
Petkov has proposed a core bidding method, similar to the Precision Club derivatives Symmetric Relay and MOSCITO, that makes extensive use of limit bids, relays, and the shape defining properties of Zar Points to rapidly describe a hand. Below is a summary of the basics, omitting some of the finer points and the research details supporting the decisions. To make this a full system, a partnership would need to agree on what conventions to use. Most of the ideas from other systems can carry over. Partnerships interested in using this system should familiarize themselves with the reasons behind this basic bidding pattern before selecting specific conventions.

=== Opening bids ===
Opening bids are divided into three intervals: just enough to open (26–30 Zars), one extra bidding level (31–35 Zars), and two or more extra bidding levels (36+ Zars). Because distribution can dramatically affect the playability of a hand, each of these Zar Points ranges can cover a wide number of traditional high card points. The opening level could represent between 3 and 19 HCP. The middle level could represent between 7 and 22 HCP. The maximum level could represent between 11 and 30 HCP. These ranges are inclusive. These three ranges are statistically derived: 60 percent of opening hands will fall in the lowest range, 30 percent will fall in the middle range, and 10 percent will fall in the top range.

- 1♣: 36+ Zars, any distribution or 31–35 balanced
- 1♦: 31–35 Zars, any distribution or 26–30 with a 6-card minor
- 1♥: 26–30 Zars, 4+ cards in hearts, may have 4 cards in spades
- 1♠: 26–30 Zars, 4+ cards in spades, may have 4 cards in hearts (and 5 in spades)
- 1NT: 26–30 Zars, no 6-card suit, no 4-card major, no 5-5 minors
- 2♣: 26–30 Zars, 6-card heart suit
- 2♦: 26–30 Zars, 6-card spade suit
- 2♥: 26–30 Zars, 5-card heart suit and a 6-card minor
- 2♠: 26–30 Zars, 5-card spade suit and a 6-card minor
- 2NT: 26–30 Zars, at least 5–5 in the minors
- 3♣: 26–30 Zars, 7-card club suit
- 3♦: 26–30 Zars, 7-card diamond suit
- 3♥: 26–30 Zars, 7-card heart suit
- 3♠: 26–30 Zars, 7-card spade suit
- 3NT+: 8+ card suits

=== Responding to opening bids ===
Because of the very descriptive nature of each of the opening bids, the responder is in control of the bidding unless the opener bid 1♣. Also, the responder will be able after the re-bid by the opener to estimate the misfit modifier, allowing an accurate determination of where to play the hand.

- Responses to 1♥ or 1♠
  - 1♠ response to 1♥ is one-round forcing and asks the opener to better describe his hand. It shows 4+ spades. If opener rebids the heart suit, he has exactly 5 hearts.
  - 1NT is "to play", it discourages game and denies 4 spades if in response to 1♥.
  - 2♣ is artificial and forcing; shows prospects for game; denies 4 spades if in response to 1♥.
  - Direct raise of the suit is preemptive and sign-off.
  - All other bids are "natural" and to play.
- Responses to 1NT
  - 2♣ is a game-forcing relay asking for distribution
    - 2♦ rebid is 4-3-3-3 distribution (so 18–22 HCP + Controls). Oriented towards 3NT
    - 2♥ rebid is 4-4-3-2 with 3 cards in hearts (implying 2 cards in spades and 4-4 minors).
    - 2♠ rebid is 4-4-3-2 with 3 cards in spades (implying 2 cards in hearts and 4-4 minors).
    - 2NT is distribution with 5 clubs and no singleton
    - 3♣ is distribution with 5 diamonds and no singleton
    - 3♥ is 5431 with 3 hearts (implying 1 spade)
    - 3♠ is 5431 with 3 spade (implying 1 heart)
  - 2♦ is a transfer to 2♥; Afterward:
    - a rebid of 2NT is invitational to 3NT or 4H with 5+ hearts
    - a rebid of 2♠ is invitational to 3NT and shows no relevance to either major
  - 2♥ is a transfer to 2♠; a 2NT rebid is invitational with 5+ spades
  - 2♠ is a transfer to 2NT or 3♣; 2NT by opener shows interest in game in clubs
  - 2NT is a transfer to 3♣ or 3♦; 3♣ by opener shows interest in game in diamonds
  - All level three responses are game forcing and show a 4441 distribution with a singleton in the bid suit
- Respond to 2♣ with 2♦ (a relay)
  - Rebid of 2♥ specifies uni-suit (6 hearts)
  - Rebid of 2♠ specifies 5-card spade side-suit
  - Rebid of 3♣ specifies a 5-card club side-suit
  - Rebid of 3♦ specifies a 5-card diamond side-suit
- Respond to 2♦ with 2♥ (a relay)
  - Rebid of 2♠ specifies a uni-suit (6 spades)
  - Rebid of 2NT specifies 5-card heart side-suit
  - Rebid of 3♣ specifies a 5-card club side-suit
  - Rebid of 3♦ specifies a 5-card diamond side-suit
- Other responses above 1NT
  - 2NT asks for side top honor
  - New suit is round forcing oriented toward fit and then side top honor
  - Other bids are "to play" unless partnership has agreed otherwise
- Responses to 1♣
  - 1♦ is negative (less than 16), any distribution
  - 1♥ is positive (16+), at least four cards in hearts
  - 1♠ is positive (16+), at least four cards in spades
  - 1NT 16–20, balanced hand, etc.
  - Other bids are similar to Precision Club or related systems of the partnership's choosing
- Responses to 1♦
  - 1♥ forcing, natural, asks opener to show his hand, any new suit on the next round is forcing
  - 1♠ forcing, natural, asks opener to show his hand, any new suit on the next round is forcing
  - 1NT negative, responder is ready to pass next bid of opener
  - 2♣ artificial, forcing, 21+, game prospects, no 4-card major, will support a major bid with 3 cards on next round
  - Other responses are up to the partnership
