= Goulash (bridge) =

Style of playing the card game bridge

Goulash (also Ghoulie) is a style of playing the card game of bridge, normally in friendly play such as rubber bridge, in which the cards are not thoroughly shuffled between consecutive deals. The aim is to create deals where the suits are more unevenly distributed between the players, thus creating "wild" deals in order to make the game more vivid.

Goulash dealing has variations; basically, each player sorts the cards from the previous deal by suits, and all four hands are stacked back in the deck. The deck is then cut once or twice, and cards are then dealt in groups of 4-5-4 or 5–5–3, instead of one at a time as usual. Another way of dealing is 4-3-3-3, then 3-4-3-3, 3-3-4-3 and finally 3-3-3-4. This way of dealing produces the most extreme distributions.

Some players play a goulash in rubber bridge only when the previous deal was passed out; others play full goulash rubbers. In both cases, at least a game must be bid in the goulash deal, otherwise, the partial (part score) contract is discarded and the goulash redealt.

When goulash dealing is in effect, some players adjust their bidding principles (such as in Tokyo Standard Goulash Bidding) in some or all of the following ways in order to accommodate the anticipated wildness of the deal:

- A range of options such as only five-card suits may be bid though other styles as shown by Tokyo Standard allow a lot of flexibility
- Weak balanced hands (in 12-15 high card points range) are passed rather than opened though in Tokyo Standard many alternatives are presented
- Preemptive openings are forbidden in some goulash methods though Tokyo Standard employs the powerful " Jump 8 Overcall ", a preempt measure; instead, a high-level opening bid denotes the exact number of tricks the hand possesses in some methods though not in Tokyo Standard.
- Conventions are highly reduced, as opponents will often interfere and break up the subtle information exchange.
- Doubles behind a bidder are for penalties, where they would usually be for take out.

Others use opening bids to identify aces or two-suited hands, or have other conventional meanings that aid in determining whether to bid or double in competition. With the advent of very high speed computing power, goulash simulation engines have been constructed with a new method emerging entitled " Tokyo Standard Goulash Bidding " becoming the go to mechanism for playing Goulash
