= Traveling scoreslip =

Used to record scores in the card game of duplicate bridge

A traveling scoreslip (also called a traveler) is a form used for recording the results of each deal in a duplicate bridge tournament. In these tournaments, the four hands of each deal are placed into a board so that the same deal can be played by different competitors. Each time the deal (or board) is played, the result is entered into the appropriate row of the traveling scoreslip, which is placed in a pocket in the board. At the end of the tournament, the traveling scoreslips are gathered and the tournament results calculated.

The exact format of the traveling scoreslip varies but usually has the following data fields to be completed by competitors:

- Board number
- The cards held by each seat (North, West, East and South) – to be filled in only by the first pair who plays the deal. This not always required, but it can help reconstruct the deal if it becomes corrupted through error.
- A number of rows (typically 8-16, depending on the tournament size), where data about every score are entered, each having the following columns:
  - North-South (NS) and East-West (EW) pair numbers (often the NS pair numbers are preprinted on the form)
  - Contract level and strain
  - Declarer (or 'By')
  - Number of tricks made or number of tricks down
  - Opening lead (optional)
  - Score

In addition, 2-4 more columns can be present, where tournament staff can enter the overall results for the board if done manually; otherwise, the scores are entered into a computer programmed to automatically calculate the tournament results:

- Number of matchpoints (MPs) or international match points (IMPs) awarded to each NS pair and to each EW pair, depending upon the game variant being played.

== Example ==
Below is a facsimile of a traveling scoreslip for Board 1 in a five-table matchpoint tournament using a Mitchell movement. All entries are made by competitors except the last two columns which are calculated and completed by tournament staff at the end of the session.

NS	EW	Contract	By	Made	Lead	Score		MP	
NS	EW	Contract	By	Made	Lead	NS	EW	NS	EW
1	1	4♠	N	=	♥X	420		5	3
5	4	4♠	N	-1	♦X		50	0	8
4	2	3♠	S	+1	♥K	170		2	6
3	5	4♥x	W	-3	♠A	500		8	0
2	3	4♠	N	=	♣J	420		5	3
