= Rex Bridge =

Card game

Rex Bridge (Swedish: Rexbridge) is a version of contract bridge developed in Sweden in 1959 by Sten Lundberg. It gained some followers in Scandinavia but few elsewhere.

== Features ==
Apart from its scoring system (which is slightly different on penalties but otherwise very similar), it introduced a sixth kind of bid, known as Rex (Latin for "king"). Bids in Rex come between Spades and No Trumps, and the play is equal to ordinary No Trump with the difference that Aces become the lowest cards in all suits. All other cards move one step up, and the King becomes the strongest card in each suit. (Provided the contract remains in Rex).

Example of a hand, normally suitable for a 1 notrump (1 NT) opening bid: ♠ K Q 7 ♥ K J ♦ K J 10 2 ♣ A 10 9 5
Counting 17 HCP

In Rex, the same hand is equivalent to a notrump holding of: ♠ A K 8 ♥ A Q ♦ A Q J 3 ♣ J 10 6 2.
The ♣A above is now a ♣2, all other cards has increased one step each.

The hand now counts 21 HCP (the degradation of ♣A is offset by the "promotion" of three Kings to Ace-strength) and might be worth an opening bid of 2 Rex. Naturally depending on the bidding system. And as soon as any other suit (or notrump) is likely to become the contract, the valuation of the hand is again counted according to the Contract Bridge practice.

A second major difference is the possibility to bid a level 8 and 9. This may seem awkward, as it would take 14 or more tricks to make a contract at level 8 or higher. Even if the declarer takes all 13 tricks, he will still incur a one trick penalty. However, the payment for a made grand slam can still outweigh several doubled penalties. How many depends on vulnerable or not.

Consciously bidding higher than what the cards says sometimes also occurs in normal bridge, and can at occasions stand to reason. A somewhat "classic" such situation is when a 4♥ game contract, becomes overcalled by a 4♠ contract by the opponents. If both bids are reasonable, due to wrench distribution, doubling will not be profitable. However a 5♥ bid and contract with a single (doubled or not) penalty pays the opponents a smaller score compared to letting them make a game. In Contract Bridge, 7♠ cannot be overcalled in this manner, but Rex Bridge allows impossible contracts like 8♣.

There is no clear practice in using bids in Rex in connection with conventions. For instance the Stayman convention, or the partner after an opening bid 1 NT, asks for 4 cards in the majors (♥/♠) by the 2♣ ? bid, can naturally be used also after a 1 Rex opening. Equally can Charles Gorens 4♣? question for number of Aces after a 1 NT opening be used after a 1 Rex opening, but the reply must then be telling the number of Kings instead.
