= Chicago (bridge card game) =

Bridge card game

Chicago, also known as Four-deal Bridge and Short Bridge, is a form of contract bridge and a variation of rubber bridge in which one or more sets of four deals are played and scored.

== Origins and distinctions ==
Getting its name from the Standard Club of Chicago where it originated in the early 1960s, the game is well suited to club and home play. While the auction and the play of the hand are the same as in rubber bridge, Chicago has the following unique features:

- A rubber consists of exactly four deals. If a deal is passed out, the same player deals again and the deal passed out does not count as one of the four deals.
- The duration of a set of four deals is likely to be more consistent (typically about twenty minutes) than in rubber bridge where part-score contracts, defeated contracts and three-game rubbers can extend the time of play unpredictably - an attractive feature where limited time is available.
- It enables four to seven players to participate by various methods of partnership rotation after each set of four deals.
- Vulnerability is predetermined for each deal. On the first deal, neither side is vulnerable; on the second and third deals, only the dealer's side is vulnerable; and on the fourth deal, both sides are vulnerable.
- While the basic elements of scoring are similar to rubber bridge, their method of accumulation and recording differ slightly.

== Scoring ==
Chicago Rubber Bridge Score Sheet

In modern Chicago scoring, the result of each deal is recorded on a score pad similar to that used in rubber bridge but which has an additional area, usually at the top in the form of an 'X', to indicate which player dealt each hand. Points are awarded as follows:

Contracts points: as in rubber and duplicate bridge, contract points won for each trick up to and including the level of the contract are recorded below the line.

Overtricks: points for each trick taken over the contracted number of tricks are recorded above the line.

Level bonus for game and slams: If a deal results in a game contract, slam or grand slam bid and made, level bonus points are recorded above the line and have the same values as in duplicate bridge.

Part-score accumulation and level bonus: The part-score treatment differs from that in duplicate bridge and is somewhat akin to that of rubber bridge. A part-score or -scores made previously may be combined with a part-score made in the current deal to complete a game of 100 or more contract points. The level bonus for the game so completed is determined by the vulnerability of the side that completes the game on that deal. No part-score of either side may thereafter be counted toward game. A part-score on the final deal which does not complete a game receives a level bonus of 100 points; part-scores on the first three deals are not counted toward any level bonus, though.

Doubled and redoubled contracts bid and made receive 'insult' bonuses of 50 and 100 respectively, above the line as in rubber bridge

Undertricks: penalty points for a defeated contract are recorded above the line.

Honor points are recorded above the line as in rubber bridge.

== Variants ==
=== Duplicate scoring ===
Chicago is also played with duplicate-style scoring, sometimes called "duplicate style Chicago". Each deal is scored separately. Part-scores are not carried forward to later deals; instead, a side that bids and makes a part-score receives an immediate bonus of 50 points. Honor bonuses are not scored. The fixed sequence of vulnerability is unchanged, and the result is the total score over the deals played.

=== Vulnerability on the second and third deals ===
In the original form of the game the dealer's side is vulnerable on the second and third deals. In a later variation the non-dealing side is vulnerable on those deals instead, which tends to produce more competitive bidding.
