= Rubber bridge =

Card game

Rubber bridge is a form of contract bridge played by two competing pairs using a particular method of scoring. A rubber is completed when one pair becomes first to win two games, each game presenting a score of 100 or more contract points; a new game ensues until one pair has won two games to conclude the rubber. Owing to the availability of various additional bonus and penalty points in the scoring, it is possible, though less common, to win the rubber by amassing more total points despite losing two games out of three. Rubber bridge involves a high degree of skill but there is also a fair amount of luck involved in who gets the best cards. A popular variation of rubber bridge is known as Chicago.

== Playing rubber bridge ==
Rubber bridge is played with a standard deck of 52 cards. From high to low, the cards are ranked A, K, Q, J, 10, 9, 8, 7, 6, 5, 4, 3, and 2. Suits are ranked Spades (♠), Hearts (♥), Diamonds (♦), Clubs (♣). Four players play in two partnerships, with partners sitting opposite each other. Gameplay rotates clockwise around the table.

=== Choosing partners and dealing ===
At the beginning of the rubber, cards are drawn to determine partnerships and the dealer of the first hand. A pack of cards is spread face down on the table and each player takes a card, but not from the ends. The player with the highest card deals the first hand and has choice of seat. The player with the second highest card partners with the dealer against the other two. The dealer selects a pack of cards and passes it to the player on their left to be shuffled. Dealer, who may give the cards a quick shuffle at this point, then passes it to be cut by the player on their right. They then deal one card at a time clockwise starting with the player on their left. Meanwhile, if a second pack is being used, dealer's partner shuffles it and places it on their right, ready for the next dealer. This speeds up play and maintains the dealing order because there is always a shuffled pack of cards on the dealer's left and each side deals the same pack throughout the rubber. The deal rotates clockwise after each hand until the rubber is completed.

=== Auction ===
The contract to be played is determined by an auction in which the players bid for the number of tricks they will make and the trumps or no trumps. A bid consists of the number of tricks above six one needs to make and the denomination; e.g. "1♣" is seven tricks with clubs as trumps, "3NT" is nine tricks with no trump suit. The dealer bids first. At their turn players may either: pass, bid to make a higher contract, "double" an opponent's contract (which increases the penalties for failing to make the contract or the points for making the contract) or "redouble" their side's doubled contract which doubles the points again. A player may bid again after an initial pass. The auction ends when any bid is followed by three consecutive passes. If all four players pass the hand is passed in and the deal rotates.

=== Play ===
Once the contract has been decided, the player of the winning pair who first mentioned the denomination of the contract becomes declarer. The opening lead is made by the player to the declarer's left. Declarer’s partner then lays down their hand face up on the table as dummy, with the trump suit on their right. Declarer plays both his and dummy's cards. Each player, in turn, plays a card to the trick and they must play a card of the suit led if they have one. A player who has no cards of the suit led may play any card either discarding or trumping. A trick is won by the highest card of the suit led unless trumps are played, when the highest trump wins. The winner of the trick leads to the next trick.

== Scoring ==
The main article includes a detailed description of rubber bridge scoring with examples. Essentially, each winning bid's value is scored "below the line" (e.g., 3 Spades nets 90 points below the line) and overtricks, bonuses, etc. are scored "above the line", as are points for defeating contracts. Once a pair reaches 100 points "below the line", the game ends and a new one begins, with a new line drawn underneath all previous points. The first team to win two games wins what is called the "rubber" and receives a large point bonus. Whoever has the highest point total after this bonus is assigned wins the match overall.

== Variants ==
=== Nullos ===
Nullos is a variant of rubber bridge for two players.

The dealer deals thirteen cards to each player, who then view their hand. The remaining 26 cards become the 'draw deck'.

The player who did not deal then discards any number of their cards, between zero and 13, and draw back up to 13 from the draw deck. The dealer then discards any number of cards from their hand and redraws up to 13.

Players then bid in the usual way, starting with the player who did not deal, with an additional 'nullos' bid.

A nullos bid is similar to a misère bid where the player tries to lose tricks. A winning nullos bid has no trumps.

Instead of bidding on how many tricks they will win, a player bidding nullos is stating how many tricks they will lose. For example, a bid of '1 nullos' means the player must lose at least 7 tricks, and a bid of '7 nullos' means they must lose all 13 tricks.

In the order of bidding, nullos is ranked between diamonds and hearts, so the order from lowest to highest is Clubs, Diamonds, nullos, Hearts, Spades, no trumps.

The player who did not deal leads first, and play happens in turn in the usual way, with winner of the trick leading next.

When scoring, nullos is scored at the same value as hearts and spades. For example, making a bid of '1 nullos' scores 30 points above the line.

If a player loses more tricks than they bid, they score overtricks. If they lose fewer tricks than they bid, they score undertricks. For example, a bid of '1 nullos' would score one overtrick if 8 tricks were lost or one undertrick if 6 tricks were lost.

== Tactics ==
At rubber the goal is to win the most points over a series of hands and it is important to make contracts to try to win the rubber and get the bonus. Overtricks do not matter - even less than at IMPs. Balancing over low-level contracts is not as attractive, because unless one can make contract one has little to gain and may force the opponents into a higher-scoring contract. Sacrificing can be expensive and only preserves the current state rubber as far as points below the line go and a 500-point penalty is possibly worth as much as winning the rubber.

At rubber every hand is affected by the context of the score and there are many different factors to consider and weigh. One needs to be constantly aware of not just the vulnerability but what legs (part-games) both sides have as affects the meanings of bids. Game may only require 2♥ so it is worth stretching to bid it with a weak hand but not to go higher with a strong hand unless 6♥ is a reasonable chance. Part-scores like 40 and 60 are highly worthwhile as one can make game with two of major or 1NT respectively on a later hand.

This is very different from duplicate bridge where each part-score and game are worth fixed amounts and each hand is an individual battle over points.

== Laws of rubber bridge ==
There are no universally accepted rules for rubber bridge. There are three organizations that publish laws of bridge. One copyright on the laws belongs to the American Contract Bridge League (ACBL), another copyright in the British Commonwealth belonged to the Portland Club, and the copyright in the non-English speaking European countries belongs to the English Bridge Union.. In 2014, the ACBL renamed The Laws of Contract Bridge to The Laws of Rubber Bridge. Since 1947, the ACBL has published The Laws of Duplicate Bridge and revised it every 10 years. Relevant revisions to the Laws of Duplicate Bridge are later adopted in the Laws of Rubber Bridge.

== History ==
Rubber bridge is the traditional form of contract bridge and remains the most common variant for club- or home-based social games, usually played with a fixed number of hands. It is not used for ACBL sanctioned duplicate play. It gained a lot of publicity after a celebrated match, referred to as the "Bridge Battle of the Century", was held December 1931 to January 1932 between teams led by Ely Culbertson and Sidney Lenz. A total of 150 rubbers were played, and was ultimately won by the Culbertson team by a margin of 8,980 points. The match was a success both for the game itself and the concepts of bidding as promoted by Culbertson.

== See also ==
- Goulash
