= Bridge scoring =

Scoring of contract bridge

While a deal of bridge is always played following a unique set of rules, its scoring may vary depending on the type of event the deal is played on. There are two main categories of scoring: rubber and duplicate. Rubber scoring, and its popular variant Chicago, are mostly used in social play. Duplicate scoring is focused on tournament competition and has many variations that compare and rank the relative performance of partnerships and teams playing the same deals as their competitors.

== Elements ==
The following terms and concepts, defined in the glossary of contract bridge terms, are essential to understanding bridge scoring:

- Contract
- Denomination or Strain
- Down
- Honors
- Make or Made
- Odd tricks
- Overtrick
- Slam and grand slam
- Undertricks
- Undoubled, doubled and redoubled
- vulnerable, not vulnerable and none vulnerable

The method of accumulation of contract points toward a "game" varies as well. However, in all forms of bridge a "game" is achieved when 100 contract points are reached, a "partial game" or "part-score" refers to 10 to 90 contract points, and once either side reaches a game, both sides' part-scores, while still valid to be counted as part of the final score of the entire match, are reset to 0 for the purpose of the next game or rubber bonus.

Bridge scoring consists of six to eight elements, depending on the variant. These are the scoring elements:

- If the contract is made, the score for each such deal consists of:
  - Contract points, assigned to each odd trick bid and made
  - Overtrick points, assigned for each trick taken over the contracted number of odd tricks
  - A slam bonus for a small slam or grand slam contract bid and made
  - A bonus, colloquially known as 'for the insult', is received at the end of any deal in which a doubled or redoubled contract is bid and made
- If the contract is defeated, the defenders receive:
  - Penalty points, assigned for every undertrick
- In rubber bridge only:
  - A rubber bonus is received at the end of a completed rubber by the side that is first to win two games. A rubber bonus is also awarded for some game and part-game scores at the end of an unfinished rubber
  - An honour bonus is received by any player at the end of any deal in which the player held particular honour cards. (As there is no skill in scoring for honours, players often agree to play without the honour bonuses and in some forms of the game there is no such element to scoring.)
- In four-deal bridge (Chicago) only:
  - A partial-game bonus is received at the end of the last deal for any partial game contract bid and made in the last deal
  - A game bonus is received at the end of each deal for any game-finishing contract bid and made
  - An honor bonus is received by any player at the end of any deal in which the player held particular honor cards. (As there is no skill in scoring for honors, players often agree to play without the honor bonuses.)
- In duplicate bridge only:
  - A partial-game bonus is received at the end of each deal for any partial game contract bid and made
  - A game bonus is received at the end of each deal for any game contract bid and made

=== Contract points ===
Contract points are awarded for each odd trick bid and made. Their values depend on the suit (or notrump) and whether the contract is doubled or redoubled; they are not affected by vulnerability. Tricks won beyond that necessary to fulfill the contract are referred to as overtricks and their scoring points are accounted for separately because their values are dependent upon declarer's vulnerability.

Denomination	Contract Points Per Trick		
Denomination	Undoubled	Doubled	Redoubled
Notrump: First odd trick; Subsequent tricks	40; 30	80; 60	160; 120
Major suits	30	60	120
Minor suits	20	40	80

The contract points are doubled if the contract is doubled, and quadrupled if the contract is redoubled.

=== Overtrick points ===
When declarer makes overtricks, their score value depends upon the contract denomination, declarer's vulnerability and whether or not the contract is undoubled, doubled or redoubled. In an undoubled contract each overtrick earns the same as in contract points (30 for notrump and major suit contracts, 20 for minor suit contracts); values increase significantly when the contract has been doubled or redoubled, especially when vulnerable.

Contract	Overtrick Points Per Trick	
Contract	Not Vulnerable	Vulnerable
Undoubled in: Notrump; Major suit; Minor suit	30; 30; 20	30; 30; 20
Any doubled	100	200
Any redoubled	200	400

=== Slam bonus ===
Bonuses are awarded for all slam contracts bid and made:

- a small slam, or successful contract to win 12 of 13 tricks, earns a bonus of 500 points if not vulnerable and 750 points if vulnerable;
- a grand slam, or successful contract to win all 13 tricks, earns a bonus of 1000 points if not vulnerable and 1500 points if vulnerable.

=== Doubled or redoubled bonus ===
When a doubled or redoubled contract is made, a bonus is awarded to the declaring side. It is colloquially referred to as a bonus for "insult", meaning that the opponents have insulted the pair by suggesting that the declarer will not make the contract.

- 50 points are awarded for a doubled contract made, and
- 100 points are awarded for a redoubled contract made.

In scoring notation, a doubled contract is indicated by an 'X" after the contract (e.g. a contract of four hearts doubled is indicated by 4♥ X); a redoubled contract is indicated by "XX" (e.g. 4♥ XX).

=== Penalty points ===
When a contract is defeated, penalty points are awarded to the defending side. The value of the penalty depends on the number of undertricks, whether the declaring side is vulnerable or not vulnerable and whether the contract was undoubled, doubled or redoubled.

Number of Undertricks	Points Per Undertrick					
Number of Undertricks	Not Vulnerable			Vulnerable		
Number of Undertricks	Undoubled	Doubled	Redoubled	Undoubled	Doubled	Redoubled
1st undertrick	50	100	200	100	200	400
2nd and 3rd, each	50	200	400	100	300	600
4th and each subsequent	50	300	600	100	300	600

Without a double or redouble, every undertrick has a fixed cost of 100 or 50 points. The scores for (re)doubled undertricks are such that after the first vulnerable undertrick, n vulnerable undertricks cost the same as n+1 undertricks when not vulnerable; for example, four undertricks when doubled and not vulnerable cost 800 points (100+200+200+300), the same as three undertricks when doubled and vulnerable (200+300+300).

=== Rubber bonus ===
In rubber bridge only, a bonus is awarded at the conclusion of the rubber as follows:

- for a completed rubber, the side which wins the rubber, i.e. is first to win two games, receives a rubber bonus:
  - if the opponents have won no games, i.e. they are not vulnerable, the rubber bonus is 700 points; colloquially known as a 'fast rubber'
  - if the opponents have won one game, i.e. they are vulnerable, the rubber bonus is 500 points; colloquially known as a 'slow rubber'
- for unfinished rubbers:
  - if but one side has won a game, it scores 300 points, and
  - if but one side has a part-score, it scores 100 points.

=== Honor bonus or honors ===
In rubber bridge only, a bonus is awarded for any one hand holding four or five of the honors, i.e. an ace, king, queen, jack or ten.

- 100 points are awarded for any one hand holding any four of the five trump suit honors, and
- 150 points are awarded for any one hand holding all five trump suit honors, or all four aces in a notrump contract.

Honors may be declared and scored at any time after the auction but for strategic reasons it is best to do so at the conclusion of play so as not to give the opponents information about the lay of the cards. Honors may be held by any of the four players, including dummy.

=== Game or part-game bonus ===
In duplicate bridge only, game and partial-game bonuses are awarded at the conclusion of each deal as follows:

- any partial contract, i.e. one scoring less than 100 contract points, scores a bonus of 50 points, and
- any game contract, i.e. one scoring 100 or more points, scores a game bonus of 300 if not vulnerable and 500 if vulnerable.

In four-deal bridge (Chicago) only, contract points accumulate toward a game like in rubber bridge, but game bonuses are awarded like in duplicate bridge. A separate part-score bonus is available in the fourth deal only, without accumulation.

- a partial contract bid and made in the last deal, which is not game-finishing, scores a bonus of 100 points, and
- any game contract, i.e. one scoring 100 or more points (possibly in combination of a previously accumulated part-score), scores a game bonus of 300 if not vulnerable and 500 if vulnerable when completed.

== Rubber bridge ==
For additional scoring information for the rubber bridge variant Chicago, see Chicago scoring

Rubber bridge score sheet

A rubber is a series of games. A game is won by the first team to score a 100 contract points. Two games won earns the rubber bonus. The objective is to win by scoring the most total points in the rubber. Usually the partnership to win the two games and the rubber bonus wins the rubber. However, occasionally the other pair accumulate enough penalty points to win.

=== The score sheet ===
Rubber scoring is tallied on a score sheet divided into four parts where each partnership accumulates points either above the line or below the line.

Only contract points are recorded below the line; all other points are recorded above the line. Any of the four players may be the recorder, his side being represented in the "We" column and the opponents in the "They" column. In the ensuing examples, South is the recorder (the 'We' on the score sheet).

=== Example ===
The following table summarizes the results of a rubber consisting of six deals.

Deal	Declarer	Contract	Made	Down	Contract Points	Overtrick Points	Slam Bonus	(Re)doubled Bonus	Penalty Points	Honor Bonus	Deal Total NS	Deal Total EW
1	N	2NT	3		(1×40)+(1×30)=70	1×30=30					100	
2	W	4♥	4		4×30=120							120
3	W	5♣		2					2×100=200		200	
4	S	4♠ X	5		2×(4×30)=240	1×100=100		50			390	
5	N	3♣	4		3×20=60	1×20=20					80	
6	E	6♦	6		6×20=120		750			150		1020
Rubber Bonus												500
Total											770	1640

The following panels illustrate the progression of the scoring on the score sheet.

Deal 1	Deal 2	Deal 3	Deal 4	Deal 5	Deal 6	Rubber Bonus	Total

Deal 1: South bids 2NT making 3. Only the contract points (70) are scored below the line; the overtrick points (30) are scored above the line.

Deal 2: West bids and makes 4♥. This scores 120 contract points below the line; since there are no overtricks, no points are scored above the line. The accumulation of 100 or more points below the line constitutes the end of the first game and is signified by the drawing of a horizontal line. Since no part-game or game bonus is awarded in rubber bridge, East-West do not receive an additional game bonus and North-South do not receive any part-game bonus. Furthermore, the part score of 70 by North-South is no longer available for accumulation towards a game by them; the 70 points are said to be "cut off" as signified by the drawing of the horizontal line. Having won a game, East-West are vulnerable for all subsequent deals of the rubber meaning that they are now eligible for a larger rubber bonus if they win a second game before their opponents win one and they are susceptible to increased penalties if they are defeated in a contract.

Deal 3: West bids 5♣ and goes down 2, vulnerable, undoubled. This scores 200 penalty points for North-South above the line.

Deal 4: South bids 4♠ doubled, not vulnerable and makes 5. North-South score 240 contract tricks below the line, 100 overtrick points above the line and 50 points for 'insult' above the line. Accumulating 100 or more points below the line constitutes the end of the second game, signified by the drawing of a horizontal line. Having won a game, North-South are now also vulnerable for all subsequent deals of the rubber.

Deal 5: North bids 3♣ and makes 4 scoring 60 contract points below the line and 20 overtrick points above the line.

Deal 6: East bids and makes 6♦ - a small slam holding all five top honors. This scores a game of 120 contract points and earns a slam bonus of 750 points above the line (East-West being vulnerable). 150 honor points are scored above the line for holding all five honors. Having again accumulated 100 or more points below the line, East-West win a second game; a horizontal line is drawn to end the rubber.

Rubber Bonus: At the conclusion of the rubber, a rubber bonus is awarded. In this case, East-West have won a slow rubber and receive a 500-point rubber bonus above the line.

Total: The scores for each side are totalled and East-West (the 'They' on the score sheet) win the rubber.

== Duplicate bridge ==
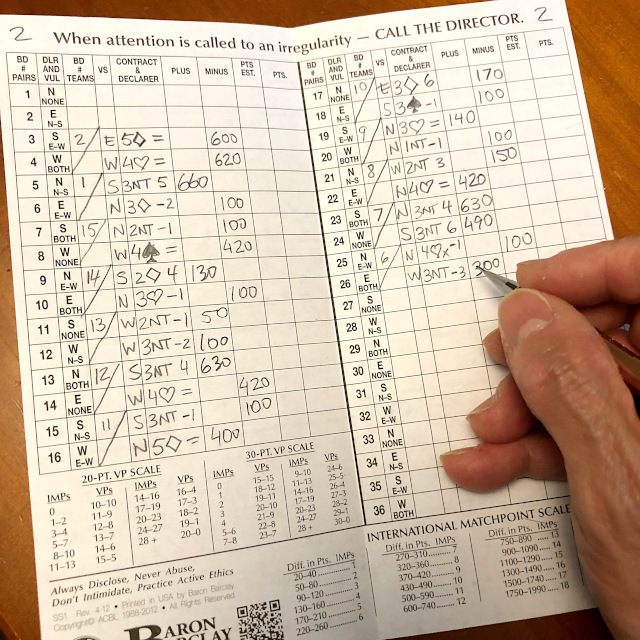
Duplicate bridge score sheet for ACBL tournament

Scoring in duplicate bridge is done in two stages:

1. Each deal is scored as in rubber bridge but with some variations in methodology.
2. The result of each deal by each partnership is compared to all other results for the same deal by all other partnerships.

=== Scoring deals ===
In duplicate scoring, the score for each deal is independent from all others and is a single number resulting from the addition of points awarded in the two cases, the contract is successful or the contract is defeated.

==== Contract is successful ====
When the contract is successful, the declaring side receives a positive score which is the sum of the following elements where applicable:

1. contract points,
2. overtrick points,
3. a part-game or game bonus,
4. a bonus for making any doubled or redoubled contract, i.e. for 'insult', and
5. a slam or grand slam bonus.

The defending side receives a negative score of the same absolute value of points the declarer received.

==== Contract is defeated ====
When the contract is defeated, the defending side receives a positive score based upon:

1. the number of tricks defeated,
2. declarer's vulnerability, and
3. whether undoubled, doubled or redoubled.

The declaring side receives a negative score of the same absolute value of the points the defense received.

==== Example ====
In duplicate bridge, the dealer position, the status of vulnerability for each side is predetermined by the board. There are 4 positions, and 4 vulnerability statuses, so 16 possible combinations. Coincidentally, the following example results is for a 16 board match for every combination of dealer position and vulnerability:

Board	Dealer	Vulnerability	Declarer	Contract	Made	Down	Contract Points	Overtrick Points	Slam Bonus	(Re)doubled Bonus	Penalty Points	Game Points	Total N-S	Total E-W
1	N	None	E	1♥	3		30	2×30=60				50	−140	140
2	E	N-S	N	4♠ X		2					(1×200)+(1×300)=500		−500	500
3	S	E-W	N	2♦	4		2×20=40	2×20=40				50	130	−130
4	W	Both	W	1NT	3		40	2×30=60				50	−150	150
5	N	N-S	S	3NT		1					100		−100	100
6	E	E-W	S	3♥	4		3×30=90	30				50	170	−170
7	S	Both	W	3♣	3		3×20=60					50	−110	110
8	W	None	E	7♥	7		7×30=210		1000			300	−1510	1510
9	N	E-W	N	4♠ X	4		2×(4×30)=240			50		300	590	−590
10	E	Both	E	2NT	2		40+30=70					50	−120	120
11	S	None	N	6♣	6		6×20=120		500			300	920	−920
12	W	N-S	E	2♦	3		2×20=40	20				50	−110	110
13	N	Both	W	4♥ X X	4		2×2×(4×30)=480			100		500	−1080	1080
14	E	None	S	5♠		1					50		−50	50
15	S	N-S	E	4♥	5		4×30=120	30				300	−450	450
16	W	E-W	N	3NT	3		40+(2×30)=100					300	400	−400

=== Matchpoints ===
One common form of pairs scoring is by matchpoints. On each board, a partnership scores two matchpoints for each other partnership that scored fewer points with the same cards, and one point for each other partnership that scored the same number of points. Thus, every board is weighted equally, with the best result earning 100 percent of the matchpoints available, and the worst earning no matchpoints; the opponents receive the complement score, e.g. an 80% score for a N–S pair implies a 20% score for their E–W opponents. Colloquially, a maximum matchpoints score on a board is known as a "top", and a zero score is a "bottom". The terms "high board" and "low board" are also used.

Note 1: Using American Contract Bridge League (ACBL) methods, scoring is one point for each pair beaten, and one-half point for each pair tied.

Note 2: The rule of two matchpoints for each pair beaten is easy to apply in practice: if the board is played n times, the top result achieves 2n−2 matchpoints, the next 2n−4, down to zero. When there are several identical results, they receive the average. However, complications occur if not every board is played the same number of times, or when an "adjusted" (director-awarded) score occurs. These cases can result in non-integer matchpoint scores – see Neuberg formula.

These matchpoints are added across all the hands that a pair plays to determine the winner. Scores are usually given as percentages of a theoretical maximum: 100% would mean that the partnership achieved the best score on every single hand. In practice, a result of 60% or 65% is likely to win the tournament or come close. In a Mitchell movement (see above) the overall scores are usually compared separately for North–South pairs and for East–West pairs, so that there is one winner in each group (unless arrow-switching has been applied - see above).

In board-a-match team game, the matchpoints are calculated using a similar principle. Since there are only two teams involved, the only possible results are 1 (won), ½ (tied), and 0 (lost) points per board.

=== International Match Points ===
In International Match Point (IMP) scoring, (Note: Both International Match Point and International Matchpoint spellings are common in bridge literature.) the difference in total points scored (or "swing") is converted to IMPs using the standard IMP table below. The purpose of the IMP table, which has sublinear dependency on differences, is to reduce results occurring from large swings.

IMP table
Point difference		IMPs	Point difference		IMPs	Point difference		IMPs
from	to	IMPs	from	to	IMPs	from	to	IMPs
0	10	0	370	420	9	1500	1740	17
20	40	1	430	490	10	1750	1990	18
50	80	2	500	590	11	2000	2240	19
90	120	3	600	740	12	2250	2490	20
130	160	4	750	890	13	2500	2990	21
170	210	5	900	1090	14	3000	3490	22
220	260	6	1100	1290	15	3500	3990	23
270	310	7	1300	1490	16	4000 or more		24
320	360	8						

The score that is being compared against can be obtained in the following ways:

- In team events, it is the score from the teammates' table
- In pair events, it can be:
  - The datum score, most often calculated as the average score on board, excluding a number of top and bottom results. Sometimes, the median score is used instead.
  - In "cross-IMP" or "Calcutta" scoring, every score on board is compared against every other score (sometimes excluding top and bottom results) and IMPs summed up (and possibly averaged, to reduce "inflation").

Example of averaged cross-IMP scoring:

Pair Making 4♠ for +620	Scores of the four other North/South pairs			
Pair Making 4♠ for +620	−100	−100	−300	+650
Point difference	720	720	920	−30
IMPs gained	12	12	14	−1
Total IMPs gained	37			
Number of competitors	4			
Average cross-IMP score	9.25			

Five North/South pairs play a board when vulnerable against non-vulnerable opponents. One pair makes a 4♠ contract, scoring +620, while the other North/South pairs score −100, −100, −300, and +650, respectively.

To determine the average cross-IMP score for the pair making 4♠, the table at right is created, entering the contract points scored by each pair.

Each of the other North/South's scores are subtracted from the +620 score and the result entered in the point-differential cells. For each point differential, the IMP look-up table is used to determine the IMPs gained. For example, the differential of 720 equates to 12 IMPs, because it falls in the range of 600 to 740 in the IMP table. Adding the IMPs gained gives a total of 37. To determine the average IMPs gained, divide the total by the number of competitors (37 divided by 4) to arrive at 9.25 as the averaged cross-IMP score.

=== Victory points ===
In some events (for example, Swiss Teams), a further normalization to reduce the effect of large swings is applied to the International Match Point scores.

A specific number of victory points (VPs), either 20 or 30, are divided between the two teams in accordance with the following scales:

20-point scale

IMP Score	0	1-2	3-4	5-7	8-10	11-13	14-16	17-19	20-23	24-27	28+
VPs	10-10	11-9	12-8	13-7	14-6	15-5	16-4	17-3	18-2	19-1	20-0

Example: A team winning by 12 IMPs would receive 15 VPs and their opponents 5.

30-point scale

IMP Score	0	1	2	3	4	5-6	7-8	9-10	11-13	14-16	17-19	20-23	24-27	28+
VPs	15-15	18-12	19-11	20-10	21-9	22-8	23-7	24-6	25-5	26-4	27-3	28-2	29-1	30-0

Example: A team winning by 12 IMPs would receive 25 VPs and their opponents 5.

== History ==
=== Notrump contracts ===
In the 1932 Laws of Contract Bridge, notrump tricks bid and made, and undoubled notrump tricks made but not bid, score 30, 40, 30, 40, 30, 40, 30.

In 1935 this became 40, 30, 30, 30, 30, 30, 30.

=== Undertricks ===
==== Until 1987 ====
Condition	Before 1935	1935-1987
Not vulnerable, not doubled	50 each	50 each
Not vulnerable, doubled	100, 150, 200, 250, 300, 350 etc.	100, 200, 200, 200, 200, 200 etc.
Vulnerable, not doubled	100, 150, 200, 250, 300, 350 etc.	100 each
Vulnerable, doubled	200, 300, 400, 500, 600, 700 etc.	200, 300, 300, 300, 300, 300 etc.

Redoubled undertricks have always scored twice as much as the same doubled undertricks.

==== After 1987 ====
A change to the scoring of the fourth and subsequent non-vulnerable undertricks, from 200 each to 300 each, was made in 1987 after a hand in the finals of the 1981 Bermuda Bowl. Munir Attaullah and Jan-e-Alam Fazli, playing for Pakistan, reached a vulnerable 7♥ contract, which would have scored them 2210. But their non-vulnerable opponent Jeff Meckstroth, playing for USA, calculated that down 11 would cost only 2100 points and thinking he might do better than that, sacrificed in 7♠ on a weak hand with five spades to the jack; this was doubled and went down nine for a score of -1700. The 510 point differential resulted in an 11 IMP swing in his team's favor.

The 1987 change in scoring increased the penalty for down nine when doubled and not vulnerable from -1700 to -2300.

Condition	After 1987 for duplicate bridge and after 1993 for rubber bridge
Not vulnerable, not doubled	50 each
Not vulnerable, doubled	100, 200, 200, 300, 300, 300 etc.
Vulnerable, not doubled	100 each
Vulnerable, doubled	200, 300, 300, 300, 300, 300 etc.

Also, the "insult bonus" in rubber bridge for making a redoubled contract used to be only 50. This was changed to 100, so that playing 5 of a minor, redoubled, making an overtrick, is always worth more than an undoubled small slam.

=== 8-level bids ===
It has always been the intention of every official set of Laws of Contract Bridge to forbid contracts for more than thirteen tricks. Some versions have stated this more clearly than others, but this intention of the Laws has never changed.

=== International Match Points ===
International Match Point scoring was first introduced at the 1938 European Championships in Oslo. Its purpose is to moderate the disproportionate effect that a very large score differential (or "swing') on just one or two boards could have on the outcome of a contest involving dozens of boards. The difference in total points scored by each team is converted to International Match Points (IMPs) using a standard table which has sublinear dependencies on differences to reduce the effect of such large swings.

Originally named European Match Points (EMPs), (Note: Referred to both as European Match Points and International Match Points in The Bridge World magazine of December 1951.) the scale provided for a maximum gain of 12 points as shown in the table below. A revised table was adopted for the 1948 European Championships in Copenhagen with a maximum of 15 points. North American players were first introduced to this scoring method at the 1951 Bermuda Bowl match in Naples, Italy.

Original EMP table 1938
Point difference		EMPs	Point difference		EMPs
from	to	EMPs	from	to	EMPs
10	30	1	400	490	7
40	60	2	500	590	8
70	100	3	600	740	9
110	180	4	750	1490	10
190	290	5	1500	1990	11
300	390	6	2000 or more		12

Revised IMP table 1948
Point difference		IMPs	Point difference		IMPs
from	to	IMPs	from	to	IMPs
0	10	0	1000	1240	8
20	40	1	1250	1490	9
70	130	2	1500	1990	10
140	210	3	2000	2490	11
220	340	4	2500	2990	12
350	490	5	3000	3490	13
500	740	6	3500	3990	14
750	990	7	4000 or more		15

Further revisions were made in 1961 and again in 1962 by the World Bridge Federation.

Revised IMP table 1961
Point difference		IMPs	Point difference		IMPs	Point difference		IMPs
from	to	IMPs	from	to	IMPs	from	to	IMPs
0	10	0	370	420	9	1350	1490	18
20	40	1	430	490	10	1500	1740	19
50	80	2	500	590	11	1750	1990	20
90	120	3	600	690	12	2000	2240	21
130	160	4	700	790	13	2250	2490	22
170	210	5	800	890	14	2500	2990	23
220	260	6	900	1040	15	3000	3490	24
270	310	7	1050	1190	16	3500 or more		25
320	360	8	1200	1340	17			

Revised IMP table effective September 1, 1962
Point difference		IMPs	Point difference		IMPs	Point difference		IMPs
from	to	IMPs	from	to	IMPs	from	to	IMPs
0	10	0	370	420	9	1750	1990	18
20	40	1	430	490	10	2000	2240	19
50	80	2	500	590	11	2250	2490	20
90	120	3	600	740	12	2500	2990	21
130	160	4	750	890	13	3000	3490	22
170	210	5	900	1090	14	3500	3990	23
220	260	6	1100	1290	15	4000 or more		24
270	310	7	1300	1490	16			
320	360	8	1500	1740	17			

== See also ==
- Contract bridge probabilities
