= Board (bridge) =

Item holding a deal of bridge

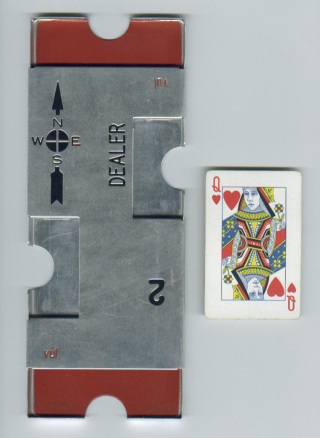
Rectangular aluminum board

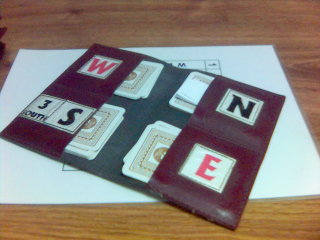
Leather or pliable plastic wallet-style board

In duplicate bridge, a board is an item of equipment that holds one deal, or one deck of 52 cards distributed in four hands of 13 cards each. The design permits the entire deal of four hands to be passed, carried or stacked securely with the cards hidden from view in four pockets. This is required for in-person duplicate bridge tournaments, where the same deal is played several times and so the composition of each hand must be preserved during and after each play of each deal. When bridge is played online, the functions of the physical boards are replaced by the software.

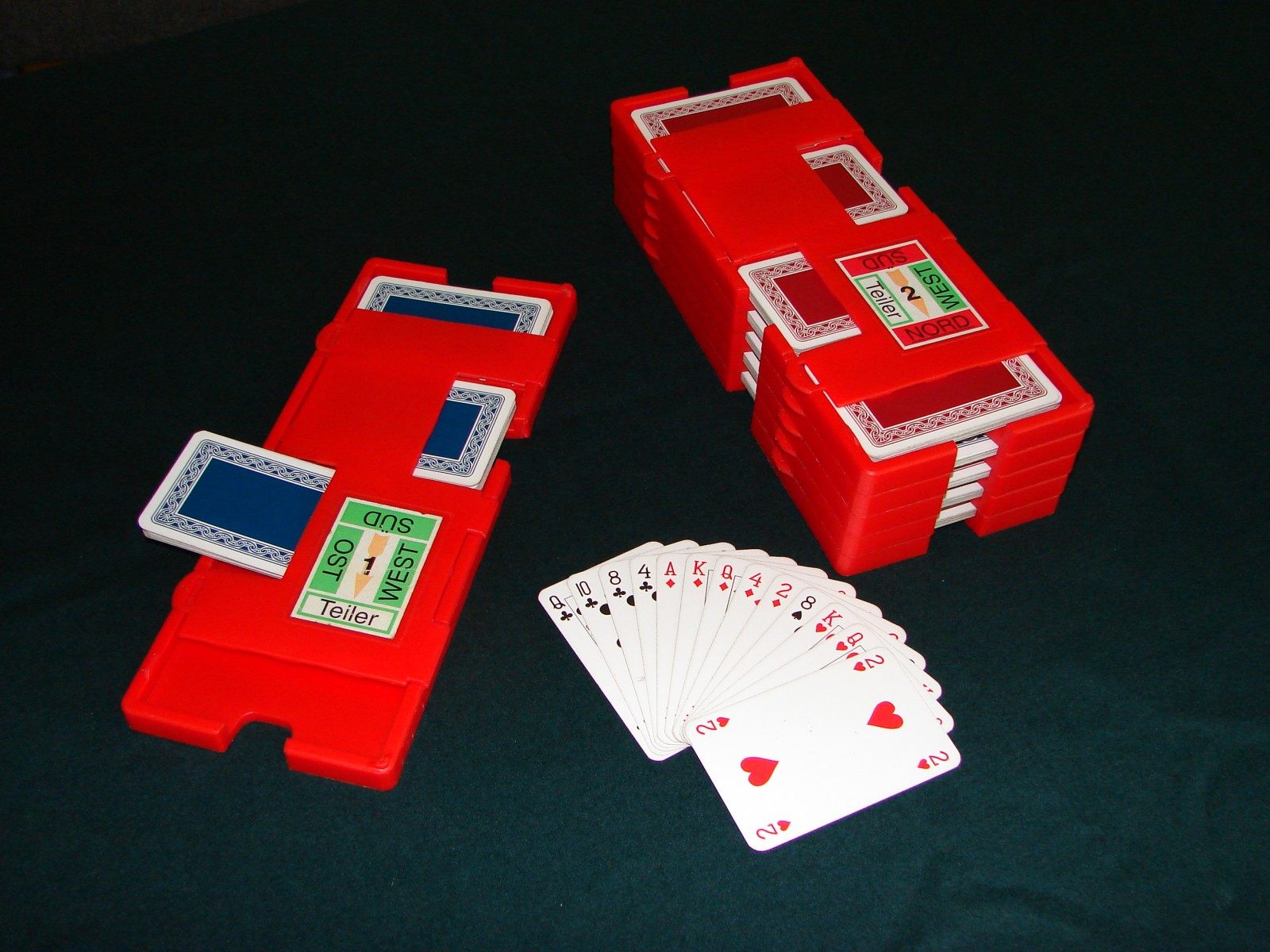
Stacked plastic boards with cards inserted

Each board is usually marked with the following information: board number – (from '1' to as high as '36') identifies the deal and helps to order the play of multiple deals; compass directions – used to match the four hands to the four players at a table; dealer – designates which player is the "dealer"; this designates the player who is to make the first call of the auction; vulnerability – often represented by color code: a "vulnerable" partnership is usually shown in red and a "not vulnerable" partnership in green, white or no color. Most designs include a slot or pocket to hold a paper travelling score sheet.

Colloquially, the term board may refer to unit of the game as being one deal plus its bidding and play.

== History ==
First used in duplicate whist in the 1890s, the devices were called duplicate whist trays. Since the first in November 1891, numerous patents have been registered incorporating a variety of shapes, sizes and materials and having various means of inserting and retaining the cards in place in the trays or apparatus, as they were often referred to in the patent description. Amongst the earliest versions were those manufactured by Ihling Brothers & Everard of Kalamazoo, Michigan^{,} and referred to as the Kalamazoo Tray, a square tray, getting award-winning recognition at the 1893 Chicago World's Fair. The company's interests in duplicate whist trays were purchased by The Duplicate Whist Co. in 1899, which introduced a tray known as the Paine's Duplicate Whist Tray after its president, Cassius M. Paine; Paine used the U.S. Playing Card Co. of Cincinnati as his sole manufacturing and sales agent.

Originally, trays were sold in sets of 8, 12, 16 and 20; after the concept of vulnerability was introduced to contract bridge in 1926 and the adoption of boards for duplicate bridge, a set consists of 16 (or 32) boards, owing to the 16 possible deal combinations arising from the four states of vulnerability for each of the four dealer positions. By the mid-1930s, thirty or forty different types were being sold. The first oblong boards were made of paper by William McKenney in 1928; the first metal boards were by F. Dudley Courtney in 1931.

The most common modern boards are rectangular in shape and made of plastic replacing earlier models made of paper covered pasteboard, sheet metal, wood and more recently aluminum. Boards designed as foldable wallets, originally made of leather, primarily used in England, are now generally made of pliable plastic. While the concept of the contract bridge duplicate board evolved from the duplicate whist tray,

...it is called a "board" rather than a "tray" stems from the fact that the earliest widely accepted models were made of wood.

— Alex Groner, Duplicate Bridge Direction: A Complete Handbook (11th printing ed.). Port Chester, NY: Barclay Bridge Supplies Inc. 1989. p. 16. LCCN 67029818.

== Set of boards ==
A set of boards for duplicate bridge typically contains 32 boards and sometimes as many as 36. The actual number of boards used in a particular session depends on the type of tournament, the number of tables, and the choice of movement used. Often some of the higher numbered boards (e.g. 25 to 36) are not needed. The dealer and vulnerability markings for each board number are standardized in the laws of the game, utilizing all the possible permutations. The dealer is rotated clockwise in successively numbered boards. Four combinations of vulnerabilities also change, but they are also shifted circularly. Thus, a set of 16 boards has the following markings:

Board	Dealer	Vul.	Board	Dealer	Vul.	Board	Dealer	Vul.	Board	Dealer	Vul.
1	N	None	5	N	N-S	9	N	E-W	13	N	All
2	E	N-S	6	E	E-W	10	E	All	14	E	None
3	S	E-W	7	S	All	11	S	None	15	S	N-S
4	W	All	8	W	None	12	W	N-S	16	W	E-W

The scheme is repeated in the subsequent set of 16 (i.e. on boards numbered 17–32); boards 33-36 repeat the scheme of boards 1–4.

== Preparation of the deal ==
At the beginning of a session, the boards are prepared in one of several ways:

1. Predealt – the sponsoring agency has prearranged the cards in the boards, and the boards are given to the players "ready for play".
2. Player shuffle – before the start of play, each table receives a number of boards each containing 13 cards in each of its four pockets. The cards are removed from the pockets of a board by the players, shuffled together and dealt into four equal piles. Each pile is placed into a pocket of the same board. Each board is prepared in the same manner and stacked in numerical order ready for play. The players prepare the different boards simultaneously; it does not matter which player prepares which board.
3. Computer 'shuffled' – as in the foregoing, each table receives a number of boards to prepare. In addition, each board is accompanied by a hand record which identifies which specific cards are to be distributed to each hand for that board. The hand records are usually prepared in advance by a computer program using a pseudorandom number generator. The cards are removed from a board and sorted by suit. The players cooperate in dealing the cards according to the hand record and in placing the correct cards in their assigned pocket of the board. Each board is prepared in a similar manner and stacked in numerical order. The boards will be passed to another table ready for play and will not be played by those who prepared them.
4. Computer 'shuffled and dealt' – the deal is generated randomly by computer algorithms and dealt by machine directly into boards specially designed for the purpose. This is the most common method used in modern tournament play.

No matter how the boards are prepared, they are not shuffled again during the session, and the cards in all pockets are kept face down. Sometimes, at the end of a session or the beginning of a new session, a card or cards will be placed in the board face up. This indicates that the board has not yet been prepared for the new session.

The board may also carry a travelling scoreslip or "traveller" — a paper form where players enter their scores each time the board is played. The board may contain a dedicated pocket for the traveller (folded so as to hide the entries from view between scorings); otherwise it can be inserted in the slot with the cards for North, the score recorder. In many clubs and almost all higher level tournaments, the travelling sheets have been superseded by small electronic data entry devices stationed at each table.

== Play ==
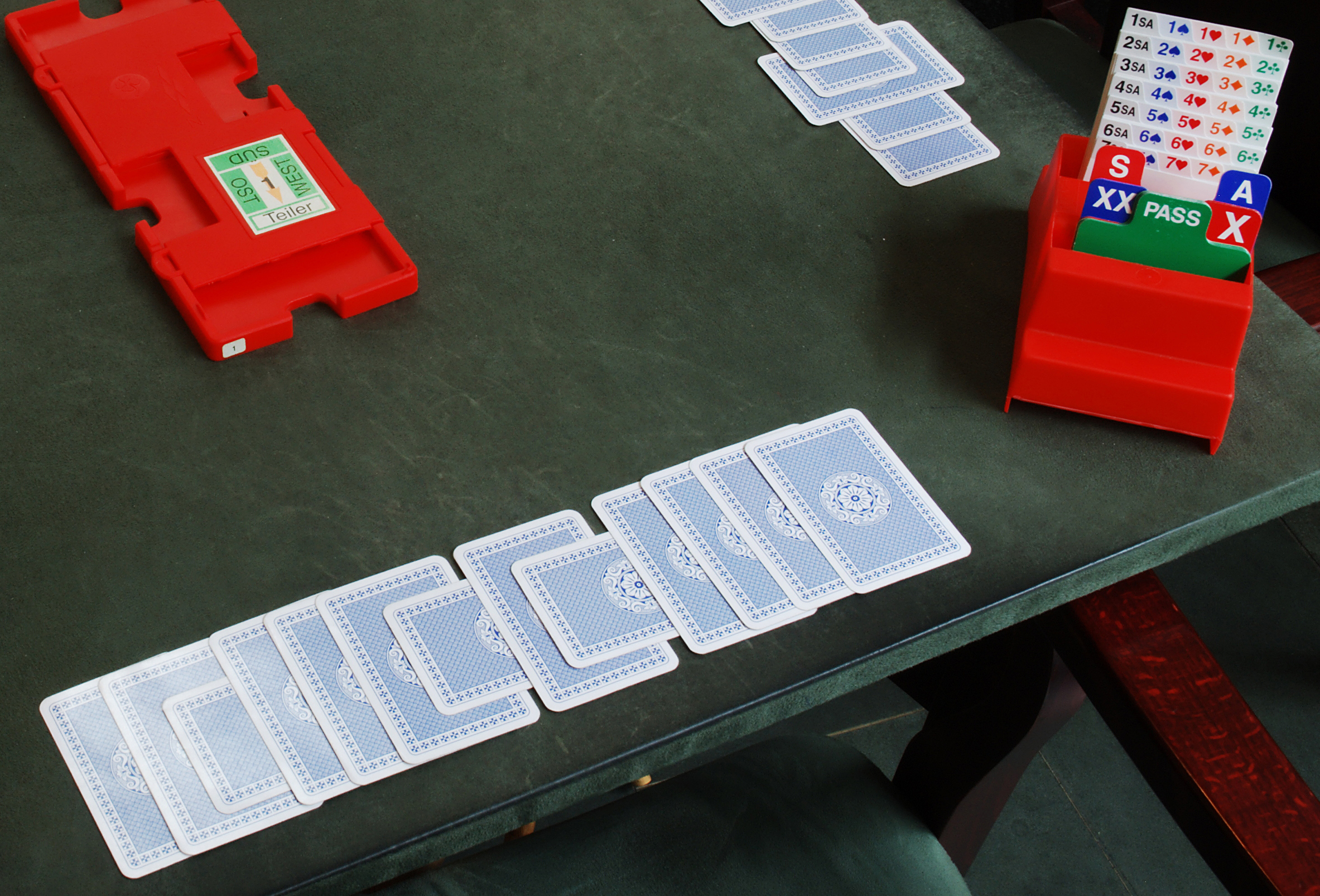
The orientation of the cards indicates that the partnership has lost the third, seventh and ninth tricks and won the other ten.

Play of each board proceeds as follows:

- The North player positions the board in the centre of the table (perhaps at the top of a stack of boards), making sure that it is correctly oriented so that each player's cards are nearest to him.
- Each player removes the cards from the pocket corresponding to their playing position at the table (i.e. North, East, West or South).
- Each player counts his cards before looking at any card face. The director is summoned if any player does not have exactly thirteen cards.
- The players look at their cards (without showing any card face to any other player at the table) and optionally arranges them in order (e.g. by suits) according to personal preference.
- The player designated as the dealer on the board makes the first call and the bidding proceeds clockwise until a final contract is established.
- The player to the left of declarer initiates play to the first trick by making the opening lead.
- After the opening lead is made, dummy (declarer's partner) displays all his cards face-up on the table, sorted by suit and rank.
- Once dummy is laid out, the play of the cards continues in clockwise fashion with declarer stating the card to be played from the dummy followed by the partner of the opening leader playing his card and finally by declarer playing his. Each player shows their card face so as to be clearly visible to all, usually by placing it face up on the table directly in front of him.
- The four played cards are not mixed together as they are in rubber bridge trick collection. Instead, each player turns his card face down and places it in a row in front of him, overlapping left to right. If that player's side won the trick, it is placed straight up (pointing towards one's partner); otherwise, it is laid sideways (facing your opponents), so that it is clear how many tricks each side has won at any time. If a player orients his card the wrong way, his partner is allowed to point out the error.
- The play to all subsequent tricks is initiated by the lead of a card by the winner of the previous trick.
- After the play, the number of tricks won by each side is agreed. If all players' cards show the same orientation of cards, there is usually quick agreement; if one or more of the cards are not similarly oriented, a review of the tricks in the order played will usually determine where the difference has occurred, so that errors can more easily be corrected by mutual agreement.
- Each player then gathers only his own cards, shuffles them and replaces them face down in the board pocket from which they came. The shuffle ensures that the next player can make no inference from the order of the cards in the pocket.
- If in use, the travelling scoresheet is removed from its slot, the score and other details for the board are written on the scoresheet by North and checked by East or West, and the scoresheet is then replaced in its pocket or slot in the board. Alternatively, the score is entered into an electronic scoring device by North and checked and accepted by East or West.
