= Duck (bridge) =

Term in the game of bridge

In the card game of contract bridge, to duck (or ducking) means to play low to a trick to which one has led, losing it intentionally in order to set up a suit, to preserve a control or entry, or to throw-in an opponent. While mechanically identical, a duck is a maneuver in one's own lead suit, while a hold up is in a suit played by the opponents. Nevertheless, the terms are used interchangeably with duck or ducking more common.

== Example ==
	A K 4 3 2	
9 8	W N↑ S↓ E	Q J 10
	7 6 5	

There are no side entries to the North hand. South is on lead and if he plays to the ace and then the king and another, East will win the third trick. The remaining two small cards are good, but there is no way to get to them.

Proper procedure is to duck the first (or second) trick. Then, when the lead is regained, playing to the ace (or the king if the ace was taken before ducking) will establish the suit and the remainder of the cards can be cashed.

Note that defenders can benefit by a hold up play. North, as a defender with (A K 4 3 2) and no outside entries, may do well to hold up on the first or second round of the suit, especially in a notrump contract.
