= Signal (bridge) =

Tactic in bridge card game

A (bridge) signal is a move in the card game of contract bridge in which partners defending against a contract play particular cards in a manner which gives a coded meaning or signal to guide their subsequent card play. This may also be referred to as carding. Signals are usually given with the cards from the two-spot to the nine-spot. There are three types of signals:

- attitude signals – the most frequently used, to encourage or discourage continuation of the suit led by partner
- count signals – showing either an even or odd number of cards held in the suit led and
- suit preference signals – the least frequently used, indicating partiality for a specific side suit.

The methods used for each type of signal have evolved over time and fall into two broad categories:

- standard signals, where a high card or one followed by a lower card is encouraging when it is an attitude signal or shows an even number of cards when it is a count signal; and
- reverse (upside-down) signals, where the meanings are reversed. A low card or one followed by a higher card is discouraging when it is an attitude signal and shows an odd number of cards when it is a count signal.

Precedence of signal types
Lead is by	Following suit	Discarding
Partner	1. attitude 2. count	1. attitude
Declarer	1. count 2. suit preference	1. attitude 2. suit preference

Partnerships decide on which methods to adopt and must disclose them to their opponents. Use and interpretation is dependent upon their context, such as the contract, the auction, the opening lead or prior play, the cards visible in dummy, the cards visible in one's hand, who has led to the current trick and whether following suit or discarding.

Accordingly, partnerships generally have an order of precedence for the interpretation of signals such as that indicated in the adjacent table. In the vast majority of cases, the third-hand follow-suit signal is an attitude signal, but when the attitude signal does not apply, it is a count signal. Usually, it is relatively easy to recognize a signal correctly when the declarer leads – either a count signal when following suit, or an attitude signal when discarding, and when they do not apply, it is a suit-preference signal.

While signals are a means of permissible communication between defenders, they are considered as providing guiding information to partner and are not absolutely binding; the partner may proceed otherwise as they deem rationally appropriate. Because the declarer is entitled to know the meaning of all partnership agreements, including defenders' signals, they are also privy to the information being exchanged; this may give way to falsecarding tactics by the defenders.

== Attitude signal ==
When signaling standard attitude, a high card is encouraging and a low card is discouraging. Attitude is normally signaled when following suit to partner's led suit and when discarding on either partner's or declarer's led suit.

For example, if one's partner leads with the Ace of Spades, one might signal with the nine if the King is held (requesting partner to continue the suit), or with the three if one holds nothing but spade cards with low ranks (notifying the partner that a switch to another suit is likely best).

One can only signal with the cards held. Signaling low is easy, but if one's lowest card is the eight, one's partner might have difficulty "reading" it as low. When signaling high, play the highest card possible. Having easily readable cards to signal relies on luck.

Suppose the declarer draws trumps and one is out on the third round. Discarding should be an attitude signal for one's partner. For example, playing a high diamond card can ask one's partner to lead with diamonds if they gain the lead. Normally, one would have an honor or honors in diamonds in this case. Playing a low diamond card asks one's partner to not lead with diamonds if they gain the lead.

If declarer plays another round of trump, one may be able to play another diamond: this will make it unambiguous to one's partner whether one is encouraging diamonds (by playing high-low) or discouraging diamonds (by playing low-high).

=== Attitude signals at notrump contracts ===
With standard attitude signals one generally plays the highest card you can afford for that purpose. Typically attitude signals are made when partner leads an honor (either on the opening lead or later) and requests a continuation. The usual reason for this is that one possesses an honor equal to the honor played or promised by the lead. Against a notrump contract (especially on the opening lead), one's partner will lead an honor from a solid or broken sequence, such as QJ10 or KQ10. With less solid holdings like QJxx(x) or KQxx(x) partner will lead with their fourth best card. The reason to signal is, if partner leads from a broken sequence and there are small cards in dummy, partner may not know whether to continue the suit.

Examples:

	7 4	
K Q 10 6 2	W N↑ S↓ E	J 8 3
	A 9 5	

Partner leads the king against a notrump contract. With J83, one would play the 8, so that if partner has something like KQ1062 and declarer A95 they can continue the suit without giving up a trick if the declarer lets it hold.

	7 4	
K Q 10 6 2	W N↑ S↓ E	9 8 3
	A J 5	

If one plays the 3, one's partner may take this view of the suit, and may switch to another suit hoping to get one in to lead though declarer's probable jack. It is also possible that one have the singleton or doubleton 8, in which case declarer would have 4 or 5 cards in the suit with the bidding revealing that. If the declarer had bid the suit, one's partner would also be less likely to lead from a broken honor sequence or lead the suit.

Some players agree to unblock their highest honor when a King is led against a notrump contract, and with no honor to give a count signal.

=== When not to signal ===
The general principle is to not signal if doing so will help the declarer more than the defenders.

Example 1: One assumes they hold virtually all of the defensive cards, and their partner will most likely never gain the lead. Signalling is strongly discouraged. One's partner, on the other hand, knowing the situation, should consider signalling honestly.

Example 2: Signalling against a slam is dangerous. Make the declarer work as hard as possible.

== Count signal ==
The standard count signal is to play high-low with an even number of cards, and low-high with an odd number. Normally, one "gives count" when following suit to the declarer's led suits. This will help one's partner determine the distribution of the suit. See duck (bridge) for an example.

Count in the trump suit is normally inverted. Thus, high-low shows an odd number of trumps. Some partnerships (by advance agreement) signal this way only when they have a desire or ability to ruff something.

== Suit preference signal ==
This signal is used infrequently. When it is clear that the choice of lead is between two suits, the play of a high card on a previous trick suggests the lead of the higher-ranking suit and a low card suggests the lower-ranking suit. There are four common cases:

- When following suit on one's partner's lead (complement to the attitude signal): In situations where one's partner has made an opening lead and an attitude signal would not be meaningful, such as when dummy displays a singleton or void in the suit being led, a suit preference signal is used to indicate which of the other two suits to lead – excluding trumps and the suit originally led. The signal can also be useful when a switch to a side suit is not desired, since there are hands in which continuing the original suit or switching to a trump is the right thing to do. In this case, a middle card is often used to indicate this situation, but it can be hard to read.
- When leading in a suit one's partner is expected to ruff: The rank of the card led suggests a preference for the suits to be returned by one's partner after the ruff. Letting one's partner know this may allow one to regain the lead for another ruff. For example, in each of the two hands below, partner has led what is likely a singleton club against a 4♥ contract. After winning the ♣A, the lead of ♣10 for the first hand and ♣2 for the second hand indicates which suit partner should return.
  - ♠ A964 ♥ 104 ♦ 765 ♣ A1062
  - ♠ 765 ♥ 104 ♦ A964 ♣ A1062
- When following suit on the declarer/dummy's lead of a long suit (complement to the count signal): When partner has a single honor, a suit preference signal shows which of dummy's side suits is preferred for partner to return after winning a trick. If there is no side entry, the card is a count signal to show one's partner when is best to win or duck a trick.
- When discarding – see below
- Some defenders use the trump suit to show suit preference. When a defender can afford to play either of two trump cards, following suit with the higher card first shows interest in the higher ranking suit while playing the lower card first indicates interest in the lower ranking suit. This is a non-standard agreement – see count signal above.

== Upside down count and attitude ==
Some partnerships agree in advance to play Upside Down Count and Attitude (UDCA). With this agreement, the standard count and attitude signals are inverted: when signaling attitude, a low card is encouraging and a high card is discouraging; when signaling count, high-low shows odd count and low-high shows even count.

Many experienced players believe UDCA is superior to standard signaling. Most importantly, it is often easier for one's partner to read one's signals. Also, one does not have to "waste" high cards in suits you like.

UDCA, as the name states, only applies to count and attitude signals. Suit preference signals are played standard. Also, one's leads (as opposed to signals) are unchanged—one still leads high from a doubleton, for example, barring another special agreement to the contrary.

As mentioned above, standard count in the trump suit is already "upside down". Experts recommend that trump signaling be the same in UDCA as standard trump signaling, that is, when playing UDCA, signal the same in all four suits.

== Discarding agreements ==
Some partnerships agree in advance to assign special meaning to the first discard.

=== Lavinthal (McKenney) ===
With this agreement, the first discard is suit preference. One does not like the led suit and does not want the suit discarded. One's suit preference signal tells one's partner which of the two remaining suits one prefers: a high card for the higher ranking of the remaining suits and a low card for the lower ranking. This treatment is known as Lavinthal in the United States, or McKenney in the UK. The potential disadvantage of this method is that one always have to give preference for one suit or other when one may not want any switch in particular. This can be overcome at times by signalling for an "impossible" switch, such as a suit in which the dummy has a very strong holding such as AKQ.

There is another slightly different Lavinthal used by SAYC OKBridge Style Simplified: discarding a low card of either remaining suit (excluding trumps and the suit one does not have) asks for the lower suit. For example, if hearts are trumps and one is discarding on clubs, then a low spade or diamond asks for a diamond. Discarding a high card of either remaining suit asks for the higher suit.

=== Revolving discard ===
As with Lavinthal, one has the possibility to request suit preference in two ways. A low discard indicates interest in the suit directly below (a low club signaling spades); a high discard signals preference for the suit directly above (a high spade signaling clubs). The lead suit is skipped in reading the signal. This is considered by many to be easier to remember than Lavinthal.

=== Odd–even (Roman) ===
With this agreement, the first discard shows the following: if it is an odd spot card (three, five, seven or nine) it is encouraging in that suit; if it is a low even spot card (deuce or four), it shows preference for the lower ranking suit of the other two suits; if it is a high even spot card (six or eight), it shows preference for the higher ranking suit. The even card often has a dual function: aside from indicating suit preference, it is also a negative indication for the suit being used for the even card. A high odd card followed by a low odd card may show both preference and count (odd or even number of cards, depending on partnership agreement).

=== Surrogate ===
A surrogate suit is one played by the declarer in which a defender does not need to signal his attitude or count nor use to give a preference signal; usually the trump suit is a good surrogate suit if a trump echo is not needed. The suit in which the count will be given is called the target suit.

== Disclosure ==
The declarer is entitled to know what signaling agreements one has with one's partner, and one must disclose them if asked. However, one does not have to interpret any particular play (and should not, because it might transmit information to one's partner). For example, if partner plays the 5 of clubs and one is asked what it means, one can say "a high club encourages clubs, a low club discourages clubs" (assuming that is your agreement). If one sees the 4, 3, and 2 in your hand, one knows that the 5 is a low club and therefore discouraging, but one should refrain from saying so. As far as one's partner knows it might equally well be declarer who holds those cards and then you might misread the 5 as encouraging.

Most regulating bodies in bridge also prohibit the use of encrypted signals. These signals convey a message that can only be interpreted by knowing some specifics of the hands of the defenders. For example, the declarer's bidding might promise exactly a certain number of spades. By looking at the dummy, each defender knows how many spades the other has. An agreement applied in such circumstances, such as "if I have an even number of spades at the start of play, then we play standard signals on this deal, otherwise upside-down signals" would be encrypted and therefore widely prohibited.

== Falsecarding ==
In general, the partner will gain more from a player's signals than the declarer's, so it is worthwhile to signal honestly most of the time. However, since the declarer can see one's signals as well, a player who gains a reputation for always giving accurate count, for example, may find information given away by their signals used to their disadvantage. It is common practice to throw in a misleading signal now and then.
