= Ihling Brothers Everard Company =

- Industry: Manufacturing
- Headquarters: Kalamazoo, Michigan, United States

Ihling Brothers Everard Company, based in Kalamazoo, Michigan, is one of the oldest Masonic and Fraternal Regalia manufacturers in the United States.

== History ==
In April 1869, Otto Ihling, a 22-year-old journeyman bookbinder, moved from Milwaukee to Kalamazoo to open his new shop. While attending night school, he created handmade blank books for businesses, banks and counties. The first issue of "The Michigan Freemason" was bound by Otto Ihling and edited by Mr. W. J. Chaplin, a partner in the business. In 1871, Otto persuaded his brother Reinhold to join the partnership, and the three men were the publishers and proprietors of "The Michigan Freemason." In 1872, these blank books, records and ledgers became the original accounting system developed specifically for lodges. All had the approval of the Grand Master. In 1879 Herbert H. Everard, a printer by trade, joined the firm as a full partner. Herbert had been born and raised in Kalamazoo, attended Kalamazoo College, and had previously established the printing businesses Pease & Everard and H.H. Everard & Co.

Ihling Bros. supplied many institutions including the Michigan House of Representatives and the Michigan Senate with their stationery.

In the Chicago World's Columbian Exhibition of 1893, the patented Duplicate Whist Trays^{,} of Ihling Bros. & Everard won a top award.

=== Family business ===
At the turn of the Century, Reinhold's son, Carl Ihling, was active in adding and emphasizing the manufacture of Fraternal Regalia and Costumes in a separate department.

Another of Reinhold's sons, Paul Ihling, joined the firm after an education in design and architecture. His imaginative mind and inventive knack proved a great help in product creation and design. Many of his ideas are still popular in Masonic rituals and offices throughout the country.

In the spring of 1909, Otto's son, "O.R.," graduated from the University of Michigan Business School and joined the firm full-time. Following the example of high ideals and ethics set by the founders, the company progressed through depressions and wars under the guidance of "O.R." He led the company for 56 years, until his death in 1964. A deep believer in fraternity, "O.R." helped to design the ritual regalia for many national college fraternities and honor organizations that is still in use today.

The third generation of the Ihling family was represented by "O.R.'s" son, Edward Ihling. In 1956, carrying his Grandfather's sword, he was installed as Eminent Commander of Peninsular Commandery, the youngest in their hundred-year history. Edward was elected company president in 1962, and remained with the company until his retirement in 2007.

Edward's youngest son, Tom Ihling served as the final president of Ihling Bros. from 1991–1995, representing the fourth generation of the family business.

=== Fraternity and community ===
Otto Ihling was a large part of fraternal and community affairs, as an active lifelong member of all the Masonic Bodies. Kalamazoo elected him Mayor three times, 1887-1889. Otto served the community and his business at his big roll top desk for sixty-seven years and worked right up until his death in 1936.

Herbert Everard was also an active member of the Kalamazoo Community, serving as school board president for many years. He was instrumental in bringing kindergarten and manual training into the schools of Kalamazoo, among other progressive methods.

== Locations ==
In 1869, the original building of "The Michigan Freemason" stood at the southeast corner of Michigan (then Main St.) at Portage, where the Olde Peninsula Brewpub now stands. By purchasing an adjoining building in 1911, the physical plant was doubled in size to handle the growing business. This expanded to the corner of Michigan at Edwards St. The final relocation as Ihling Bros. Everard Co. was to 2022 Fulford St., at Alcott St. where they continued the supply of Masonic goods as well as chapter needs for college fraternal organizations. Once the business was acquired by Kalamazoo Sportswear in 1995, they were moved back downtown to Michigan Ave., at Stadium Dr., where they still reside today.

== Kalamazoo Regalia ==
In 1995, Ihling Bros. Everard Company was purchased by James Bellinger and renamed Kalamazoo Regalia. Bellinger was a former employee of Ihling Bros. and fraternal brother of Edward Ihling, as well as owner of the screen printing company, Kalamazoo Sportswear. Edward remained active in the company until his retirement in 2007, and still provides consultation whenever needed.

In 2011, Bellinger officially merged Kalamazoo Regalia with Kalamazoo Sportswear to become Kalamazoo Sportswear and Regalia. Several Ihling Bros. employees have remained with the merged company, as well as the original equipment and methods. The traditional embroidered costumes and patterns from the original catalogs are still being used today, alongside newer computerized creations and screen printed designs.
