= Game try =

Bid in the card game of bridge

A game try (also called a game trial bid) in the card game of bridge is a bid that shows interest in bidding a game and asks partner to help in making the decision.

For example, (using Acol or Standard American bidding) if opener, with around 16-17 HCP, bids 1♥ and partner responds 2♥ (showing 6 – 9 support points) opener is in a quandary: if responder has a maximum strength hand, with well-positioned high cards, then game will probably make; but the information revealed so far is not accurate enough for either partner to decide whether to play in game or only part score.

Originally, opener would make a game try by bidding 3♥ (inviting game) and responder would then bid game with maximum (8-9) points or pass with minimum (6-7) points. Modern game try bids permit more accurate decision-making. Following a simple raise by partner (e.g. 1♥ – 2♥), opener bids a new suit either to show extra values or to ask responder to show more about his values. There are a variety of methods to do so including long suit, short suit, or help suit game tries and partnership agreement is required.

Whichever method is adopted, responder and opener will collaborate to evaluate the additional information and make one of the following choices: sign off in three of the agreed major; jump to game in the agreed major; jump to game in notrump if the suit is a minor; or make a counter try in yet another new suit. When opener has a very strong hand, slam investigation may also be undertaken.

== With a major suit fit ==
Prior partnership agreement is needed to determine which variety of game try is being used:

- Long suit game try – After a single raise, opener shows extra values by bidding a second suit naturally at the lowest level (e.g. 1♥ – 2♥; 2♠ or 1♥ – 2♥; 3♦). Responder can promote length and/or high-card values in that suit, or shortness combined with an extra trump, and jump to game. Conversely, responder with weakness in opener's second suit should sign off.
- Short suit game try – With this agreement, opener bids a short suit (singleton, void, or perhaps a doubleton) at the lowest level, showing extra values and, by implication, side length in the unbid suits.
- Help suit game try – This agreement is similar to the long suit game try, but slightly more precise. Responder should envision opener holding three small cards in the new suit (although the holding may in fact be better, perhaps as good as KJx). Then, regardless of point count, responder bids game with zero or one loser in that suit and signs off with three losers in that suit. With two losers in that suit, responder bids according to point count.
- Counter try – If responder cannot bid game based on opener's game try suit, but has a good holding in a different suit, this can be bid as a counter try provided it can be bid at a level below 3 of the agreed suit, thus 1♥ – 2♥; 2♠ – 3♦ is allowable but 1♥ – 2♥; 3♦ – 4♣ is not. This in effect says, "I cannot accept the invitation based on your suit, but if you had asked in this suit, I would have." Opener can then re-evaluate based on this new information and either sign off or bid game.
- 2NT game try – a less common alternative method is to use the rebid of 2NT as a game try. By agreement, this may be natural, or may be a game try showing solid holdings in the side suits and a weak trump suit, or may have some artificial meaning.
- 2-way / 3-way game try – It is possible to combine long, short and even general strength-based game tries using the following (after 1M-2M): Step 1 = Short suit game try, asking responder to show a singleton, or bid step 1 otherwise, after which opener will show the suit he is short in, with 3M being a surrogate for spades (if hearts agreed) or clubs (if spades agreed). Step 2 = General game try, asking responder to show 6 to 8 points via a step 1 to 3 response, or to bid 3NT with a flat maximum and 4M with any other maximum. Step 3 to 5 = Long (or 'Help') suit game tries with 3M (step 5) being a surrogate try in spades (if hearts agreed) or clubs (if spades agreed).

== With a minor suit fit ==
Because 11 tricks are required for a minor suit game, most players prefer to investigate the possible optimum contract of 3NT before settling for a minor suit contract (game or part score) and thus a trial bid new suit shows a stopper in that suit for NT purposes, e.g.: 1♦ – 2♦; 2♠ shows game going strength and a stopper in spades

== If opener has a weak hand ==
When using any of the above methods of game tries, it is common that a rebid of three of the agreed suit is not a game try, but a preemptive strategy intended to inhibit the opponents from entering the auction. Responder must pass, as in this example: 1♥ – 2♥; 3♥ – Pass.

== If opener has a very strong hand ==
If opener has such a good hand that a slam seems possible even following a single raise by partner, then more information about responder's hand can be obtained by using a game try bid. If responder rejects the game try, opener can sign off in game. If responder accepts the game try, then opener can further investigate the slam.

== Other methods of "trying" for game ==
- Fourth suit forcing (conventional and forcing) – When one of the players (normally responder) can see that game looks likely (25 HCP having been shown by the bidding) but no obvious contract is apparent, bidding the fourth suit can be used to elicit more information from partner. Thus holding: ♠ Qxxxx ♥ Ax ♦ Qx ♣ AJx and with this unopposed Acol bidding: 1♥ – 1♠; 2♣ – ? game should be possible but is it 4♠ (if partner has a 3-card spade suit, yes) or 4♥ (if partner has a 6-card heart suit, yes) or 3NT (if partner has A10x in diamonds, yes)? Bidding the fourth suit (1♥ – 1♠; 2♣ – 2♦; ?) asks partner to give new, useful information to clarify the situation.
- Invitational bids (natural limit bids, non-forcing) – Either as part of, or following, suit agreement, bids at a level one below game are generally considered to be invitational, thus in Acol: 1♥ – 2♥; 3♥ – ? and 1♥ – 3♥; ? are both invitational to a 4♥ game contract. The invitation should be accepted (game should be bid) with maximum points and declined (by passing) with minimum. For suit contracts this method has largely been supplanted by game try bids as above. However, it is still widely used for NT contracts, thus 1NT – 2NT is invitational to bid game in 3NT
- Stayman convention – At its simplest a 2♣ response is used following an opening bid of 1NT to enquire whether opener has a 4-card major suit. Depending on the answer, responder will pick the best game contract.
- Long suit game tries -- This may also be known as 'help suit game try'. In practice, Where the length or strength of major potential contract suit is in doubt, this convention is an attempt to determine whether a secondary suit fit may be enough to proceed to game. See http://www.bridgeguys.com/Conventions/long_suit_trial_bids.html
