= Acol =

Bridge card game bidding system used in Britain and elsewhere

Acol is the bridge bidding system that, according to The Official Encyclopedia of Bridge, is "standard in British tournament play and widely used in other parts of the world". It is a natural system using four-card majors and, most commonly, a weak no trump.

== Origins ==
Acol is named after the Acol Bridge Club in London NW6, where it originated in the early 1930s. The club was founded on Acol Road, named after Acol, Kent. According to Terence Reese, the system's main devisers were Maurice Harrison-Gray, Jack Marx and S. J. "Skid" Simon. Marx wrote in the Contract Bridge Journal of December 1952, that "...the Acol system was pieced together by Skid Simon and myself the best part of 20 years ago." In another account, Marx and Simon...

progressively, infected and re-infected each other with the virus of the game. In interminable slow walks... they would wander round and round the quiet streets, endlessly discussing the refinements of the enthralling game. Out of these conversations—surely a strange gestation—was born Acol as we know it and play it to-day.

— Guy Ramsay, Aces All (1955), Museum Press Limited, London, p. 170.

The first book on the system was written by Ben Cohen and Terence Reese. Skid Simon explained the principles that lay behind the system, and the system was further popularised in Britain by Iain Macleod. The Acol system is continually evolving but the underlying principle is to keep the bidding as natural as possible. It is common in the British Commonwealth but rarely played in North America.

Ely Culbertson and his partner Teddy Lightner had visited the Acol Bridge Club in 1934, after which members S.J. Simon and Jack Marx became interested in bridge bidding theory. Simon and Marx soon afterwards began a discussion that eventually led to the first version of the Acol system.

== Bidding system structure ==
As a bidding system, Acol has the following characteristics:

- It is a natural system: most opening bids, responses and rebids are made with at least four cards in the suit bid, and most no trump bids are made with balanced hands.
- It is a four-card major system: only four-card suits are required to open 1♠ or 1♥, unlike Standard American and many other systems where five-card suits are typically required.
- It is an approach forcing system: as in most modern bidding systems, a new suit in response to a suit opening is forcing, unlike some older systems such as Vienna, which require responder to jump in order to force opener to bid again.
- It makes extensive use of limit bids: limit bids describe the hand so closely, in terms of high card points (HCP) and shape, that the one who makes the limit bid is expected to pass on the next round, unless partner makes a forcing bid.
- Understanding and correct use of limit bids and forcing bids is fundamental to applying the system: all no trump bids below the level of 4NT are limit bids, as are all suit bids that merely repeat a suit already bid by the partnership; changes of suit may be forcing or not depending on the approach bids.
- The level of the 1NT opening bid influences other bids: the normal choice is between a "weak no trump" (12–14 HCP) and a "strong no trump" (15–17 HCP), but normally in Acol a weak NT is used throughout, unlike Standard American which uses a strong NT. In earlier forms of Acol, a "variable no trump" was common; 12–14 non-vulnerable and 16–18 vulnerable.
- It is the only "fully natural" bidding system which does not require a "short club" or "prepared" club or diamond bid with less than four cards. All opening bids at the one-level promise at least four cards in the bid suit.

== Variants ==
Acol is an unregulated system. There is no Acol governing body and no single publication containing the "official" Acol (unlike, for example, Standard American Yellow Card). It can be compared to a living language since it is liable to change at the whim of users. The main versions of Acol in use today are:

- Acol: unregulated Acol, from the simple to the complex, remains in common use throughout the UK. At any one time the version in most common use will be known as "Standard Acol" although this term will mean different things to different players and is sometimes confused with Standard English Acol.
- Standard English Acol (originally called simply "Standard English") or Bridge for All (BfA) Acol. Developed by the English Bridge Union in 1996, and designed to facilitate the learning of bridge and to provide standardised guidance to novices, intermediate players and their teachers. This variant uses the weak 1NT opening (12–14 points) and strong two opening bids. Simple conventions such as Stayman, Blackwood and Transfers are included at various stages in the learning process. It has been widely promulgated by the EBU and by EBUTA in particular, but the exact form is used mainly by those who have learned their bridge recently and those who taught them.
- Modern Acol: a broad term for modern systems based on standard Acol but adding some additional conventions, particularly transfers and alternative ways of playing opening two-bids, as described below. Varies between partnerships, but typically includes two-suited overcalls, cue bids, checkback Stayman, Jacoby 2NT and Roman Key Card Blackwood.
- Benjaminised (Benji) Acol: recognising that strong two opening bids occur rarely, the 2♥ and 2♠ openings are used as weak two bids to show weak hands containing long suits (under 10 HCP and a 6-card suit). Very strong hands (8 or more playing tricks, equivalent to an Acol Strong Two) are shown by an opening bid of 2♣ which forces a 2♦ response allowing suits to be shown. The strongest hands (e.g., 23 or more points or a game force hand, equivalent to the Acol 2♣ opening) are shown by an opening bid of 2♦.
- Reverse Benji: identical to Benji except that the 2♣ and 2♦ bids are switched in meaning. A 2♣ opening bid is now the strongest bid, as in basic Acol.
- Modern Acol with Three Weak Twos: uses the Standard American pattern where 2♣ is the only strong bid and 2♦, as well as 2♥ and 2♠, is a weak two bid. Proponents consider that a Benji 2♦ bid on 23+ or a game forcing hand is too infrequent (about 0.2% of hands) to use up a whole opening bid. A weak two in diamonds is much more common (1.2%). However, some definition may be lost on strong hands aiming for slam. The English Bridge Union's recommended teaching methods have changed from strong twos to three weak twos in recent years.
- Acol with Multi 2♦: this variant of Acol makes use of the Multi 2 diamonds convention, where 2♦ shows a variety of hands including weak two bids in hearts and spades. The 2♣ bid is used as in standard Acol (23+ points). Various uses are made of the 2♥ and 2♠ bids, with traditional strong twos or Lucas twos being some popular methods.
- For options with a weak NT and five card majors or five card spades, see Alternatives.

== Standard Acol ==
The following is a brief summary of standard Acol as from 2000 to 2005. Standard Acol has not changed significantly since that time.

=== Opening bids ===
Opening bids promise at least 12 high card points (HCP), or the equivalent in HCP and shape, unless preempting. Apart from NT, opening bids guarantee the ability to make a rebid over any forcing response from partner. There are six special opening bids which are quite closely defined, and one wide-ranging opening bid:

- Special opening bids:
  - 1NT — Shows a balanced hand (4-3-3-3, 4-4-3-2 or 5-3-3-2). Subject to partnership agreement, it may be either weak (12–14 HCP), strong (15–17 or 16–18 HCP) or variable (i.e., varying between weak and strong according to vulnerability). Limit bid. The weak NT is by far the most common practice among UK club and social players.
  - 2♣ — Conventional game-forcing bid, promising game-going values (normally 23+ HCP) and at least 5 quick tricks. Game forcing unless responder replies 2♦ and opener rebids 2NT.
  - 2 of any other suit — Strong two bid which shows a strong hand with at least eight playing tricks and a 6-card suit (or two 5-card suits). Forcing for one round. Many players nowadays use weak twos or other alternatives - see Variants.
  - 2NT — Shows a balanced hand with 20–22 HCP. Limit bid.
  - 3 of a suit — Preemptive, normally seven or more cards in the suit bid (may be six at favourable vulnerability), weak hand (not more than 10 HCP). Not forcing. 4 of a suit bids are similar but typically have at least an 8 card suit.
  - 3NT — Preemptive, shows a long solid minor suit and is called the Gambling 3NT
- Wide-ranging opening bid (made if too strong to pass and unable to make one of the special opening bids):
  - 1 of a suit — Promises a minimum of 12 HCP and a 4-card suit, 11 HCP and a 5-card suit, or 10 HCP and a 6-card suit. Not forcing.

The wide-ranging 1 of a suit bid is the most common opening bid, accounting for about 75–80% of opening bids. The 1NT opening occurs on about 20% of biddable hands if "weak", or 10% if "strong".

Normally, opener bids their longest suit first, or the higher-ranking of two 5 card suits. With two 4-card suits opinions differ, especially if the two suits are a minor and a major in a balanced hand outside the 1NT opening range. There are pros and cons for opening with the minor or major suit first, and it is a partnership choice. Opening the minor first makes the system more similar to five-card majors.

=== Responses and further bidding ===
Most of the following sections assume unopposed bidding. If opponents overcall or double, this is noted separately in the Competitive Bidding section.

=== Responses to 1 of a suit ===
- Pass — less than 6 HCP
- 2 of opener's suit — at least four-card support and 6–9 HCP. Limit bid.
- 3 of opener's suit — at least four-card support and 10–12 HCP. Invites game if opener has requisite strength (14 HCP or more). Limit bid.
- 4 of opener's suit — at least five-card support for opener's major and 6–10 HCP, this is preemptive and to play.
- 1NT — 6–9 HCP, denies ability to bid at 2 level. Not necessarily balanced. Limit bid.
- 2NT — balanced, 10–12 HCP. Limit bid.
- 3NT — balanced, 13–15 HCP. Limit bid.
- 1 of a new suit — promises at least four cards in the suit bid, 6 HCP upwards. Forcing for one round.
- 2 of a new suit (below 2 of opener's suit) — normally 5-card suit, at least a good 8 or 9 HCP. Forcing for one round
- Jump in a new suit — 5-card suit (or support for partner), at least 16 HCP, Game force.

Note 1: these last three bids may conceal 4-card support for opener's suit, whereas the three NT responses deny 4-card support for opener, and also normally deny holding a 4 card major biddable at the 1 level

Note 2: when supporting opener's suit with an 8-card fit or better, HCP ranges can be adjusted downwards slightly to allow for shortages (singletons or voids)

Note 3: with at least four-card support for opener's major and 13+ HCP, bid a new suit and then jump to 4 of opener's suit on the next round, a delayed game raise. Alternatively, by partnership agreement, the Jacoby 2NT or an alternative method may be used.

=== Responses to 1NT ===
The responses below assume a weak (12–14) NT opening: players should adjust the point ranges for responses if playing a different opening range.

- Pass - to play. Typically a balanced hand with up to 10 points.
- 2♣ — Stayman. Opener responds 2♦ with no four-card major, 2♥ with a four-card heart suit and 2♠ with four spades (denies four hearts). Forcing for one round.
- 2 of any other suit — weak takeout with at least a five-card suit, opener must pass. Some players make use of transfers.
- 3 of a suit — shows a strong hand with a five-card suit, forcing to game.
- 2NT — 11–12 HCP. invites game if opener is maximum (i.e., for a weak opening NT, if opener has 14 or a good 13 HCP).
- 3NT — to play.
- 4♣ — asks for aces. (Gerber)
- 4♥, 4♠ — to play.
- 4NT — slam invitation, opener bids 6NT with a maximum.
- 5NT — slam invitation, opener bids 6NT unless a minimum. Note: some play as invitation to 7NT; opener bids 6NT if minimum, 7NT with a maximum.

=== Responses to 2NT ===
- Pass - A weak hand of 0-4 points, unlikely to make game.
- 3♣ — Baron. Opener bids his lowest four-card suit. Forcing. (Stayman may also be used as in responses to 1NT; i.e., 3♦ shows no 4-card major).
- 3 of other suit - shows a five card suit, forcing to game. Some players use transfers.
- Other responses as over 1NT.

=== Responses to 2♣ ===
- 2♦ — negative. Responder lacks the strength for a positive response. Unless opener rebids 2NT (balanced, 23–24 HCP, which may be passed), the sequence is forcing to game.
- 2NT — fairly balanced, 8 or more HCP. Some players take this as showing a minor. Forcing to game.
- 2 of a suit — at least five in the suit, the equivalent of an ace and a king in high cards. Forcing to game.
- 3 of a suit — Solid suit of at least six cards. Forcing to game.

=== Responses to 2 of a suit (strong two) ===
- 2NT — negative. Responder lacks the strength for a positive response.
- Simple bid of a new suit — 8 or more HCP (or an Ace and a King), at least five in the suit. Forcing to game.
- 3 of opener's suit — 5–8 HCP, at least 3-card support. Forcing to game.
- 3NT — flat hand, 8–11 HCP. Not forcing.

=== Opener's suit rebid after one-level opening ===
Rebid own suit

- Rebid of own suit at lowest level – minimum hand, at least a five-card suit, 12–15 HCP, non-forcing.
- Jump rebid of own suit – strong hand, normally at least six-card suit, 15–19 HCP, non-forcing but highly invitational.

==== Bid new suit ====
- Bid of new suit at the same level as first suit — minimum hand, 12–15 HCP, first suit has at least as many cards as second suit, non-forcing.
- Bid of new suit at higher level than two of the first suit, but without jumping (a Reverse bid) — strong hand, 16–19 HCP, first suit has more cards (at least five) than second suit, forcing for one round.
- Jump in new suit — strong hand, about 19+ HCP over 1 level response or 16+ over 2 level response, first suit has at least as many cards as second suit, forcing to game.

==== Support for responder ====
- Simple raise of responder's suit — minimum hand, 4-card support, 12–15 HCP, non-forcing
- Jump raise of responder's suit — stronger hand, 4-card support, 16–18 HCP, non-forcing
- Jump to game in responder's suit — game values, 4-card support, 19+ HCP, non-forcing

Note: when supporting responder's suit with an 8-card fit or better, HCP ranges can be adjusted downwards slightly to allow for shortages (singletons or voids)

=== Opener's NT rebid after one-level opening ===
The following bids assume a weak (12–14) NT opening.

==== After a suit response at one level ====
The traditional rebids are:

- 1NT — balanced, 15–16 HCP, limit bid
- 2NT — balanced, 17–18 HCP, limit bid
- 3NT — balanced, 19 HCP, limit bid

However, the modern approach modifies the ranges for the rebids thus:

- 1NT — balanced, 15–17 HCP, limit bid
- 2NT — balanced, 18–19 HCP, limit bid
- 3NT — Often an Acol two type of hand prepared to play in NT.

==== After a suit response at two level ====
The traditional rebids are:

- 2NT — balanced, 15–16 HCP, limit bid
- 3NT — balanced, 17–19 HCP, limit bid

The modern approach is to use the 2NT rebid as forcing to game with 15–19 points, allowing major suit fits to be found at the 3 level. 3NT may be used as 15–17 with support for the minor that responder has bid (one option).

After the opener's 2NT rebid, 3♣ can be used as a (forcing) enquiry to seek definition of the 2NT rebid.

The only non-forcing bid by responder after opener's 2NT rebid is a rebid of responder's suit. This means that bidding opener's first suit is unconditionally forcing.

=== Responder's second bid ===
By the time responder has to rebid, it is often clear what the best final contract should be, especially if either player has made a limit bid. If opener has bid two suits, responder can show preference between them. With a strong hand but uncertain whether a game contract is on or which game it should be, he can use fourth suit forcing to obtain further information.

=== Fourth suit forcing ===
A bid of the fourth suit at the 2 level by responder is a one-round force, usually asking opener to bid no trumps with a stopper in the fourth suit. A fourth suit bid at the 3 level is similar, but forcing to game.

=== Other common conventions ===
Other common conventions such as the Blackwood convention and its variants also apply in Acol.

== Competitive bidding ==
=== Overcalls and doubles ===
Suit overcalls promise at least 5 cards.

Jump overcalls promise at least 6 cards, but may be played as weak, intermediate or strong. BfA Acol uses intermediate (opening hand, 11–16 points).

1NT overcall typically promises 15–18 points and at least one stopper in opponents' suit.

Double is for takeout, showing an opening hand (12+ points) short in opponents' suit (occasionally a very strong hand, at least 16+ points, of other shapes)

=== Responses to 1 of a suit if opponents overcall ===
Generally similar to unopposed bidding, but with these differences:

- Double — negative or Sputnik double (up to 2♠, or often higher in modern methods), for takeout, usually showing at least 4 cards in any unbid major. But note that in earlier versions of Acol, this double was for penalties.
- 1NT, 2NT and 3NT limit bids normally promise a stopper in opponents' suit.
- 2 of a new suit (without a jump but above 2 of opener's suit) — at least 5-card suit, at least a good 9 HCP. Forcing for one round.

=== Responses to 1 of a suit if opponents double ===
Generally similar to unopposed bidding, but with an additional bid:

- Redouble — At least 9 HCP, willing to play in the redoubled contract, but often with shortage in partner's suit and potentially willing to double opponents for penalties if they bid a suit.
- Some players also raise pre-emptively with a fit for partner. A good raise for partner (10 or more HCP, at least 4 card support) may then be shown by an artificial 2NT bid.

=== Responses to 1NT if opponents overcall ===
Stayman is no longer available and transfers, if used in unopposed bidding, are not used. The following bids change:

- Double — For penalties in traditional Acol. May be played for takeout by agreement.
- 3 of a new suit (without a jump, below 3 of overcaller's suit) Natural, not forcing, to play, showing at least a 5 card suit. Some partnerships use Lebensohl.

=== Responses to 1NT if opponents double ===
The double is normally for penalties, and it is important to escape into a suit as safely as possible. Traditionally, natural responses are used and Stayman and transfers no longer apply. Other options such as exit transfers are described in the transfers section.

== Alternatives ==
In common usage, the term Acol is understood to refer to a four-card majors system. For hybrid systems using the weak NT opening with one or both five-card majors, a different terminology is preferable.

- Five card spades or 5-4-4-3 system; the 1♠ opening shows at least 5 spades, and a hand with 4 spades and 4-3-3-3 shape is opened 1♣. A 1♣ opening may be on only 3 cards. This can also be played so that the 1♥ opening either guarantees 5 hearts or 4 cards in both majors. In this case a 3-4-3-3 shape would also be opened 1♣.
- Five card majors with a weak NT; both 1♥ and 1♠ openings guarantee 5 cards. Sometimes known as the "Third Way" system; the first system of this type was the Kaplan–Sheinwold system. To handle 4-4-3-2 hands with both 4 card majors, this needs either a "short club" (1♣ can be as few as 2 cards) or both a prepared 1♣ and 1♦ which could be just 3 card suits. Five card majors are more commonly used with a strong no trump, as in Standard American.
- Range-varying systems; use five card majors or five card spades except on strong hands of 17/18-19 points, where a 4 card major may be opened and followed by a no-trump rebid, to avoid the risk of a short/prepared 1♣ or 1♦ opening bid being passed out for a poor score.
