= Reverse (bridge) =

Bidding sequence in bridge card game

A reverse, in the card game contract bridge, is a bidding sequence designed to show additional strength without the need to make a jump bid; specifically two suits are bid in the reverse order to that expected by the basic bidding system. Precise methods and definitions vary with country, bidding system and partnership agreements.

== Definitions ==
=== Standard American ===
In Standard American a reverse is defined by William S. Root as "... a non-jump bid at the two-level in a new suit that ranks higher than the suit you bid first", and by Bridge World. as "a non-jump bid in a new suit that bypasses a bid in a lower-ranking suit already bid by the same player".

=== Acol ===
The Acol definition is somewhat wider and includes any bid of a new suit by opener higher than two of their first suit.

== Application ==
Example

In the auction, 1♣ – 1♠; 2♥, the 2♥ rebid by opener meets the foregoing definitions and is a reverse showing a stronger than minimum opening hand and forcing responder to bid for one more round.

Responder's bid of 1♠ bypassed bids of 1♦ and 1♥ creating a "gap" in the auction (between the 1♣ and 1♠ bids) thereby implying that responder did not possess four or more in either of those suits. Despite this, opener rebid 2♥, apparently seeking a fit in hearts that is unlikely to exist. This seemingly odd bidding is the "reverse" of what one would expect with a minimum opening hand because such action would compel a responder, who holds a minimum hand for his 1♠ bid but with no hearts and only a few clubs, to return opener to his club suit at the three-level, a result likely to be too high for two minimum hands but not if opener has a strong hand.

Recognition aid

One way to identify a reverse is to recognize that a "gap" has been created and that the opener has bid a second suit which lies within the "gap", hearts or diamonds in this example.

1. Opener opens one of any suit (except spades).
2. Responder bids at the one level.
3. Responder's bid leaves a "gap" between the two bids.
4. Opener then bids "into the gap" at the two level.

== Opener's reverse ==
Depending on the bidding system, a reverse by opener usually shows a minimum of 16 points or a five-loser hand and at least five cards in the first bid suit.

Opener's reverse may face a weak responding hand with which responder may have intended (over a simple suit rebid) to rebid his own suit or taken a preference to opener's first suit at the two level. Opener's reverse still allows responder to rebid his suit at the two level, but a preference to opener's first suit must be at the three level. Thus, opener's reverse must show values at least one trick beyond the minimum needed to open.

For example, following 1♦ – 1♠ ; 2♥ – ?, responder may have a weak hand such as ♠ QJ86 ♥ K2 ♦ 8762 ♣ Q74 and be planning to rebid 2♦, a simple preference, if opener made a typical rebid such as 1NT or 2♣, and to pass if opener rebid 2♠ or 2♦. However, following the reverse, he must now rebid 3♦. Thus the reverse has forced the partnership to commit to taking nine tricks instead of eight - based on the extra strength of opener.

Examples of reverse bidding sequences:

- 1♣(by opener) – 1♠(by responder); 2♦(by opener - this bid is the "reverse")
- 1♦ – 1♠; 2♥
- 1♦ – 1NT; 2♥
- 1♥ – 2♦; 3♣ Acol definition only
- 1♠ – 2♥; 3♦ Acol definition only

A special case exists when responder makes a two-over-one initial bid. Since a two-over-one response shows more than a minimum, generally ten or more, opener does not need as strong a hand to reverse the bidding at that juncture. The modern trend is therefore to allow such a reverse bid after a two-over-one initial response with a minimum opening hand.

Opener's reverse need not be in a four-card or longer suit; it can be made on a powerful three-card minor suit, such as ♦AQJ. This approach is useful in investigating notrump contracts and when no other four-card suit is available to bid.

=== High and low level reverse ===
Reverse bids are generally considered to be forcing, with subtle variations depending on system:

- A standard reverse (called a low level reverse in the UK), when opener's second bid is in a new higher ranked suit at the two level, is forcing for one round only, if it follows a one level bid by responder
- A standard reverse following a two level bid by responder is unlikely to be passed before a game contract is reached, due to the additional points needed for the response
- Under 2/1 game forcing any rebid by opener following a two level response, which is itself forcing to game, cannot be passed until game is reached
- A high level reverse (a term used in the UK and in Acol), when opener's second bid is in a new lower ranked suit at the three level, is forcing to game.
- Strong club systems such as Precision Club have much less need for reverse bids to show extra strength because natural suit bids are limited. In that context, a reverse generally shows playing strength rather than high cards.

These examples illustrate high and low level reverses:

- 1♣ – 1♠; 2♥ : a standard reverse(or low reverse) by opener - the 2♥ bid is forcing for one round
- 1♠ – 2♦; 3♣ : a high reverse by opener - the 3♣ bid is forcing to game

In some variants of 2/1 game forcing, the major-suit reverse after the sequence 1♦ – 2♣ doesn't promise extra values — opener may merely show a 4-card suit or a stopper. Kaplan–Sheinwold treats 1♦ – 1M; 2♣ as a reverse although this is not standard in other systems.

=== Later bidding ===
Most partnerships play a rebid of responder's suit or of 2NT in response to opener's reverse as weak and other responses as forcing to game, including preference for the opening suit. Thus, after

1♣ – 1♥; 2♦ – ?

responder's rebids are:

2♥: weak, five card or longer heart suit
2♠: strong relay (Fourth suit forcing)
2NT: weak relay
3♣: forcing preference, three card or longer support for opener's clubs

== Responder's reverse ==
Most standard methods treat a responder's reverse as a game force. Responder's reverse usually follows a same suit rebid or a notrump rebid by opener, because otherwise it would be treated as conventional. Typical responder's reverse sequences are:

1♦ – 1♥; 1NT – 2♠

1♣ – 1♦; 2♣ – 2♥

== Jump reverses ==
The term "jump reverse" denotes a jump bid in a suit in which a non-jump bid would be a reverse. Jump reverses after a major-suit response carry a special meaning. Most expert partnerships utilise this bid to denote game-going values with shortness (often specifically a singleton) in the suit bid and support for partner's major suit. An example of a jump reverse is:

1♣ – 1♠; 3♥

Partnerships utilising this agreement commonly agree that in this situation a splinter bid (i.e. a double jump in a new suit) indicates a void. This is also the understanding used in Bridge World Standard, though other options may also be used.

Jump reverses after a minor-suit response commonly show splinter raises, too.

1♦ – 2♣; 3♥

Jump reverses after a 1NT response to a minor opening are often used to indicate game-going values with shortness in the suit bid (a singleton or void) and six cards or more in the minor suit opened. This agreement facilitates partner in deciding the final contract (in most cases 3NT or a game or slam in the opened minor).

== See also ==
- Flannery
- Blackout convention
- Lebensohl
