= Strong two clubs =

Bridge convention

Strong two clubs is a bridge convention that is an agreement to use an opening bid of two clubs to indicate a strong hand and a strong holding in the bid suit.

In most natural bridge bidding systems, the opening bid of 2♣ is used exclusively for hands too strong for an opening bid at the one-level. Typically, the bid is reserved for hands that are almost strong enough to bid to the game level on their own power, or even stronger. The exact requirements for the bid vary considerably depending upon the system used and partnership agreement.

In most early bidding systems, opening bids of two of a suit signified a very strong hand and were referred to as strong two bids. However, pioneer bridge inventors like Pierre Albarran and David Burnstine saw that the frequency of such bids is fairly low, and that a 2♣ bid can be used for all strong hands, leaving other two-level opening bids for other purposes (for example, weak two bids).

Bridge bidding systems that incorporate a strong 2 clubs opening bid include modern Standard American, standard Acol, 2/1 game forcing and many others.

== Bid requirements ==
The strength requirements for the 2♣ bid differ slightly in different systems. In all cases they show a hand which is close to game forcing. For balanced hands, a 2♣ bid shows 22 or more points in Standard American (Yellow Card), and 23 or more points in standard Acol. For unbalanced hands, the typical strength is about 9 or more playing tricks, or 3 losers or less if using Losing-Trick Count.

== Responses ==
=== Natural responses ===
With "natural" responses, which is the most commonly used treatment, the 2♦ bid is artificial and very weak (up to 6 HCP). All other bids are natural and positive.

=== Waiting and positive 2♦ ===
Some players alter or reverse the order of natural responses in order to preserve bidding space and allow for more accuracy in later bidding. There are several treatments in circulation:

- Waiting 2♦ – a response of 2♦ is a relay asking the opening bidder to further describe the strong hand. This bid does not limit the responder's hand in any way. Some players combine this response with each of the following.
  - Natural 2♥ and 2♠, typically showing at least a game-going hand (4 or more HCP) with at least a five-card major. Some players go as far to require a 6-card suit with 2 top honors for a suit response.
  - Weak 2♥. The response of 2♥ shows a very bad hand (0-3 HCP), making the 2♦ relay a game-forcing bid.
- Positive 2♦ – a response of 2♦ shows values, and all other bids show less than 7 HCP.
- Positive 2♥ – a response of 2♥ show a (semi-)positive, and 2♦ a negative (0-4 HCP)

=== "Three Point Step" responses ===
"Three Point Step" responses to a strong 2♣ opening bid is another option. In this simple convention, the responder specifies the high card strength of his or her hand, without regard to distribution, as follows.

- 2♦ = 0-3 High Card Points (HCP); Very Weak. The responder normally will bid again only to show a long suit (5 or more cards) or a trump fit, but should use "Garbage Stayman" or "Garbage Transfers" if appropriate whenever opener's rebid is 2NT. The opening bidder obviously needs more than minimum values (at least 25 HCP) or a good trump fit to go to game.
- 2♥ = 4-6 HCP; Alertable and Game Forcing. Subsequent bids are natural, seeking a trump fit, typically with "systems on" (Stayman and transfers in effect) if opener rebids 2NT showing a balanced hand.
- 2♠ = 7-9 HCP; Alertable and Slam Inviting. Subsequent bids are natural, seeking a trump fit, typically with "systems on" (Stayman and transfers in effect) if opener rebids 2NT showing a balanced hand. Opener must have extra values (at least 25 HCP) or a good trump fit to go to slam.
- 2NT = 10 or more HCP; Alertable and Slam Forcing. Subsequent bids are natural, seeking a trump fit, typically with "systems on" (Stayman and transfers in effect) if opener rebids 3NT showing a balanced hand.
- Over interference, a Double (alertable) by responder shows a stolen bid (that is, takes on the same meaning as the interfering bid) and a Pass shows any inferior response. This treatment results in loss of granularity only if the interfering bid is 2♠ or higher.

If requested, the explanation of an alert should describe the meaning of the bid completely; for example:

- "My partner's response of 2♥ shows 4-6 HCP. It says nothing whatsoever about distribution, and in particular neither shows nor denies hearts."

or

- "My partner's double of 2♠ shows 7-9 HCP. It says nothing whatsoever about distribution, and in particular neither shows nor denies spades."

This convention for response has two significant advantages and two relatively minor disadvantages over other responses. The first advantage is that the 2♦ "Drop dead!" response alerts the opening bidder to partner's weakness immediately, while there is plenty of room to find a safe landing spot, when partner's hand is too weak to go on to game—which happens quite often in actual play. The second major advantage is that it immediately tells the opening bidder the combined high card strength of the two hands to within one HCP, and thus the most probable optimal level to which to bid (with the caveat that one sometimes can go a level higher with a good trump fit). The first drawback is that the weaker hand occasionally will end up declaring a contract with a trump fit in the major suit of the response. (Note that a transfer following opener's rebid of 2NT over a response of either 2♥ or 2♠ may be to the suit of the response. Such transfers cannot achieve the objective of making the strong hand the declarer, but they still help to find such a trump fit.) The second drawback is that it uses up some bidding space if the responder has an unusually strong hand. Nonetheless, opener's minimum of 22 HCP leaves a maximum of 18 HCP distributed among the other three hands. It is quite rare for responder to hold more than half of them. Indeed, this convention has gained popularity both for its simplicity (comparable to standard Blackwood) and for the infrequent occurrence and relatively minor consequences of its drawbacks.

The origin of this convention is uncertain. Some players have attributed it to Oswald Jacoby, of Jacoby Transfer and Jacoby 2NT fame, while others refer to it as "Castlebury" (or "Castleberry"?), but the present author is not aware of any source that would verify either attribution.

=== Control-showing responses ===
Some players prefer to show their controls (high cards) rather than suits in the response to 2♣ opening bid. This has an advantage in cases when the opener has a strong one- or two-suiter (i.e. has an interest in cover cards rather than finding the suit fit), but can take up bidding space and miss a suit fit when the opener is balanced or semi-balanced.

- In standard "controls," an ace counts as two controls and a king counts as one control. The theoretical advantage of this system is that aces and kings may be more significant for finding a potential slam than other honor cards, but it also may miss a slam opportunity if the responder has a lot of inferior honor cards. There are several variations in the manner of showing the number of controls, all of which are alertable. The following examples of responses are representative but by no means all-inclusive.
  - 2♦ shows 0 or 1 control (at most 1 king),
  - 2♥ shows 2 controls (1 ace or 2 kings),
  - 2♠ shows 3 controls (specifically 1 ace and 1 king),
  - 2NT shows 3 controls (specifically 3 kings), and
  - 3♣ shows 4 controls,
  - 3♦ or higher, etc. on up the line.
- With ace-showing responses, the responder bids the suit of the Ace, 2NT with two or more kings, and 2♦ with a king or less. With (unlikely) 2 aces, the responder bids 3♥. As a corollary, subsequent Blackwood by the opener asks for kings rather than aces.

=== Either-or treatment ===
Some players play that 2♣ can also contain a weak variant, for example the 2♦ weak two bid. In this scheme, 2♦ by responder is a waiting bid, asking the opener to describe his hand further if he is strong. If the opening hand has a weak two bid in diamonds, he should pass. However, if the responder has a strong hand, typically 15 high card points or more, he responds with 2NT. This treatment is often subject to restrictions in tournament play, as it has a destructive potential—see Bridge convention#Regulations.

== Viability ==
=== Advantages ===
One major advantage of the artificial opening bid of 2♣ for all types of strong hands is that other opening bids at the two-level (2♦, 2♥ and 2♠) become available for weak two bids, thus eliminating many possible bids for the opponents. These weak two hands appear 20 times as often as the very strong hands, which illustrates the inefficiency of reserving all opening bids at the two-level for very strong hands.

An alternative is to use strong two bids for hands which are strong but not game forcing, which reduces the range of one-level openings and helps bidding accuracy. However, since weak twos are so useful, there are methods which allow weak twos in hearts and spades and use 2♦ to show a different range of strong hands; these are Benjaminised (Benji) Acol, Reverse Benji and the Multicoloured Two Diamonds.

Another advantage is the relative precision with which strong balanced hands can be bid. An opening bid of 2 NT indicates a balanced hand with 20-21 HCP in Standard American or 20-22 HCP in standard Acol, and for even stronger balanced hands, the opening bid of 2♣ can be used. The opener's rebid (in these cases always in No Trump) then indicates the strength of the hand using steps of 2-3 HCP. Hence 2♣ - 2♦ - 2NT shows 22-24 HCP's in Standard American or 23-24 HCP in Acol, while a 3NT rebid can show 25+ HCP's.

=== Disadvantages ===
If the opening bid of 2♣ is exclusively used for strong hands, the auction becomes more susceptive to disruptive (jump) overcalls (especially when the opposing partnership is not vulnerable) than the "old" treatment of strong two bids. However, that danger is smaller when compared to strong 1♣ system in strong club systems, because 2♣ bid is made with bigger high-card strength and on a higher level. On the other hand, the strong 2♣ opening reduces the bidding space for the pair themselves compared with strong 1♣—sometimes, the pair can be unable to find a fit on a relatively low level (below 3NT), and/or reduce the space for effective slam investigation with cue bidding.

== Other treatments ==
In most strong club systems, the opening bid of 2♣ is natural and promises a hand with long clubs (for example, in both Precision and Blue club, it shows 11-15 high card points and either a 6-card club suit or at least a 5-card club suit and a 4-card major suit). As such, it makes overcalls more difficult, since they have to be made at the two-level. Chances are therefore increased that the side of the opener has an undisturbed auction, and the opponents will not discover a fit in a major suit. However, as a corollary, their strong 1♣ opening bid is more susceptible to preempting by opponents.

Another variant advocates two strong forcing openings, 2♣ for strong hands with fewer than four spades and 2♦ for strong hands with four or more spades.

== See also ==
- Glossary of contract bridge terms
