= Kaplan–Sheinwold =

Contract bridge bidding system

The Kaplan–Sheinwold (or "K-S") bidding system was developed and popularized by Edgar Kaplan and Alfred Sheinwold during their partnership, which flourished during the 1950s and 1960s. K-S is one of many natural systems. The system was definitively described in their 1958 book How to Play Winning Bridge and later revised and retitled to The Kaplan-Sheinwold System of Winning Bridge in 1963.

Kaplan–Sheinwold and the Roth-Stone system were the two most influential challengers to Standard American bidding in the US in the 1950s, 1960s, and 1970s. Although K-S is not frequently played in its original form in the 21st century, many of its features (though not the 12–14 point 1NT opening) survive in the popular 2/1 Game Forcing system. Additionally, a few elements of Kaplan–Sheinwold (notably Five-Card Majors) have become accepted as part of Standard American practice.

Among modern experts, Chip Martel and Lew Stansby play a system closely modeled on K-S, with loads of gadgets. In the late 1960s, the Precision Club system grafted a strong, forcing opening of 1♣ onto K-S, in effect following earlier suggestions by Marshall Miles that five-card majors and the weak no trump be added to the Schenken system. Kaplan viewed Precision with distaste, noting the disadvantages, both theoretical and at-the-table, of combining a strong club with five-card majors.

The principal features of K-S, as revised in the 1960s, are these:

1. Weak no trump. An opening bid of 1NT promises 12–14 high card points (HCP). Transfers are not used, and Stayman is non-forcing. Kaplan's highly successful partnership with Norman Kay used "Timid K-S," which departed from the original K-S structure by using a strong no trump when vulnerable.
2. Five-card majors, with limit raises. A 1NT response is forcing and responder's double is negative. 3NT is the strong, forcing raise. Two of a minor over a major suit opening is game forcing, unless rebid. 2♥ over 1♠ can be weaker (minimum is 10 points and a five card suit) than two of a minor, so as not to miss a good heart partial. Kaplan preferred to open 1♠ with 5-5 in the black suits and a minimum hand.
3. Minor suit openings are strong or unbalanced, or both, because the weak no trump handles all weak, balanced hands. A 1NT rebid by opener shows a strong no trump (15–17 HCP) and a 2NT rebid shows 18–20 HCP. Opener's reverses are forcing. Opener's simple rebids (e.g., 1 m – 1M; 2m) are restricted to absolute minimum hands, and tend to show six cards in the minor. Opener's jump rebids (e.g., 1 m – 1M; 3m) are enormously strong, promising a hand just shy of a forcing opening bid. After a 1♦ opening, a rebid of 2♣ shows the strength and pattern of a reverse, and opener's jump to 3♣ shows a weak hand with 5-5 in the minors.
4. In response to one of a minor, responder shows a four card major if possible with a weak or moderate hand. But with values for game, responder first bids a longer side suit, even the other minor, and may rebid in a major. For example, the sequence 1 ♣ – 1 ♦; 1♥ – 1♠ may show a strong hand with long diamonds and four spades, but it may also be a "moderately strong hand without a spade stopper."
5. Inverted minor suit raises are used (a single raise is strong, a double raise is weak and preemptive).
6. Weak two bids, including 2♦.
7. 2♣ is the only strong, forcing opening.
8. Defensively, simple overcalls are taken to have the same range as an opening bid, and take-out doubles emphasize distribution.
