= Strong two bid =

In contract bridge, a strong two-bid (also known as a forcing two-bid) is an opening bid of two in a suit, i.e. 2♣, 2♦, 2♥ or 2 ♠. It is a natural bid, used to show a hand that is too strong to open at the one level. Commonly used in the early days of bridge, most expert players converted after World War II to the now more common weak two bid retaining only 2♣ as a strong opening suit-bid and changing its meaning to artificial and forcing holding any suit. This was done on the basis that the weak two-bid would occur much more frequently.

In Standard American bidding, Charles Goren advocated that a strong two-bid should indicate a five-card suit with 25 high card points (HCP), a six-card suit with 23 HCP, or a seven-card suit with 21 HCP and is forcing to game.

In Acol, the main bidding system in the United Kingdom, strong two bids are still used by many players. The 2♦, 2♥ and 2 ♠ opening bids show hands which are so strong that if partner passed an opening one-bid with less than 6 points, game might be missed, but which are not strong enough to force to game if partner has nothing at all. They are based on one or two long strong suits with some outside strength, with eight or nine playing tricks, and typically have about four losers and at least 16 points, usually more. The 2♣ bid is retained for an even stronger hand which is game forcing. Modern Acol players frequently use both weak twos and strong twos, by adopting Benjamin two-bids or the Multi 2 diamonds.

== Responses ==
Normally, a strong two bid is forcing for at least one round. Possible responses are:

- A 2NT response is negative, showing a weak hand (six points or fewer in Standard American).

All other responses are positive; in Acol these require 8 or more points or an Ace-King, i.e. 1½ quick tricks.

- Raise partner's suit with 3-card support.
- Bid a new suit with some values and 5+ cards in the new suit
- Bid 3NT with good values and a balanced hand.

Some Acol players allow a strong two bid (not 2♣) to be passed. This means they can't safely be used for two-suited hands.

== See also ==
- Weak two bid
- Strong two clubs
- Acol

== Citations and references ==
=== Cited sources ===
- Francis, Henry G.; Truscott, Alan F.; Francis, Dorthy A., eds. (2001). The Official Encyclopedia of Bridge (6th ed.). Memphis, TN: American Contract Bridge League. ISBN 0-943855-44-6. OCLC 49606900.
- Really Easy Bidding. English Bridge Union.
- Really Easy Modern Acol, English Bridge Union.
