= Flannery =

Bridge convention

Flannery is a bridge convention using a 2♦ opening bid to show a hand of minimal opening bid strength (11-15 high card points) with exactly four spades and five (or sometimes six) hearts. It was invented by American player William (Bill) L. Flannery.

This convention was introduced because of the awkwardness of describing such a holding, especially with four-card major systems. For example, with the hand ♠ KQ82 ♥ AJ643 ♦ KJ ♣ 54, if the bidding starts 1♥ - 1NT (denying four spades), the opener cannot rebid 2♠, as it would be a reverse bid showing a stronger hand, 2♥ would show a six-card suit, and two of a minor would show four or at least three good cards. Thus, the opener cannot easily explore for a 5-3 fit in hearts. Five-card major openers are somewhat better placed, because 1NT denies both three hearts and four spades, so opener may pass more safely but is nevertheless at risk of missing a potential optimum 4-3 Moysian fit in spades. Flannery is also useful when playing five-card majors in conjunctions with forcing notrump, to prevent opener from having to respond in a nonsuit after 1♥ – 1NT when not strong enough to reverse.

== Responses ==
Responder's only forcing bid is 2NT; all other bids are natural. The responses are:

- Pass, 2♥, 2♠, 3♣, 3♦ – to play
- 3NT, 4♥, 4♠ – to play
- 3♥, 3♠ – invitational
- 2NT – forcing bid. The opener describes his hand more precisely:
  - 3♣, 3♦ – 3 cards in the bid suit (i.e., 4=5=1=3 and 4=5=3=1 distribution, respectively)
  - 3♥ – 4=5=2=2, 11-13 points
  - 3♠ – 4=5=2=2, 14-15 points with weak minor-suit doubletons
  - 3NT – 4=5=2=2, 14-15 points, but good minor-suit doubletons
  - 4♣, 4♦ – 4 cards in the bid suit (i.e., 4=5=0=4 and 4=5=4=0 distribution, respectively)
  - 4♥ - a 6-card heart suit, for those who play this variant

== Anti-Flannery ==
"Anti-Flannery" is a variation used in systems which use the canapé treatment, where a shorter suit is opened first. It is used in some variations of Blue Club and Lancia systems. With canapé in effect, hands with 4=5 in majors are naturally opened 1♠ with 2♥ rebid, however, hands with five spades and four hearts present a problem and the 2♦ artificial bid can be used to show that holding. Continuations are similar to basic Flannery.
