= Vanderbilt Club =

Vanderbilt Club was one of the earliest bidding systems in the game of contract bridge. It was devised by Harold S. Vanderbilt, who had in 1925 devised the game itself. It was published by him in 1929. It was the first strong club system. An updated version was published in 1964. As of 2017, it has long been obsolete.

== Overview ==
In the Vanderbilt Club system, an opening bid of 1♣ is artificial (Note: Many of the terms Vanderbilt used in 1929 are obsolete. However, he defined "artificial" in essentially its modern sense, and may have added that word to bridge terminology.) and forcing, and shows a good hand. A response of 1♦ is an artificial negative. Other bids are "regulation bids". (Note: The expression "regulation bid" is obsolete, and is not easy to define. Vanderbilt's 1929 book refers elsewhere to "the regulation or ordinary system of bidding", in the context of auction bridge. In auction bridge, the aim was to identify the best strain. Score bonuses for making game or slam accrued automatically; unlike contract bridge, where the bonuses are only scored if a partnership bids to the required level. By "regulation bid", Vanderbilt may therefore have meant "a bid which a sound auction bridge player would make". An approximate modern meaning might be "natural".) The system was published by Harold S. Vanderbilt in his 1929 book Contract Bridge. It was the first strong club system. An updated version was published in 1964.

Vanderbilt was a very early bridge theorist, because in his 1929 book he explained in detail the reasoning upon which his system was based: "In many Contract hands it is essential that an original bidder be assured of a second opportunity to bid".

== 1929 system ==
The Official Encyclopedia of Bridge has called Vanderbilt's 1929 book one which "made a major contribution to the technical development of the game".

=== Uncontested auctions ===
Vanderbilt defines the potential of bridge hands in terms of quick tricks. (Note: In 1929, methods of hand evaluation such as Ely Culbertson's "honor tricks" had not yet been devised.) In summary, Vanderbilt Club is:

- 1♣ – artificial, at least 3 quick tricks (Note: Vanderbilt himself recognized that this definition was too broad, and that some hands with 3 or more quick tricks should not be opened 1♣.)

- 1♦ response – artificial, fewer than 2 quick tricks
- Other responses (including 2♦) – regulation, at least 2 quick tricks

- 1♦♥♠ – regulation, fewer than 3 quick tricks
- 1N – at least Ax, Kx, Qx or J9xx in all suits (Note: Vanderbilt does not define the 1N opening directly. However, he describes it as a preferred alternative to 1♣. It therefore seems likely that he had in mind what would in 2017 be called a strong notrump.)
- 2♣ – regulation; like 1♦♥♠, but displaced one level higher because 1♣ is artificial
- 2♦♥♠ – Vanderbilt's examples have a 6- or 7-card suit with 2 high honors and 9–11 HCP
- 2N – Vanderbilt's only example is a balanced hand with 20 HCP and stoppers in all suits
- 3♣♦ – AKQJxx and some outside values, or AKQxxxx and few outside values
- 3♥♠ – similar to 3♣♦, except that the suit need not be solid
- 3N – not recommended
- 4♣♦ – long strong non-solid suit, outside values, inviting a raise to game

=== Contested auctions ===
Vanderbilt distinguishes between informatory doubles and business doubles, two expressions known from auction bridge. (Note: The usual modern expressions are respectively takeout double and penalty double, which have respectively very similar meanings to the two expressions used by Vanderbilt.) Doubles should be informatory at the one-level; (Note: This definition would include the negative double.) at the two-level if neither you nor your partner has previously bid; and perhaps at the three-level, depending on the player's judgment of the score and the bidding. Doubles should be made more freely in contract than in auction bridge, because the potential profit is greater.

Vanderbilt does not otherwise discuss bidding in contested auctions.

=== Slam bidding ===
Vanderbilt describes three types of invitations to slam: bidding more than is needed to score game; bidding the opponents' suit; and introducing another strain after the partnership has agreed a strain.

He also says that some slams should be bid on the first round of bidding, because of the risk that partner might pass any lower bid.

=== Bluff bidding ===
The expression psychic bidding is attached to Dorothy Rice Sims, who coined the expression in the 1930s. Vanderbilt described a similar type of maneuver as being known in 1929, but did not advocate it.

=== Goulashes ===
A goulash is a variant of bridge in which the cards are not properly shuffled and are dealt several at a time. Vanderbilt gave some advice on how to play this unusual form of the game.

== 1964 system ==
In its essentials, the 1964 system is the same as the 1929 system. However: hands are evaluated using the modern HCP method; there is an additional artificial bid (2♦, recommended for experts only); and some later-devised but by then well-established artificial bids are added (Stayman, Gerber, and Blackwood).

- 1♣ – about 16+, at least 5 offensive playing tricks
  - 1♦ response – artificial, denying a hand which includes AA, KKK, AKQ or KKQQ anywhere, and any suit as good as AKxxxx

- Other responses (including 2♦) – natural, having one of those holdings or better

- 1♦♥♠2♣ – natural, limited by the failure to open 1♣
- 1N – 16–18 balanced
- 2♦ – (for experts only) artificial, FG, asking for specific aces; opener can subsequently ask for specific kings and queens
- 2♥♠ (and in non-expert use, 2♦) – weak two bids
- 2N – 21–22 balanced
- 3♣♦ – solid 7-card suit, inviting 3N
- 3♥♠ – 7 playing tricks, the suit need not be solid
- 3N – 8 or 9 probable tricks, most of them in the minor suits

A 1966 edition of the Official Encyclopedia of Bridge named Vanderbilt's 1964 book as one of the "mandatory requirements for a modern technical bridge library".
