= Jacoby 2NT =

Bridge convention

Jacoby 2NT (Swedish: Stenberg 2NT) is a bridge convention in which a bid of 2NT over partner's opening bid of one heart (1♥) or one spade (1♠) shows a hand with both

- opening strength or better - normally at least 12 HCP or a hand meeting the "Rule of 20" criteria, and
- at least four-card support for opener's major suit.

The 2NT response is forcing to at least game in opener's major suit. If the partnership also plays splinter bids, the Jacoby 2NT response tends to deny the shape for a splinter (i.e., no singleton or void). However, it might be the best alternative as prelude to possible slam exploration with unbalanced support in a holding stronger than the agreed range for a splinter bid.

== Origins ==
In most bridge literature, the convention is said to have been developed by Oswald Jacoby. However, credit for its development has also been attributed to Leo Baron.

== Opener's rebids over a Jacoby 2NT response ==
With a balanced hand, opener rebids as follows:

- With 16 or more HCP opener rebids three of the agreed suit.
- With 14-15 HCP, the opener bids 3NT.
- With fewer than 14 HCP bids four of the agreed suit.

With an unbalanced hand, there are two common methods of continuing rebidding over a Jacoby 2NT response, the choice of which is a matter of agreement between the partners. These methods differ only in the definition of a bid of another suit.

=== Method one ===
The earlier method uses the following bids.

- With a void in spades or a singleton in any suit, the opening bidder cue bids three of the short suit.
- With a void in hearts, diamonds, or clubs, the opening bidder cue bids four of the void suit. (Note that the opening bidder must cue bid 3♠ rather than 4♠ with a void in the spade suit so a Jacoby 2NT responder who judges that slam is not in the cards can sign off at 4♥.)

=== Method two ===
The newer method uses the following bids, and is included in SAYC.

- With another *good* five card suit (containing two of the top three honours), the opener bids four of the second suit.
- With a singleton or void in the absence of another good five card suit, the opening bidder cue bids three of the short suit.

Less commonly, these two bids may be reversed. The long suit can then be bid at the 3 level and the shortage on the following round, especially if Italian cue bids (first/second-round control) are in use. However, hands with just a shortage are much more frequent and are shown at a lower level by the SAYC method.

== Rebids by the Jacoby 2NT responder ==
The Jacoby 2NT bidder must assess how the hands fit, and generally will have the following options.

- The Jacoby 2NT bidder may sign off in four of the opener's major (or pass, if the opener has already bid four of the opening major).
- The Jacoby 2NT may use cue bids and/or slam conventions to find the best contract if the bidding suggests a possibility of a slam.

== Variants ==
The 2NT bid is used in some systems to show an invitational or better raise (10 point upwards, at least four-card support, forcing to the three level only) rather than a game force. In 2/1 game forcing and Acol, this is used if opponents double and is called the Jordan 2NT convention in the USA; in the UK, it is sometimes called Truscott (Swedish: Invitstenberg 2NT). Some books and articles, particularly in the UK, call this Jacoby 2NT, but this is technically incorrect. Also, opener's rebid pattern has to change because responder is potentially weaker (opener rebids three of the agreed suit with a weaker opening no singles).

The Jacoby 2NT was designed for five-card majors. It can also be used in a four-card major system such as Acol, but it may then be useful to change opener's rebids to allow him to specifically show a hand with only a four-card major, typically by using 3NT. Also, the three- and four-level new suit rebids may be swapped so that a three-level bid shows a long suit and a four-level bid a shortage (splinter bid).

In some forms of Acol, a 3NT response is used instead of 2NT to show a hand with 13-15 points, four-card support and no side suit shortage (a "pudding raise"). The 2NT response may also be used as a pudding raise, giving opener more options to show his hand shape and strength if interested in slam. A different bid will then be needed to show hands with 16+ HCPs, e.g. a jump shift response.

In the Baron System as developed by Leo Baron, the 2NT response was used for very strong hands of 16+ points, allowing slam exploration. These could be balanced rather than showing four-card major support, and did not include the weaker hands of 12+ points which are the most common hand type for the Jacoby 2NT.
