= Blue Club =

Bridge bidding system

Blue Club is a bridge bidding system, developed mainly by Benito Garozzo. It was used by the famous Blue Team and became very popular in the 1960s. It has gained a strong following ever since.

The main features are:

- Strong club system: 1♣ opening promises 17 or more HCP, with step answers showing controls (K=1 and A=2 controls) or HCP. 1♦ being negative showing 0-5 HCP and 1♥ showing 6-12 HCP but with no more than 2 controls, 1♠ showing 3 controls, 1NT showing 4 controls etc.
- Four-card majors: 1♥ and 1♠ and 1♦ openings are limited (12-16 HCP),
- Canapé. With two-suited hands, the opener's second bid is in the longer suit, whereas other more popular systems bid their shorter suit second. However, unlike the "fellow" Roman Club, there are many exceptions to this rule in Blue Club.
- 1NT ranging from 13 to 17 high card points. It can be either 13-15 points, which is essentially a replacement bid for a balanced club suit with two specific shapes, 3-3-3-4 and 3-3-2-5, or 16-17 pts and balanced. 1NT opening is strong version (16-17 points) 80% - 85% of the time. A more modern treatment is to play the lower range as 13–14, and the upper range as 15–17, this removes some of the strain on this bid.

== Advantages ==
- Blue Club gave significant advances in finding safe slams, which other systems of that time could miss.
- Non Blue Club players consider the system to be complicated and artificial but practitioners will point out that it is relatively natural, for instance, other than the artificial one club opening, all one-level opening bids promise at least four cards in the suit, whereas in many other systems, minor suit openings only promise three cards. Also, the partnership establishes whether the hands are game or slam going earlier in the auction, due to the limited nature of the opening bid. A Blue Club opening hand is either minimum or maximum, whereas Standard American, 2/1 and Acol openings have minimum, medium and maximum ranges, requiring extra bids to narrow down the range of the opening bid. Also, all Blue Club bids after the 1 club opening are natural and at a low level, making it easier to find fits below the game level, whereas systems that do not employ a strong club (or strong diamond) must start strong hands a level higher.
- The 1NT has a wide range (13-17), which has an advantage of forcing defenders to wait for one round before knowing whether it is the strong or the weak NT, which can make their competing for a part score difficult.
- Canapé bidding on moderate hands has the advantage that the opener typically bids the second and strongest suit at the 2 level.
- In particular, Blue Club is purpose built, whereas other systems such as Standard American have steadily evolved to enable players to compete against other modern systems. This evolution has had the effect of making such systems much more complicated and convoluted at higher levels. The Italian team captain, Carl Alberto Perroux, is quoted as saying, "a standard Ford, however much jazzed up, won't beat a Ferrari."

== Disadvantages ==
- The wide-ranging 1NT opening can lead to responder having to probe for game more often and is not always easy in competition. The more modern treatment seems to be to play 1NT as either 15-17 balanced or 13–14 with the club hands (but not both).
- Due to inconsistent canapé, responder has no idea which is the long suit with sequences that go 1X−1NT−2Y.
- As with all strong club systems, the 1♣ opening is vulnerable to preempts, especially at unfavorable vulnerability.

Blue Club is less fashionable these days but it was still used by a few pairs in the 2013 World Bridge Olympiad: VanProoijen-Verhees of the Netherlands, Cornell-Bach of New Zealand and Newell-Reid New Zealand.
