= Jacoby transfer =

Convention in bridge card games

The Jacoby transfer, or simply transfers, in the card game contract bridge, is a convention in most bridge bidding systems initiated by responder following partner's notrump opening bid that forces opener to rebid in the suit ranked just above that bid by responder. For example, a response in diamonds forces a rebid in hearts and a response in hearts forces a rebid in spades. Transfers are used to show a long suit, usually a major, and to ensure that opener declare the hand if the final contract is in the suit transferred to, preventing the opponents from seeing the cards of the stronger hand.

The use of the 2♦ and 2♥ (and often 2♠) responses to an opening 1NT bid as transfers is one of the most widely employed conventions in the game. Less commonly, partnerships may agree to use transfer-style bids in a variety of other situations.

== History and purpose ==
First described in a series of articles by Olle Willner of Sweden in Bridge Tidningen in the early 1950s, transfers were popularized for English speakers in 1956 in The Bridge World article by Oswald Jacoby and have gained widespread international acceptance by duplicate and rubber bridge players alike. In the article, Jacoby gave his name to the convention as the Jacoby Transfer Bid (JTB) stating that it was an adaptation of a bid then known variously as either the 'Texas Convention' or the 'Carter Transfer' (now known as the Texas transfer), which was used at the 4 level rather than the 2 level.

The initial purpose of the convention was to make the notrump opener the declarer in a suit contract when his partner held a relatively weak hand with a long suit. This would make the opening lead present first to the weaker hand (which next will be exposed as the "dummy" hand), a situation advantageous should declarer possess one or more tenaces or tenuously guarded honors. In addition, the exchange of information by the transfer bid and subsequent rebids by responder and notrump opener "is designed to help partnerships reach the right contract" (i.e., their optimum contract).

In the 1990s, further developments of such transfer procedures enabled them to be used to even greater effect. The use of "bouncing" and "breaking" rebids by opener offered partnerships the opportunity to find safe game and slam contracts with fewer high card points than with traditional methods. Although not originally described as elements of the "Jacoby Transfer Bid", some of these further developments occasionally get included in colloquial descriptions of "Jacoby Transfers."

== Initial transfer bid ==
The transfer procedure is quite simple and is described first in response to your partner's 1NT opening bid. Since a 1NT opening bid requires a balanced hand (i.e., no more than one doubleton), it promises to have at least two cards in the desired suit:

- Holding a 5-card major suit, responder would traditionally bid two, three or four of that suit depending on strength; using transfers, responder will instead bid two of the suit below the major suit
- Partner (opener) must then bid two of the next suit up (i.e., the major suit in question)
- Examples:
  - 1NT - 2♦ (i.e., "I have a 5-card heart suit, please bid my suit") - opener must rebid 2♥
  - 1NT - 2♥ (i.e., "I have a 5-card spade suit, please bid my suit.") - opener must rebid 2♠

Opener can super-accept the transfer by bidding three of the major with a maximum hand containing at least four cards in that major.

An immediate disadvantage of this method is that it is incompatible with a weak take out into 2♦, although as with the loss of the 2♣ weak take-out when using Stayman, this is not generally considered a serious loss.

== Subsequent standard bids ==
After the transfer has been completed by the 1NT opener, subsequent bids by the transfer initiator are:

- Weak hands
  - Pass, to play a partial game in the transferred suit
- Invitational hands
  - 2NT, giving the strong partner the option of continuing to game or playing a partial game, in either no trump or the transferred suit
  - three of the transferred suit, promising a six-card suit
- Game strength hands
  - New suit, showing 5-4 or 5-5 and game forcing
  - 3NT, allowing opener a choice of 3NT or four of the major
  - four in the transferred suit, to play promising a six-card suit

== Non-standard but common subsequent bids ==
Since a 2♠ response is no longer required for a weak take-out into spades, it is often used in other ways:

- In SAYC, the 2♠ response is used to sign off in either minor at the 3-level. It forces opener to bid 3♣:
  - 1NT - 2♠ - 3♣ - Pass with a weak hand with at least six clubs.
  - 1NT - 2♠ - 3♣ - 3♦ with a weak hand with at least six diamonds.
- One simple use of the 2♠ response is to split the traditional 2NT response in a precise HCP way e.g. for Acol (1NT = 12-14 HCP):
  - 1NT - 2♠ = I have a balanced hand and exactly 11 HCP
  - 1NT - 2NT = I have a balanced hand and exactly 12 HCP
- This has been further refined to include the use of the 2♠ bid as a means of transferring into a minor suit, thus for Acol:
  - 1NT - 2♠ = I may have 11 HCP or I may have a long minor suit. Opener rebids:
    - 2NT with a weak hand (i.e. 12 HCP) - partner then chooses between passing or bidding a minor suit.
    - 3♣ with a strong hand (14 HCP) - partner then chooses between 3NT, passing or bidding diamonds.
- Many experts regard the distinction between 11 and 12 points as meaningless precision and prefer to assign other meanings to one or both bids.
- 2♠ may also be used as a Baron range enquiry, to find whether opener is minimum or maximum, if responder has 11-12 points (looking for game in NT) or 17-20 points (looking for slam in NT or a minor)
- An alternative method of minor suit transfers is to use 2♠ as a transfer to clubs and 3♣ (or 2NT) as a transfer to diamonds. An option here is for completing the transfer to show no particular support, but breaking the transfer to show length/honours in the suit, so that responder can bid 3NT if they think the suit will run.
- All artificial meanings of 2♠ have the disadvantage that opponents can double for lead-directing purposes or to compete in spades.

== Modern additions to transfer procedures ==
Although part of the early writings on transfers in the 1950s, "bouncing" and "breaking" have only become widespread in the UK since the 1990s. As promulgated by Paul Mendelson, they are:

- Bouncing (also known as bypassing). Following the standard initiation of a transfer sequence (e.g. 1NT - 2♦ - ?).
  - Opener rebids 3♥ with a maximum point count (14 with Acol) and 4-card support for hearts.
  - With all other hands, opener rebids 2♥.
- Breaking. Following the same initial sequence of 1NT - 2♦ - ?:
  - Opener rebids three of an unexpected suit (3♦) to show maximum points (14 with Acol) and a poor doubleton (xx) in the bid suit (e.g. diamonds)

With these two devices (bouncing and breaking) it is possible to discover, at little risk, games that would otherwise be missed. However, if responder is weak and opponents would not have competed, one may go down in a 3 level contract when the field was making a 2 level contract (or going down by less).

== Using transfers in other NT situations ==
Transfers work well following other notrump bids. A common usage follows an opening bid of 2NT, where the advantage of the strong hand being declarer is particularly marked. Moreover, a weak take-out into three of a major becomes a possibility whereas with traditional methods such a bid would be forcing.

== Transfers following a double ==
Following a double (i.e., partner opens 1NT and intervening opponent doubles, usually for penalties), there are two options in fairly common use, both of which allow weak takeouts into a minor which is an important escape option after a weak NT has been doubled:

- Reversion to natural bidding; Transfers and Stayman become inoperative (i.e., all 2-level bids are for take-out). This has the advantage of simplicity, but creates the disadvantage of the stronger hand becoming dummy with a resultant offering of information to opponents about where the high cards lie, though conversely responder's hand (which could have a wide range of possible strengths) is now completely concealed from opponents, making it harder for them to judge combined strengths.
- All 2-level bids become transfers according to this scheme (known as "exit transfers" in some quarters):
  - redouble transfers to 2♣.
  - 2♣ transfers to 2♦.
  - 2♦ transfers to 2♥.
  - 2♥ transfers to 2♠.
  - 2♠ (Acol - I have 11 HCP) transfers to NT at the appropriate level.
  - 2NT (Acol - I have 12 HCP)
  - Alternative versions are possible, for example 2♣ remains as Stayman (useful if responder is 5-4 or 4-4 in the majors), and after the Redouble-2♣ sequence, responder can correct to 2♦, or indeed to 2♥ or 2♠ if they wish to play the contract rather than opener. Other meanings could be found for 2♠ and 2NT rather than those above, where responder will normally prefer to pass for penalties, clearly having the balance of points.
  - Exit transfers are also preferable to natural methods if the initial double is not for penalties (e.g., a double of a strong 1NT opening with some artificial meaning). There is then no need for a quick escape, it is preferable for the strong hand to play any suit contract, and the redouble gives the extra options of takeout to a minor.

(Note: some partnerships use a "forcing pass" by the partner of the 1NT opener. The 1NT opener is then obliged to redouble. The partner of the 1NT opener may then pass the redouble with a good hand if they judge 1NT redoubled is makeable, or with a poor hand initiate bidding 4-card suits up-the-line until at least a 4-3 suit fit is found. With a 5 card suit, responder redoubles, opener bids 2♣ and responder passes or corrects to their suit. Variants of these methods are known as Helmic, Halmic, Helvic, Modified Helmic, etc. They help find 4-4 suit fits, but some prevent opener from playing in a contract of 1NT doubled. A further option is using a "SOS redouble" to show 4 card suits and look for a fit, and a natural response to show 5+ card suits.)

== Transfers following an intervening bid ==
Standard bidding in most systems is that all responses following a natural suit overcall are themselves natural bids ("double" may be used for take-out). An alternative is that such responses, including "double", act as transfers. For example, following a 1NT opening and a 2♦ overcall:

- double ... transfer to hearts
- 2♥ ... transfer to spades
- 2♠ ... transfer to clubs

One systematic method for allowing transfers after an overcall is Rubinsohl.
