= William Flannery (bridge) =

American bridge player

William L. Flannery was an American bridge player, born July 29, 1932, in Pittsburgh, Pennsylvania. He died on October 10, 2000, in Bakersfield, California. He was an outstanding high school basketball player, leading St. James High School to the 1950 Class B Pennsylvania Catholic State Championship.

Flannery invented the Flannery 2♦ bridge bidding convention.

== Bridge accomplishments ==
=== Wins ===
Flannery had approximately 50 regional wins including Upper New York State Open Teams in 1963 and 1965 and the Mid-Atlantic Fall Master Pairs 1967

=== Runners-up ===
- North American Bridge Championships (3)
  - Reisinger (1) 1963
  - Nail Life Master Open Pairs (1) 1967
  - Mixed Pairs (1) 1968
