= Losing-Trick Count =

Method of hand evaluation in contract bridge

In the card game contract bridge, the Losing-Trick Count (LTC) is a method of hand evaluation that is generally only considered suitable to be used in situations where a trump suit has been established and when shape and fit are more significant than high card points (HCP) in determining the optimum level of the contract. The method is generally not considered suitable for no trump or misfit hands; also, the trump suit is generally considered to require at least eight cards in length with no partner holding fewer than three.

However, the LTC method of hand evaluation has been used successfully to evaluate unbalanced and balanced opening hands, and overcalls, since 1938 (combined with ‘quick trick’ evaluation and defined biddable suits), and by itself since 2017, before a fit and trump suit have been established based on the premise that a fit could usually be found later.

Based on a set of empirical rules, the number of "losing tricks" held in each of the partnership's hands is estimated and their sum deducted from either 24 (the result is the number of tricks the partnership can expect to take when playing in their established suit, assuming normal suit distributions and assuming required finesses work about half the time) or 18 (the result is the bidding level the partnership can expect to make their contract when playing in their established suit, assuming normal suit distributions and assuming required finesses work about half the time). F. Dudley Courtenay originally referred to the latter option as the “Rule of 18”.

== History ==
The origins of the Losing Trick Count (LTC)—without that name—can be traced back at least to 1910 in Joseph Bowne Elwell's book Elwell on Auction Bridge wherein he sets out, in tabular form, a scheme for counting losers in trump contracts similar to the basic counting method given below.

The term "Losing Trick Count" was originally put forward by the American F. Dudley Courtenay in his 1934 book The System the Experts Play (which ran to at least 21 printing editions). Among various acknowledgments, the author writes: 'To Mr. Arnold Fraser-Campbell the author is particularly indebted for permission to use material and quotations from his manuscript in which is described his method of hand valuation by counting losing tricks, and from which the author has developed the Losing Trick Count described herein.'

The Englishman George Walshe and Courtenay edited the American edition and retitled it The Losing Trick Count for the British market; first published in London in 1935, the ninth edition came out in 1947. Subsequently, it has been republished by print-on-demand re-publishers.

The LTC was also popularised by Maurice Harrison-Gray in Country Life magazine in the 1950s and 1960s.

In its original British edition of years before, it had not been very lucidly presented, and it seemed to suffer from a certain wooliness of definition of some of its concepts... With the blessing of Mr. Courtenay, Gray sharpened up the definitions, plugged some holes in the logic, and made the whole conception intelligible to the average player.

— Jack Marx, in the Introduction to Country Life Book of Bridge by M. Harrison-Gray (1972)

In recent decades, others have suggested refinements to the basic counting method.

== The original LTC ==
The underlying premise of LTC is that if a suit is evenly distributed, i.e. three players hold three cards in the suit and one player holds four, a maximum of three losers can be assumed in any one suit held by the partnership and, in turn, the maximum number of losers held by the partnership in all four suits is 24 (three in each of the four suits in each of two hands, i.e. 3 x 4 x 2 = 24). The LTC method estimates the total number of losers held by the partnership and deducts that total from either 24 to estimate the number of tricks which the partnership may expect to win or 18 to estimate the bidding level the partnership may expect to make their contract. Using either of the LTC method options thus provides guidance as to how high to bid in the auction.

=== Methodology ===
The basic LTC methodology consists of three steps:

Step 1:
Count losers in one's own hand
The estimated number of losing tricks (LTC) in one's hand is determined by examining each suit and assuming that an ace will never be a loser, nor will a king in a 2+ card suit, nor a queen in a 3+ card suit; accordingly
- a void = 0 losing tricks.
- a singleton other than an A = 1 losing trick.
- a doubleton AK = 0; Ax or Kx = 1; Qx or xx = 2 losing tricks.
- a three card suit AKQ = 0; AKx, AQx or KQx = 1 losing trick.
- a three card suit Axx, Kxx or Qxx = 2; xxx = 3 losing tricks.

It follows that hands without an A, K or Q have a maximum of 12 losers but may have fewer depending on shape, e.g. ♠ Jxxx ♥ Jxx ♦ Jxx ♣ Jxx has 12 losers (3 in each suit), whereas ♠ xxxxx ♥ — ♦ xxxx ♣ xxxx has only 9 losers (3 in all suits except the void which counts no losers).

Step 2:
Estimate losers in partner's hand
Until further information is derived from the bidding, assume that a typical opening hand by partner contains 7 losers, e.g. ♠ AKxxx ♥ Axxx ♦ Qx ♣ xx, has 7 losers (1 + 2 + 2 + 2 = 7).
Step 3:
Deduct the total from 24 or 18
The total number of losers in the partnership is determined by adding the numerical results of the previous two steps. Deducting this result from 24, gives an estimate of the total number of tricks that the partnership should win and therefore how high to bid. Deducting this result from 18, gives a direct estimate of the bidding level the partnership can bid to and expect to make.

=== Example ===
You hold ♠ AQxx ♥ Qxx ♦ Kxxx ♣ Qx and partner opens 1♥. If playing five-card majors, you know you have at least an 8 card heart fit.

Step 1:
Count losers in one's own hand

♠ AQxx counts as 1 loser
♥ Qxx counts as 2 losers
♦ Kxxx counts as 2 losers
♣ Qx counts as 2 losers
This is a total of 7 losers.

Step 2:
Estimate losers in partner's hand
Opening partner is assumed to have 7 losers.
Step 3:
Deduct the total from 24 or 18
The total number of losers held by the partnership is 7 + 7 = 14. Consequently the total number of tricks expected to be won are 24 - 14 = 10 and the expected bidding level may be subsequently worked out to be 10 - 6 = 4, or alternatively the expected bidding level can be calculated directly 18 - 14 = 4,

At this stage in the bidding, one estimates that the partnership can take at least 10 tricks and bid to the 4 level.

== Refinements ==
Thinking that the method tended to overvalue unsupported queens and undervalue supported jacks, Eric Crowhurst and Andrew Kambites refined the scale, as have others:

- AQ doubleton = ½ loser according to Ron Klinger.
- KQ doubleton = 1 loser (obvious).
- Kx doubleton = 1½ losers according to others.
- AJ10 = 1 loser according to Harrison-Gray.
- KJ10 = 1½ losers according to Bernard Magee.
- Qxx = 3 losers (or possibly 2.5) unless trumps.
- QJx = 2 losers
- Subtract a loser if there is a known 9-card trump fit.

In his book The Modern Losing Trick Count, Ron Klinger advocates adjusting the number of losers based on the control count of the hand believing that the basic method undervalues an ace but overvalues a queen and undervalues short honor combinations such as Qx or a singleton king. Also it places no value on cards jack or lower.

== New Losing-Trick Count (NLTC) ==
A "New" Losing-Trick Count (NLTC) was introduced in The Bridge World, May 2003, by Johannes Koelman. Designed to be more precise than LTC, the NLTC method of hand evaluation utilizes the concept of "half-losers", and it distinguishes between 'missing-Ace losers', 'missing-King losers' and 'missing-Queen losers.' NLTC intrinsically assigns greater value to Aces than it assigns to Kings, and it assigns greater value to Kings than it assigns to Queens. Some users of LTC make adjustments to the loser count to compensate for the imbalance of Aces and Queens held. Koelman argues that adjusting a hand's value for the imbalance between Aces and Queens held isn't the same as correcting for the imbalance between Aces and Queens missing. Because of singletons and doubletons [and because losing-trick counts assign losers for the first three rounds of a suit], the number of losers from missing Aces tends to be greater than the number of losers from missing Queens.

NLTC differs from LTC in two significant ways. First, NLTC uses a different method to count losers (explanation and loser-count lists below). Consequently, with NLTC, the number of losers in a singleton or doubleton suit can exceed the number of cards in the suit. Second, with NLTC the number of combined losers between two hands is subtracted from 25, not from 24 (explanation below), to predict the number of tricks the two hands will produce when declarer plays the hand in the agreed trump suit. As with LTC, the NLTC formula assumes normal suit breaks, it assumes that required finesses work about half the time, and it must only be applied after an 8-card trump fit or better is discovered. When counting NLTC losers in a hand, consider only the three highest ranking cards in each suit:

- Count 1.5 losers for a missing Ace in a suit of at least 1 card in length
- Count 1.0 losers for a missing King in a suit of at least 2 cards in length
- Count 0.5 losers for a missing Queen in a suit of at least 3 cards in length
- Count 0 losers for a void suit

The following hands highlight the differences between the LTC and NLTC methods:

♠ Axxx ♥ Axx ♦ Axx ♣ Axx - 8 LTC losers, but only 6 NLTC losers
♠ Kxxx ♥ Kxx ♦ Kxx ♣ Kxx - 8 LTC losers, and also 8 NLTC losers
♠ Qxxx ♥ Qxx ♦ Qxx ♣ Qxx - only 8 LTC losers, but 10 NLTC losers

Here is the basic NLTC list. For simplicity, cards below the rank of Queen are represented by "x":

Suit Length
3 Cards (or More)		Doubletons		Singletons		Void
Holding	NLTC	Holding	NLTC	Holding	NLTC	NLTC
AKQ(x); AKx(x); AQx(x); Axx(x)	0; 0.5; 1.0; 1.5	AK; AQ; Ax	0; 1.0; 1.0	A	0	0
KQx(x); Kxx(x)	1.5; 2.0	KQ; Kx	1.5; 1.5	K	1.5	0
Qxx(x)	2.5	Qx	2.5	Q	1.5	0
xxx(x)	3.0	xx	2.5	x	1.5	0

All singletons, except singleton A, are initially counted as 1.5 losers, and all doubletons that are missing both the A and K are initially counted as 2.5 losers. Professional bridge player, Kevin Wilson, explains this concept of a suit that contains more losers than it contains cards: "Think about how much of declarer play is about timing. When you're missing an Ace, you're losing more than just a trick; you're losing timing because the King, Queen and Jack that you might hold can't score immediate tricks. First you must force out the Ace [and when the opponents win their Ace, they might immediately score more tricks, or they might establish winning tricks for later in the play]. The idea of 1.5 losers for a singleton [and 2.5 losers for a doubleton] should be within your grasp." In Kevin's article, he coins the term "modified" losing-trick count, or MLTC.

As with LTC, players seeking greater accuracy can also make adjustments to the NLTC. While the LTC normally uses only whole numbers and players who adjust with LTC commonly adjust in ½-loser increments, because NLTC uses fractions already, adjustments are usually made in ¼-loser increments or smaller. Players might prefer to adjust for the presence of Jacks and Tens, as these honor cards are assigned no value in the NLTC, but they're valuable holdings, particularly when they're together in the same suit, and especially when they're together and they support higher honors in the suit. Similarly, players might prefer to consider a singleton King as being more valuable than a singleton 2. As with other methods of evaluation, players can upgrade or downgrade the value of a given holding based on the ensuing auction.

As previously stated, NLTC uses a value of 25 (instead of 24 with LTC) in the formula for determining the trick-taking potential for two hands. Here's a basic pair of hands that helps illustrate why:
♠ xxxx ♥ xxx ♦ xxx ♣ xxx
♠ xxxx ♥ xxx ♦ xxx ♣ xxx

With both LTC and NLTC, the combined loser count with these two very weak and flat-shaped hands is 24 (12 losers in each hand). According to the LTC formula, there is no trick-taking potential with these hands (24-24 combined losers = 0 winning tricks). We must remember, however, that both forms of the losing-trick count are used only after the partnership knows it has an 8-card fit or better. In addition, losing-trick count predictions assume that all suits will break normally. In this example, given we possess an 8-card spade fit, and assuming the outstanding spades (trumps) split 3-2, the defenders can't prevent the (hypothetical) declarer from scoring one trump trick with these otherwise worthless hands. A losing-trick count formula that doesn't predict one winning trick with these two hands poses a theoretical concern. With NLTC we deduct the total combined losers from 25, not from 24, so the NLTC formula accurately predicts the trick-taking potential of these two hands (25-24 losers = 1 winner).

It's worth noting that these two example hands are flat shaped and are therefore poorly suited to considering losing trick counts, as losing-trick counts are not designed for notrump hand evaluation. Instead, losing-trick counts are intended primarily for suit contract evaluations, particularly when one or both hands are unbalanced. Indeed, when one partner has 12 losers - which can only occur with 4333 shape - basic LTC can't predict 13 tricks. NLTC however can predict a grand slam with balanced hands (examples below). For more information about NLTC, including new losing-trick counts in balanced hands, refer to Lawrence Diamond's Mastering Hand Evaluation.

Also similar to basic LTC, NLTC users may employ an alternate formula to determine the appropriate contract level for two fitting hands. The NLTC alternate formula is: 19 (instead of 18 with LTC) minus the sum of the losers in the two hands = the projected safe contract level when declarer plays the hand in the agreed trump suit. So, 7.5 losers opposite 7.5 losers leads to: 19-(7.5+7.5) = 19-15 = 4 (4-level contract). Players who use the basic LTC variation of this formula (i.e. 18 - total combined losers = suggested safe contract level) will recognize the difference between 25 and 19 as the number of tricks required by declarer to secure a "book", which is 6.

So, with 6.5 losers opposite 9.5 losers, we would calculate (19-16) = 3-level contract, or (25-16) = 9 tricks. With 4.5 losers opposite 7.5 losers: (19-12) = 7-level contract, or (25-12) = 13 tricks. This can help guide the bidding, as a standard opening hand typically has no more than 7.5 losers, and a typical hand with enough strength to respond typically has no more than 9.5 losers. So, when an 8-card or longer major-suit fit has been established, if the opening bidder holds a hand that has one less loser than a minimum opening hand, then opener can safely invite to game and bid to the three-level. If opener holds a hand that has two fewer losers than a minimum opening hand, then opener can force to game.

If an uncontested auction has proceeded as 1D-1H, then opener with four-card heart support would act according to the following guidelines:

- 7.5 losers: minimum values (simple raise)
- 6.5 losers: game-invitational values (a jump to three, for example)
- 5.5 losers: game-forcing values
- 4.5 losers: consider investigating slam
- 3.5 losers: investigate slam

Next consider responder's hand. Opposite partner's 1H or 1S opening, with 3-card support, responder knows an 8+ fit exists and can bid according to the following table:

- 9.5 losers: minimum values (simple raise)
- 8.5 losers: game-invitational values
- 7.5 losers: game-forcing values
- 6.5 losers: consider investigating slam
- 5.5 losers: investigate slam

N.B. since this response system focuses on major-fits, it can be seen that to reach a minor-suit game at the 5-level, the hand must have one less loser for each of the above-listed actions.

The NLTC solves the problem that the LTC method underestimates the trick taking potential by one on hands with a balance between 'ace-losers' and 'queen-losers'. For instance, the LTC can never predict a grand slam when both hands are 4333 distribution:

♠♤	KQJ2	W E	♠♤	A543
♥	KQ2	W E	♥	A43
♦	KQ2	W E	♦	A43
♣♧	KQ2	W E	♣♧	A43

will yield 13 tricks when played in spades on around 95% of occasions (failing only on a 5:0 trump break or on a ruff of the lead from a 7-card suit). However this combination is valued as only 12 tricks using the basic method (24 minus 4 and 8 losers = 12 tricks); whereas using the NLTC it is valued at 13 tricks (25 minus 12/2 and 12/2 losers = 13 tricks). Note, if the west hand happens to hold a small spade instead of the jack, both the LTC as well as the NLTC count would remain unchanged, whilst the chance of making 13 tricks falls to 67%. The NLTC also helps to prevent overstatement on hands which are missing aces. For example:

♠♤	AQ432	W E	♠♤	K8765
♥	KQ	W E	♥	32
♦	KQ52	W E	♦	43
♣♧	32	W E	♣♧	KQ54

will yield 10 tricks. The NLTC predicts this accurately (13/2 + 17/2 = 15 losers, subtracted from 25 = 10 tricks); whereas the basic LTC predicts 12 tricks (5 + 7 = 12 losers, subtracted from 24 = 12).

== Further bidding ==
Whichever method is being used, utilizing LTC evaluation need not stop after the opening bid and the response. Assuming opener bids 1♥ and partner responds 2♥; opener will know from this bid that partner has 9 losers (using basic LTC), if opener has 5 losers rather than the systemically assumed 7, then the calculation changes to (5 + 9 = 14 deducted from 24 = 10) and game becomes apparent!

A small number of modern bidding systems systemically utilize multiple responses and rebids after the opening bid to refine LTC evaluation and to allow further adjustments to be made based on combined suit length, shortages found, and high cards held. The Imperspicuity losing trick count bridge bidding system uses the Law of Total Losers, shape asking relay bidding, loser asking relay bidding, CROSS and CRO relay bidding, and LTC techniques, to systemically determine the final bidding level, after opening bids and overcalls are initially made based on LTC evaluation methods.

== Limitations of the method ==
All LTC methods are only valid if trump fit (4-4, 5-3 or better) is evident and, even then, care is required to avoid counting double values in the same suit e.g. KQxx (1 loser in LTC) opposite a singleton x (also 1 loser in LTC).

Regardless which hand evaluation is used (HCP, LTC, NLTC, etc.) without the partners exchanging information about specific suit strengths and suit lengths, a suboptimal evaluation of the trick taking potential of the combined hands will often result. Consider the examples:

♠♤	QJ53	W E	♠♤	AK874
♥	743	W E	♥	A5
♦	KJ2	W E	♦	AQ54
♣♧	632	W E	♣♧	54

♠♤	QJ53	W E	♠♤	AK874
♥	743	W E	♥	A5
♦	632	W E	♦	AQ54
♣♧	KJ2	W E	♣♧	54

Both layouts are the same, except for the swapping of West's minor suits. So in both cases East and West have exactly the same strength in terms of HCP, LTC, NLTC etc. Yet, the layout on the left may be expected to produce 10 tricks in spades, whilst on a bad day the layout to the right would even fail to produce 9 tricks.

The difference between the two layouts is that on the left the high cards in the minor suits of both hands work in combination, whilst on the right hand side the minor suit honours fail to do so. Obviously on hands like these, it does not suffice to evaluate each hand individually. When inviting for game, both partners need to communicate in which suit they can provide assistance in the form of high cards, and adjust their hand evaluations accordingly. Conventional agreements like helpsuit trials and short suit trials are available for this purpose.
