= Ogust convention =

Ogust is a bridge convention used by responder after his partner has made a weak-two opening bid; its purpose is to gauge the strength of the weak-two bidder's hand. Named after Harold A. Ogust from the United States, the convention is also known as the 'Blue Club response' from the bidding system developed by Benito Garozzo.

== Application ==
After a weak-two opening bid, a forcing relay bid of 2NT by responder asks opener to describe the strength and quality of his hand. Responder usually has values worthy of an opening bid and is interested in game, although he does not guarantee trump support.

== Responses ==
The standard responses to the Ogust convention are:

- 3♣ shows a "minimal" hand with a "poor" suit
- 3♦ shows a "minimal" hand with a "good" suit
- 3♥ shows a "maximal" hand with a "poor" suit
- 3♠ shows a "maximal" hand with a "good" suit
- 3NT shows a "solid" suit (that is, AKQ of the long suit)

The definitions of "minimal" and "maximal" hands and "poor" and "good" suits are matters of partnership agreement. Many players regard a "minimal" hand as 6-7 high card points (HCP) and a "maximal" hand as 8 or more HCP. There is more variation in the interpretation of "poor" and "good" suits. Partnerships that are strict in their preempts tend to regard only suits with two of the top three or three of the top five cards as "good" while partnerships that preempt with poorer suits may describe weaker suits as "good."

After knowing the quality of opener's hand, responder can set the contract.

== Variants ==
There are many variants to the Ogust convention. Some partnerships reverse the meaning of 3♦ and 3♥, which is Ogust's original formula.

- 3♣ shows a "minimal" hand with a "poor" suit
- 3♦ shows a "maximal" hand with a "poor" suit
- 3♥ shows a "minimal" hand with a "good" suit
- 3♠ shows a "maximal" hand with a "good" suit

Ogust's original formula also did not include the 3NT bid showing a solid suit.

Other variants define a "poor" suit to be one of the top three honors, and a good suit to be two of the top three honors, with "solid" suit denoting AKQ, or define minimum strength to be 6-8 HCP, and maximum strength to be 9-10 HCP (Benji Acol)
