= Strong club system =

Set of bidding conventions and agreements used in the game of contract bridge

The Strong Club System is a set of bidding conventions and agreements used in the game of contract bridge and is based upon an opening bid of 1♣ as being an artificial forcing bid promising a strong hand. The strong 1 ♣ opening is assigned a minimum strength promising 16 or more high card points. All other bids would therefore be limited to a maximum of 15 high card points. There are several variants of the strong club system and all are classified as artificial because the bids are highly codified.

== Strengths and weaknesses ==
There are two generally acknowledged strengths of the strong club systems:

1. accuracy in uncontested slam-strength auctions, because the bidding starts at such a low level when opener has a fairly strong hand.
2. the fact that all other opening bids have their strength capped by the strong club means more accurate judgment and scope for tactical operation both in constructive and competitive bidding.

The generally acknowledged weakness of such systems is the fact that the opponents can aggressively overcall the 1♣ bid to deprive the stronger opponents of their bidding room, and that the loss of the 1♣ opening bid often causes strain on other opening bids, most often 1♦ and 2♣.

== Variants ==
There are several types of strong club systems

- Precision Club - It uses five-card majors (opening 1♥ or 1♠ promises five) which makes them very powerful at the cost of opening 40% of hands with 1♦.
- Moscito - invented by the Australian expert Paul Marston in the mid-1980s.
- Blue Club - invented by Benito Garozzo.
- Hybrid Club - invented by Ron Vickery and Billy Handy in the early 1980s

== History ==
The original strong club system was the Vanderbilt Club, invented in the 1920s by Harold Vanderbilt. For many years, the most popular strong club systems were the Schenken Club in the US and the Neapolitan and Blue Team Club systems in Europe. Both are four-card major systems. The former is patterned closely after the Standard American bidding of the time and the latter is characterized by canapé (bidding the second-longer suit) in many situations.

== See also ==
- Contract bridge
- Bidding system
