= Harold Ogust =

American bridge player

Harold Ogust (1917-April 24, 1978) was an American bridge player who invented the Ogust convention.

He was born and died in New York.

== Bridge accomplishments ==
=== Wins ===
- North American Bridge Championships (4)
  - Reisinger (2) 1957, 1963
  - Spingold (2) 1956, 1960

=== Runners-up ===
- Bermuda Bowl (1) 1957
- North American Bridge Championships (5)
  - Reisinger (1) 1945
  - Spingold (1) 1966
  - Vanderbilt (3) 1955, 1959, 1962
