= Weak two bid =

Treatment in contract bridge

The weak two bid is a common treatment used in the game of contract bridge, where an opening bid of two diamonds, hearts or spades signifies a weak hand, typically containing a long suit. It may be deployed within any system structure that offers a forcing artificial opening to handle hands of (eg) 20+ points, or an expectation of 8 or more tricks. It is form of preemptive bid.

The strong call releases any remaining two level openings for pre-empting your opponents. In North America it is commonly used in combination with the strong two clubs convention. Worldwide there are many other variants, the commonest being a strong one club. “Weak Two” refers specifically to an opening bid, not to be confused with the "weak jump overcall". That denotes a similar hand type, made over an opponent's opening bid.

== Variations ==
Requirements for a weak two bid vary by partnership. A common agreement is that it requires:

- a good suit of exactly 6 cards in diamonds, hearts or spades; longer suits make a higher preemptive opening bid
- no 5-card suit. No 4-card major side suit
- in tournament play, the announced range for a weak two-bid varies in a 5-11 HCP range, often subject to vulnerability and seat position. Many perceive hands with 6-card suit and 11 HCP strong enough to open at the one level; see Rule of 20. Agreements should ensure no gap between the one level and two level call.

What qualifies as "a good suit" is a further matter of partnership agreement. American Contract Bridge League recommends that it contain 2+ top honours, or 3 of the top 5 cards in the suit. However it also licenses conventions to enquire how many of these are held.

== History ==
A prototype of the weak two was used in auction bridge, and the principle was attested as early as 1910 by J.B. Elwell. It was incorporated into the Vanderbilt Club system. In early 1940s, Howard Schenken developed the modern weak two-bid along lines similar to Vanderbilt's.

In Charles Goren's original bidding system, when a player opened the bidding with two of a suit, this signified that the player held a very strong hand. (This later became known as the strong two bid.) Later players found it more effective to reserve only the conventional two clubs opening, to show a strong hand. That left the room for opening bids of 2D, 2H, or 2S to show a weak hand with a six-card suit. This became known as the weak two bid. In some systems, a bid of 2C shows a strong hand with a five-card suit, and a bid of 2D shows a hand that is similarly strong, but balanced. These alternate versions are less common.

== Responses ==
Standard American responses to weak twos are as follows:

- A raise of the bid suit extends the preempt, and is to play. The weak two bidder does not bid again.
- A bid of 2NT is 17+ artificial forcing enquiry.
- A new suit is forcing and at least invitational.

This is known as RONF for raise only non-forcing bid.

After a 2NT enquiry.

- A bid of three of any suit other than the suit of the "weak two" bid shows a "feature" (typically either an ace or a king) in the named suit and maximum.
- A bid of three of the suit of the "weak two" bid denies a "feature" in any other suit and is minimum.
- A bid of 3NT shows a maximum without a feature.

== Common Variations ==
New suit shows a stop for NT.

Weak Pulls

- A new suit at the lowest level shows a weak hand with a long suit and is to play.

Ogust

- When using the Ogust convention, the following alertable responses apply:
  - 3C shows a "minimum" hand and a "poor" suit.
  - 3D shows a "minimum" hand and a "good" suit.
  - 3H shows a "maximum" hand and a "poor" suit.
  - 3S shows a "maximum" hand and a "good" suit.
  - 3NT shows A-K-Q of the preempt suit.
    Here, the definitions of "minimum" and "maximum" hands and "poor" and "good" suits are matters of partnership agreement.
  - A range of seven HCP or less for a "minimum" hand and eight HCP or more for a "maximum" hand is fairly typical.
  - Since "strict" preempts usually show either K-Q or better or Q-J-10 or better, partners who play "strict" preempts typically regard a "good" suit as something more (K-Q-J or better, for example). On the other hand, partners who are less strict in their preempts might define a "good" suit to have either K-Q or better or Q-J-10 or better and a "poor" suit to have anything less.
    There are several variations on the Ogust convention. Ogust's original definition, for example, had the swapped responses in the red suits and did not include the 3NT response. The responses shown here, however, are now considered to be standard.

== Parallel Twos ==
Playing Parallel Twos an opening 2C shows five hearts 7-11 HCP, 2D shows five spades 7-11 HCP. The 2C and 2D opener's are referred to as Parallel Twos because they are played in parallel with the regular six card weak twos in hearts and spades. You can play them in any bidding system Acol, SAYC, Precision, Blue Club etc. See the eBook "Parallel Twos For You" N.Jones June 2014.

== Muiderberg / Woo Twos and Lucas Twos ==
The European Muiderberg convention, (co-invented by Alan Woo of London) allows weak two-level bids to be made on 5-card suits with a 4+ lower ranking side suit. They have equal pre-emption and are more common than the 6-card, or 5-5 hand types. Typically a non-vulnerable Muiderberg Two shows 5-9 points, 2NT is often used as strong enquiry, with 3C asking opener to pass or correct to 3D). This style melds well with a multi 2 diamonds so that regular 6-card hand types may also be expressed.

Lucas twos are more flexible. Opener opens with five card suit. Four card suit may be higher or lower.

== Assumed Fit preempts ==
An opening showing either 5+4+ or 4+4+ cards in two specified suits. Superficially reckless, the hand type is extremely common, around 2½ times more so than the 6+ type. The risk is to be taken for a penalty. Against that your probability of finding an eight card or better fit is 68%, and 65% respectively. The law of total tricks protects you at two level, as if a significant penalty is available, opponents will often do better bidding game in their own fit denomination.

== Parallel Twos ==
Playing Parallel Twos an opening 2C shows five hearts 7-11 HCP, 2D shows five spades 7-11 HCP. The 2C and 2D openings are referred to as Parallel Twos because they are played in parallel with the regular six card weak twos in hearts and spades. You can play them in any bidding system: Acol, SAYC, Precision, Blue Club etc.

== Antispades Twos ==
Antispades Twos (also known as Antispades Weak Twos) make up a two-level opening based on either a six-card suit or a two-suiter with at least nine cards distributed across any two suits. The 2C opening promises 5-10 HCP and either a 6-card club suit, or clubs and diamonds, or clubs and spades. The 2D opening promises 5-10 HCP and either a 6-card diamond suit, or diamonds and hearts, or diamonds and spades. The 2H opening promises 5-10 HCP and either a 6-card heart suit, or hearts and spades, or hearts and clubs. (The 2S opening is artificial and very strong, promising either 23+ HCP balanced, or a hand of 16+ HCP with four losers or fewer.)

Partnerships can adopt Weak, Parallel, Lucas or Antispades Twos and retain their existing one-level bidding structure — for example, Acol or Five-card Majors — along with a strong balanced meaning for the 2NT opening.

== See also ==
- Weak Two Archive (2008)
- Preempt
- Strong two bid
- Antispades Twos
- Multi two diamonds
