= Convention card =

Agreement between the cooperating players in Bridge

In contract bridge and particularly in duplicate bridge a convention card is a summary of the conventions and treatments that a particular pair is using. The Laws of Duplicate Bridge specify that "Each partnership has a duty to make available its partnership understandings to opponents before commencing play against them."

In games regulated by the American Contract Bridge League (ACBL), this is generally done using a form with a standard format. The ACBL General Conditions of Contest specify that "Each member of a partnership must have a completely filled out convention card available for the opponents." Convention card formats may vary by jurisdiction. There are also various computer programs which a player may use to create and print a convention card.
