= Baron convention =

Bidding system in the game of contract bridge

The Baron bidding system in contract bridge was developed in England in the 1940s as a variant of Acol and incorporates several conventions including the Baron Three Clubs, the Baron Notrump Overcall, the Baron Two Notrump Response and the Baron Two Spades and Three Spades.

== Baron Three Clubs ==
The Baron Three Clubs is an alternative to the responder using Stayman over a 2NT opening bid. The responder will have five points or more and an unbalanced hand. The responder bids 3♣, which asks opener to bid his four-card suits in ascending order. If clubs are the only four-card suit, the opener bids 3NT.

If there are two four-card suits (one being clubs), the opener bids the higher first and then 3NT for the clubs if no fit is found. The opener's 2NT is a limited bid and the responder has not shown the strength of his hand, therefore the responder will control how high the bidding goes, game or prospecting for a slam, and the suit to be played. The main advantage of this convention is that it becomes easier to reach minor-suit slams.

== Baron Notrump Overcall ==
A 1NT overcall is used over an opponent's opening suit bid to show a weak hand with support for the unbid suits and shortness in the opponent's suit, a doubleton at most. Maximum strength is thirteen points and the minimum depends on vulnerability and partnership agreement.

== Baron Two Notrump Response ==
When the opening is a bid of one of a suit, a 2NT response is given showing 16–18 points and a generally flat hand. 3NT shows 13–15 points. This is also known as the Two Notrump Forcing Response.

== Baron Two Spades and Three Spades ==
After a 1NT opening, a 2♠ response asks opener whether he is minimum or maximum for his bid. Opener responds 2NT with a minimum or at the three-level in his lowest four-card suit with a maximum. Responder may have one of two ranges: 11–12 points (looking for game in notrump) or 17–20 points (looking for slam in notrump or a minor suit). Similarly after a 2NT opening, 3♠ asks opener whether he is minimum or maximum, looking for a slam.
