= Five-card majors =

Contract bridge bidding treatment

Five-card majors is a contract bridge bidding treatment common to many modern bidding systems. Its basic tenet is that an opening bid of one-of-a-major in first and second position guarantees at least five cards in that major. This method has become standard in North American tournament play, but European methods vary.

== The concept ==
Typically when a bridge player makes a natural bid in a major suit (hearts or spades), he is promising at least four cards in that suit and asking partner if it will be an advantageous trump suit for the partnership. Because of the power of naming a trump suit with an eight-card fit, the responder with four or more cards of that suit will support his partners bid as if to say "we have found our eight-card fit."

If the opening bid promises five cards in the suit rather than just four, and responder holds three-card support, the 5-3 fit will be found immediately, rather than after opener's rebid. A 5-4 fit will also be found immediately, although a 4-4 fit will be found only after partner's first response. Since finding major suit fits is a high priority, making opening bids of 1♥ and 1♠ promise five cards rather than four is attractive.

=== Key advantages and disadvantages ===
Five-card major systems have the following advantages compared to four-card majors:

- 5-3 fits are found immediately, rather than after opener's rebid.
- If opponents overcall, responder knows definitely if there is a 5-3 major fit.
- If responder holds four-card support, he knows at once that there is a nine-card fit rather than just eight cards. This can be helpful in slam bidding or competitive bidding.

However, they have the following disadvantages compared to four-card majors (particularly where, in hands with a four-card major and a four-card minor, the major is opened):

- 4-4 major fits are not found immediately, though they will normally be found after responder's first bid.
- If opponents overcall, a 4-4 major fit could be lost. Negative doubles are essential to combat this.
- 4-4 major fits and some notrump contracts are more likely to be played "wrong-sided", by responder. This can be partly overcome by using Transfer Walsh responses over 1♣.
- Opening bids in a minor suit will sometimes need to be on less than four cards.

=== Additional considerations ===
With 13 cards in each suit, an eight-card fit implies that only five trump cards can be held by the opponents. They will most likely be distributed 3-2 or 2-3 among the opponents, so playing trump for three rounds will probably draw all trump cards from the opponents and leave two additional trump to be used separately for offensive purposes. However, if the trump cards break 4-1 or 1-4, then drawing trump will result in no trumps left for offensive purposes.

The value of five-card majors can be understood then on two levels:

- When partnerships have a 5-3 distribution in a major suit, the eight-card fit is easier for the player with the three cards to find. The strong preference to play duplicate bridge in the major suits at the game level makes the five-card major convention very attractive.
- When the trump suit can be declared with a 5-3 fit, then often one extra trick can be taken due to the extra trump card in declarer's hand because
  - if the opponent's five trump cards are distributed 3-2 or 2-3, then declarer will have two remaining trump cards to use in continuing play.
  - if the opponent's five trump cards are distributed 4-1 or 1-4, then declarer can pull trump for four rounds and still have one trump card in declarer's hand for continuing play.

But five-card majors have several drawbacks:

- Immediate 5-3 fits occur less frequently than immediate 4-4 fits (16.3% of the time versus 11.8%) reducing the probability of auctions such as 1♥ – 3♥
- Since playing 5-3 fits needs (at least) three turns to establish so there is often no trick gained by ruff in the short hand, while 4-4 fits can lend themselves to cross-ruff. In the 5-3 case, the two remaining established cards (assuming the opponents cards are 3-2 or 2-3) can also bring tricks in no trumps, if there is an entry to the hand which owns these cards.
- Immediate discovering of 5-4 fits is possible on one way with five-card majors, and on two ways with four-card majors.
- Hands with four-card majors and no five-card major are opened by one of a minor suit, which is less informative and more easily preempted by opponents than a four-card major opening.

== To play five-card majors ==
Both partners must agree to follow the five-card major bidding treatment on their opening bid. Opener must have at least five cards in hearts or spades to start the bidding with that suit. Responder is expected to show support with three-card support, indicating an eight-card fit. With only four cards in a major suit, the opening bidder is expected to open one of a minor suit (which may show less than four cards in that suit) or 1NT if in the agreed points range. After the opening bid, the five-card limitation is no longer in effect and any other bid typically promises only four cards as before.

Bridge partnerships who use five-card majors need some kind of short club opening bid. The most common practice is for 1♣ to promise at least a three-card club suit, indicating that opener has:

- at least 13 points and interest in winning the contract,
- no five-card major (else opener would have bid it, unless also holding a six-card or longer minor),
- no four-card diamond suit (else opener would have bid 1♦).

In this case, a 1♦ bid may also be on three cards, to cope with a 4-4-3-2 shape. This method is used in Standard American bidding. The alternative is for 1♦ to promise at least four cards, in which case the 1♣ opening may have to be made on a two-card suit.

There is strong pressure upon responder to bid a four-card major even after an intervening bid, or to show it indirectly by a negative double. In some methods, 1♣ – (1NT) – 2♥ as first response may promise only four hearts. Opening bidder will not raise the 2♥ bid with only three hearts.

Most bidding systems use five-card majors in conjunction with a strong no-trump. However, it is also possible to play it with a weak no-trump, as practiced by some club and tournament players in the United Kingdom. The most common strong no-trump opening range is 15-17 points, giving a risk that a 1♣ or 1♦ bid on 2 or 3 cards with 18-19 points could be passed out; an option would be to agree to open a 4 card major on these specific hands only, and rebid in NT.
