= Preempt =

Bid in contract bridge

Preempt (also spelled "pre-empt") is a bid in contract bridge whose primary objectives are (1) to thwart opponents' ability to bid to their best contract, with some safety, and (2) to fully describe one's hand to one's partner in a single bid. A preemptive bid is usually made by jumping, i.e. skipping one or more bidding levels. Since it deprives the opponents of the bidding space, it is expected that they will either find a wrong contract (too high or in a wrong denomination) of their own, or fail to find any. A preemptive bid often has the aim of a save, where a partnership bids a contract knowing it cannot be made, but assumes that (even when doubled), the penalty will still be smaller than the value of opponents' bid and made contract.

== Scoring context ==
Our Score If We Are Doubled and Defeated
When We are Not Vulnerable		When We are Vulnerable	
Undertricks	Score	Undertricks	Score
1	-100	1	-200
2	-300	2	-500
3	-500	3	-800
4	-800	4	-1100

Our Score If They Make Game
When They are Not Vulnerable	When They are Vulnerable
-400 in NT or -420 in a suit	-600 in NT or -620 in a suit

The tables at right help to illustrate the limits of the scoring advantage to be gained in duplicate bridge by preempting or sacrificing when the opponents may be successful in making a game contract. The level to which one may preempt, bid competitively or ultimately sacrifice is heavily influenced by the vulnerability status of each side and the assumption that the defending side will double the contract. There are four possible scenarios:

- Neither side is Vulnerable (equal vulnerability): The opponents are likely to score 400 or 420 points at game and a sacrifice bid which is defeated by no more than two tricks will lose at most 300 points.
- We are Not Vulnerable and They are (favorable vulnerability): The opponents are likely to score 600 or 620 points at game and a sacrifice bid which is defeated by no more than three tricks will lose at most 500 points.
- We are Vulnerable and They are not (unfavorable vulnerability): The opponents are likely to score 400 or 420 points at game and a sacrifice bid which is defeated by no more than one trick will lose at most 200 points.
- Both sides are Vulnerable (equal vulnerability): The opponents are likely to score 600 or 620 points at game and a sacrifice bid which is defeated by no more than two tricks will lose at most 500 points.

In summary, based upon the expectation that the opponents are likely to bid and make game, it is advantageous to preempt, compete or sacrifice for down three when vulnerability is favorable, down two when equal and down one when unfavorable.

== Preemptive openings ==
A preemptive opening bid is one made on the second or higher level, typically showing a weak hand containing a long, strong suit. Preemptive opening bids on the third or higher level are common for most bidding systems; for example, the hand of ♠ 4 ♥ KQJ9854 ♦ J62 ♣ 95 is a typical 3♥ opener. The bid is made on presumption that, without any additional tricks from the partner, at least six tricks can be taken with hearts as trump, and the potential penalty of 500 points in 3♥ doubled is smaller than the value or opponents' likely game or slam.

A preemptive opening bid usually shows at least six high card points and a suit with six or more cards headed by honors (typically either K-Q or better or Q-J-10 or better) but less than a normal opening bid. Some textbooks recommend the "rule of 2 and 3":"

Obviously, preempting at unfavorable vulnerability entails greater risk; such preempts, if ever, are often made with an intention of making the contract, and the long suit is often backed up by an unusual distribution, such as 7-4-2-0.

An alternative approach is to bid the level suggested by the Law of Total Tricks, with the assumption that partner's hand has one third of the remaining trumps. Using this approach,

- If playing "weak two bids" (now standard), bid at the "two" level with six cards of the suit (except in clubs),
- Bid at the "three" level with seven cards of the suit, and
- Bid at the "four" level with eight or nine cards of the suit.

Note that, in the "Weak Twos" convention, an opening bid of two clubs (2♣) is strong and artificial, typically showing at least 22 HCP, and thus is not available for preemption for hand with six clubs. Thus, some partnerships bid 3♣ with good preemptive hand (typically at least 8 HCP) that has only six clubs. Many partnerships that use an opening bid of 2♦ as a conventional bid will likewise bid 3♦ with a good preemptive hand that has only six diamonds.

Obviously, preempts in the fourth seat are very rare, as there is nobody to preempt: they do occur occasionally, though, e.g. when the player has a near-opening bid with a long suit, but is reluctant to open on level 1 for fear of being outbid by perceived opponents' major. For example, the hand ♠ 3 ♥ 94 ♦ KQJ963 ♣ AJ92 might reasonably open 3♦ in the fourth seat, hoping to silence the opponents' with their spades and/or hearts.

A preemptive bidder bids again only if his or her partner makes a conventional bid that requires a response.

Gambling 3NT opening bid is often used to preempt with a solid minor suit.

If Namyats is used, 4♣ and 4♦ are no longer available for preempts.

== Preemptive overcalls ==
A preemptive overcall is a jump overcall (so 2♦ is preemptive over 1♣ but not over 1♥) that is otherwise identical to a preemptive opening bid.

The suit requirements for preemptive overcalls are generally similar to a preemptive opening. However, they are normally loosened in third seat, when the partner has already passed, so the opening bidder can be sure that the only side preempted are the opponents, and thus can bid with better or thinner values.

== Other preempts ==
A partnership can preempt the opponents cooperatively, having discovered that they have an excellent suit fit but not much overall defensive strength. For example, after the partner opens 1♦ and RHO doubles, the following hand is suitable for a bid of 5♦, outbidding opponents' major suit game in advance:

♠ 83 ♥ 4 ♦ Q108542 ♣ QJ64

In a more general sense, even low-level and non-jump bids can have a preemptive value if they deprive the opponents of bidding suits that they could otherwise bid on level 1 or 2. For example, weak 1 notrump (characteristic for Acol system) opening takes up entire level 1 from the opponents, who could bid their long suit on level 1 had the opening been 1 of a minor, like in Standard American bidding. However, there is always the danger that the preempting side could preempt themselves, taking up their own bidding space that could be used for constructive bidding. For example, four-card major openings have a more preemptive effect compared with five-card major openings, but also carry less precise information, as the partner should not support the opened suit without at least 4 cards; that could result in missing a partial contract or even a game.

Many partnerships also use Michaels Cue Bids preemptively. A Michaels Cue Bid is a bid of two of a suit in which an opponent has bid one that promises two five-card suits including the unbid majors and, in most partnerships, at least seven or eight HCP. Thus, either 1♣-2♣ or 1♦-2♦ promises both five hearts and five spades, 1♥-2♥ promises five spades and either five clubs or five diamonds, and 1♠-2♠ promises five hearts and either five clubs or five diamonds. Over a Michaels Cue Bid in either major suit, partner's response of 2NT asks the Michaels bidder to bid the minor suit. If the Michaels bidder has a strong hand, the Michaels bidder can show the strength by rebidding an agreed suit at a higher level.

== Responses ==
Since the preempter has a weak hand, responder will pass most of the time. However, responder also has the following options:

- Raise opener's suit: Usually done to further the preempt with 3-card support (or jump with even more support), making it even more difficult for the opponents to compete. However, a raise to game can also be made with a good hand without support for opener if responder expects to make the contract. Opener must pass after any raise by partner.
- 2NT: Asking to further describe the hand (forcing). Opener bids a feature or rebids their suit with no further information
- 3NT: To play. Responder expects to make 9 tricks either by running partner's suit or his own. If responder expects to run opener's suit, support is needed as opener may not have outside entries to his hand. Also, responder should have stoppers in all suits.
- Bid a new suit below game: To play.

Over a preemptive opening bid or overcall at the "two" level, many partnerships use the 2NT response to ask for more information about the preemptive hand. In the Standard American Yellow Card (SAYC) bidding system, the preemptive bidder responds by bidding another suit containing an ace or a king or, lacking such a suit, by rebidding the suit of the preempt at the "three" level. In either case, the responder can then place the final contract.

The Ogust convention provides a more informative set of responses to the 2NT inquiry.

- 3♣ shows a "minimal" preempt (typically 6-7 HCP) and a "poor" suit.
- 3♦ shows a "minimal" preempt and a "good" suit.
- 3♥ shows a "strong" preempt (typically 8-10 HCP) and a "poor" suit.
- 3♠ shows a "strong" preempt and a "good" suit.
- 3NT shows that the preempt suit is "solid" (headed by AKQ).

The differentiation between "minimal" and "strong" preempts and between "poor" and "good" hands is a matter of partnership agreement, and typically depends upon the partnership's strictness in preemptive bidding. Partnerships that are very strict typically regard a suits with only two of the top three or three of the top four honors as "poor" while partnerships that preempt with poorer suits may regard such suits as "good." Hands that respond 3♦ or 3NT typically do not have outside entries, as their long suits contain nearly all of their high card points.

== The law of total tricks ==
Many players use the law of total tricks (often referred to as the "LAW") as a rule of thumb for preemptive and sacrificial bidding. Bids dictated by the LAW are often sacrificial, but nonetheless produce consistently better results with proper play. The LAW states:

"In a competitive auction, it is safe to bid a number of total tricks equal to the number of trumps in the combined hands of both partners."

When viewed in context of the Law of Total Tricks, normal preemptive opening bids, described above, basically assume that the preemptive bidder's partner possesses two of the five to seven outstanding cards of the long suit—mathematically, the "expected" number based on equiprobable distribution of the missing cards. Thus, the Law of Total Tricks implies that the preemptive opener's partner can safely raise the preemptive opening bid by the number of cards in excess of two in the named suit (for example, raise an opening bid of 3♥, which promises seven hearts, to 4♥ with three hearts (7+3=10 total tricks) or to 5♥ with four hearts (7+4=11 total tricks)), regardless of the responder's high card points.

The limit raises and preemptive raises of major suits in the Standard American Yellow Card bidding system also conform to the Law of Total Tricks. By opening a major suit normally, the opening bidder promises at least five cards of the major suit. A "limit" raise, which is a response of three of the opener's suit, requires ten to twelve high card points and four cards in the responder's suit, for a total of nine. Likewise, a preemptive raise, which is a bid of four of the opener's suit, requires five cards in that suit, for a total of ten. The Law of Total tricks allows the opening bidder to raise such responses by the number of cards in excess of five in that suit.

== See also ==
- Weak two bid
