= Standard American =

Bidding system for the bridge card game

Standard American is a bidding system for the game of bridge widely used in North America and elsewhere. Owing to the popularization of the game by Charles Goren in the 1940s and 1950s, its early versions were sometimes referred to simply as 'Goren'. With the addition and evolution of various treatments and conventions, it is now more generally referred to as Standard American. It is a bidding system based on five-card majors and a strong notrump; players may add conventions and refine the meanings of bids through partnership agreements summarized in their convention card. One standardised version, SAYC (Standard American Yellow Card), is widely used by casual partnerships and in online bridge.

== Role of bidding systems ==
The purpose of bidding during the auction phase of each deal is to disclose information which one's partner may employ in order to arrive at an optimal contract while concurrently contending with the opponents' attempts to do likewise. A bidding system is a set of agreements about the meanings of the different bids that the players use. Each bid provides information about the hand's high-card strength and suit distribution based on hand evaluation techniques.

== History ==
"Standard American" was the label given to the bridge bidding system developed by Charles Goren and his contemporaries in the 1940s. This system employed the 1915 point-count method to evaluate the strength of a bridge hand. Most bids had fairly specific requirements regarding hand strength and suit distribution. This point-count system became so popular that most bridge players, social and tournament players alike, used it. American bridge teams in the late 1930s and 1940s won world championships using Standard American.

Modifications began to appear from the 1950s forward. Before the year 2000, new bidding systems evolved, including "2/1 Game Forcing" which are otherwise substantial departures from early Standard American methods. Most tournament pairs now assemble their own system from a variety of new treatments and conventions that have evolved. The nearest thing to a common system in tournament play is the "Standard American Yellow Card" (SAYC) promulgated by the American Contract Bridge League. SAYC is widely used in internet bridge play, but only rarely in on-site tournament play.

== Most common elements ==
The essential common elements of modern Standard American systems are:

- Hand evaluation based on the 4-3-2-1 point count system (Ace = 4, King = 3, Queen = 2 and Jack = 1) with adjustments for the location of honors and suit distribution.
- A hand-strength requirement of at least 12-13 points to open 1-of-a-suit.
- Five-card majors: opening a major suit promises at least a five-card holding in that suit.
- Weak two bids: Two diamond, heart or spade openers are made with a sound six-card suit in a hand without enough overall strength to open 1 of the suit.
- Strong two clubs: All unbalanced hands too strong to open at the one-level are opened with an artificial 2♣ call, as well as balanced hands stronger than 21 HCP.
- Pre-emptive opening bids: Suit openings above the two level are pre-emptive, promising a long and strong suit.
- Limit Raises: A jump-raise of the opener's suit by responder, in the absence of opponent interference, is invitational to game. In Goren's system, this was a strong game-forcing raise.
- Notrump openers show a balanced hand, with the following common high card point (HCP) ranges:
  - 1NT = 15-17 HCP
  - 2NT = 20-21 HCP
  - 3NT = 25-27 HCP
- Common notrump follow-up conventions include Stayman, Jacoby transfers and Gerber.

== SAYC ==
The Standard American Yellow Card (SAYC) is a set of partnership agreements summarized in a convention card created by the American Contract Bridge League (ACBL) to be used as the required bidding system in specified events or as a base for a casual or online partnerships. Some of the specific agreements in Standard American Yellow Card (SAYC) that elaborate on or depart from more current Standard American bidding are:

- A 2♣ response to a 1NT opening is specified as the "non-forcing" version of the Stayman convention.
- A 2♠ response to a 1NT is a relay to the minors when responder holds a long (at least six card length) minor suit and a weak hand; opener bids 3♣ and responder either passes or corrects to 3♦ which opener is expected to pass.
- Straight Blackwood is used and not the Roman Key Card Blackwood or other variation.
- In response to a 2♣ opening, the 2♦ response is the "waiting" version of that response.
- In response to a weak-two opening, RONF ("Raise Only Non-Force") is used.
- The Jacoby 2NT is used to show a game-forcing raise of a major suit with four-card support.
- Negative doubles are used through the level of 2♠.
- Fourth suit forcing is used.
- Michaels cuebid and Unusual notrump are used.
- Conventions are specified as being "off" in response to a 1NT overcall, except that 2♣ is still Stayman.

== See also ==
- Glossary of contract bridge terms
- List of bridge books
