= Optimum contract and par contract =

Bridge scoring terms in the card game contract bridge

Optimum contract and par contract are two closely related (and sometimes confused) bridge scoring terms in the card game contract bridge.

== Optimum contract ==
The optimum contract is the one that offers the best chance of gaining the most scoring points whilst minimising the risk of failure. It is that contract that cannot be improved upon by further bidding nor could it have been improved upon by taking a different line in earlier bidding.

At Chicago or IMP scoring it is generally worth bidding game even with a slightly less than 50% chance of success due to the relatively high value of the bonuses (especially when vulnerable). In duplicate pairs scoring, the subtle difference between a major suit game, a NT game and a minor suit game make the declaration an important decision.

Each side has its own optimum contract and, for a side with poor hands, "pass" may be the optimum call.

== Par contract ==
Where there is competitive bidding (i.e. both sides are bidding) the extra dimension of sacrificial bidding is added, and the theoretical optimum contract can be overtaken by the par contract. The par contract on a deal is that contract that results from optimal bidding by both sides and that neither side could improve by further bidding. It will either be equal to the optimum contract of one side or it will exceed the optimum contract of both sides. If the latter, it is only considered par if the doubled penalty is less than the value of the opposing optimum contract.

== Par score or par result ==
The par result is that score that arises from the par contract and on which neither side could reasonably improve by changing their line of play. Game theoreticians would refer to such a par result as a Nash equilibrium.

The term par score originated in the game of golf.
