= Hand evaluation =

Bidding systems devised for contract bridge

In contract bridge, various bidding systems have been devised to enable partners to describe their hands so that they may reach the optimum contract. Key to this process is that players evaluate and re-evaluate the trick-taking potential of their hands as the auction proceeds and additional information about partner's hand and the opponent's hands becomes available.

Hand evaluation methods assess various features of a hand, including: its high card strength, shape or suit distribution, controls, fit with partner, quality of suits and quality of the whole hand. The methods range from basic to complex, requiring partners to have the same understandings and agreements about their application in their bidding system.

== Basic point-count system ==
Most bidding systems use a basic point-count system for hand evaluation using a combination of high card points and distributional points, as follows.

=== High card points ===
First published in 1915 by Bryant McCampbell in Auction Tactics (page 26), the 4-3-2-1 count for honours was not established by computer analysis (as is sometimes rumoured) but was derived from the game Auction Pitch. Although 'Robertson's Rule' for bidding (the 7-5-3 count) had been in use for more than a dozen years, McCampbell sought a more "simple scale of relative values. The Pitch Scale is the easiest to remember. (Those ... who have played Auction Pitch will have no difficulty in recognizing and remembering these values.)"

Called the Milton Work Point Count when popularized by him in the early Thirties and then the Goren Point Count when re-popularized by Work's disciple Charles Goren in the Fifties, and now known simply as the high-card point (HCP) count, this basic evaluation method assigns numeric values to the top four honour cards as follows:

- ace = 4 HCP
- king = 3 HCP
- queen = 2 HCP
- jack = 1 HCP

Evaluating a hand on this basis takes due account of the fact that there are 10 HCP in each suit and therefore 40 in the complete deck of cards. An average hand contains one quarter of the total, i.e. 10 HCP. The method has the dual benefits of simplicity and practicality, especially in notrump contracts. Most bidding systems are based upon the premise that a better than average hand is required to open the bidding; 12 HCP is generally considered the minimum for most opening bids.

==== Limitations ====
The combined HCP count between two balanced hands is generally considered to be a good indication, all else being equal, of the number of tricks likely to be made by the partnership. The rule of thumb for games and slams in notrump is as follows:

- 25 HCP are necessary for game, i.e. 3 NT
- 33 HCP are necessary for a small slam, i.e. 6 NT
- 37 HCP are necessary for a grand slam, i.e. 7 NT

A simple justification for 37 HCP being suitable for a grand slam is that it is the lowest number that guarantees the partnership holding all the aces. Similarly 33 HCP is the lowest number that guarantees at least three aces.

Although mostly effective for evaluating the combined trick-taking potential of two balanced hands played in notrump, even in this area of applicability the HCP is not infallible. Jeff Rubens gives the following example:

♠♤	A Q J 2	W E	♠♤	K 10 3
♥	A Q	W E	♥	K J 9 4
♦	K Q 3 2	W E	♦	A J
♣♧	A 4 3	W E	♣♧	8 7 6 5

♠♤	A Q J	W E	♠♤	K 10 3
♥	A Q 3 2	W E	♥	K J 9 4
♦	K Q	W E	♦	A J
♣♧	A 4 3 2	W E	♣♧	8 7 6 5

Both East hands are exactly the same, and both West hands have the same shape, the same HCP count, and the same high cards. The only difference between the West hands is that two low red cards and one low black card have been swapped (between the heart suit and the diamond suit, and between the spade suit and the club suit, respectively).

With a total of 34 HCP in the combined hands, based on the above-mentioned HCP-requirement for slam, most partnerships would end in a small slam (12 tricks) contract. Yet, the left layout produces 13 tricks in notrump, whilst the right layout on a diamond lead would fail to produce more than 10 tricks in notrump. In this case, the difference in trick-taking potential is due to duplication in the high card values: in the bottom layout the combined 20 HCP in spades and diamonds results in only five tricks. Because such duplication can often not be detected during bidding, the high card point method of hand evaluation, when used alone, provides only a preliminary estimate of the trick-taking potential of the combined hands and must be supplemented by other means for improved accuracy, particularly for unbalanced hands.

Accordingly, expert players use HCP as a starting point in the evaluation of their hands, and make adjustments based on:

- refinements to the HCP valuation for certain holdings,
- the use of additional point values for hand shape or distribution (known as distribution points), and
- bidding techniques to determine the specifics of any control cards held by partner.

Collectively, these more effectively evaluate the combined holdings of a partnership.

==== Refinements ====
For aces and tens

The 4-3-2-1 high card point evaluation has been found to statistically undervalue aces and tens and alternatives have been devised to increase a hand's HCP value.

To adjust for aces, Goren recommended deducting one HCP for a hand without any aces and adding one for holding four aces. Some adjust for tens by adding 1/2 HCP for each. Alternatively, some treat aces and tens as a group and add one HCP if the hand contains three or more aces and tens; Richard Pavlicek advocates adding one HCP if holding four or more aces and tens.

For unguarded honours

Goren and others recommend deducting one HCP for a singleton king, queen, or jack.

Alternative scale

Marty Bergen claims that with the help of computers, bridge theorists have devised a more accurate valuation of the honors as follows:

- ace = 4.5 HCP
- king = 3 HCP
- queen = 1.5 HCP
- jack = 0.75 HCP
- ten = 0.25

Note that this scale keeps the 40 high card point system intact. The scale may seem cumbersome, but if one considers the ace and ten honors "hard" and the queen and jack honors "soft" it is much easier to accurately count high card points by using the familiar 4-3-2-1 system and then adjusting. One can see that the ace and queen have something in common in that they are both "off" by a half point. The jack and ten are also both "off" by a quarter point. So for example, a hand with one of each honor (A, K, Q, J, 10) would be counted as 10 HCP. Since the hard and soft values are equal (the ace and queen cancel out, and the jack and ten cancel out), there is no adjustment. On the other hand, to take an extreme example, a hand with four aces and four tens (no kings, queens, or jacks) would be counted at 16 HCP at first, but since it holds eight hard values and no soft values, it is adjusted to 19 HCP.

Bergen's “computer” scale appears to be identical to the “high card value of the Four Aces System” found on the front inside cover and on page 5 of the 1935 book, The Four Aces System of Contract Bridge by (alphabetically) David Burnstine, Michael T. Gottlieb, Oswald Jacoby and Howard Schenken. The Four Aces' book (Jacoby may have written most or all of it) gives the simpler 3-2-1-1/2 version of the progression. Dividing Bergen's numbers by 1.5 produces exactly the same numbers published by the Four Aces seven decades earlier:

* Bergen ace   = 4.5 ÷ 1.5 = 3 Four Aces Count
* Bergen king  = 3.0 ÷ 1.5 = 2 Four Aces Count
* Bergen queen = 1.5 ÷ 1.5 = 1 Four Aces Count
* Bergen jack  = .75 ÷ 1.5 = ½ Four Aces Count 

— Q.E.D.

=== Distributional points ===
In order to improve the accuracy of the bidding process, the high card point count is supplemented by the evaluation of unbalanced or shapely hands using additional simple arithmetic methods. Two approaches are common – evaluation of suit length and evaluation of suit shortness.

==== Suit length points ====
At its simplest it is considered that long suits have a value beyond the HCP held: this can be turned into numbers on the following scale:

- 5-card suit = 1 point
- 6 card suit = 2 points
- 7 card suit = 3 points ... etc.

A hand comprising a 5-card suit and a 6-card suit gains points for both, i.e., 1 + 2 making 3 points in total. Other combinations are dealt with in a similar way. These distribution points (sometimes called length points) are added to the HCP to give the total point value of the hand. Confusion can arise because the term "points" can be used to mean either HCP, or HCP plus length points. This method, of valuing both honour cards and long suits, is suitable for use at the opening bid stage before a trump suit has been agreed. In the USA this method of combining HCP and long-card points is known as the point-count system.

==== Suit shortness points ====
Once a trump suit has been agreed, or at least a partial fit has been uncovered, it is argued by many that ruffing potential as represented by short suits becomes more significant than long suits. Accordingly, in a method devised by William Anderson of Toronto and popularized by Charles Goren, distribution points are added for shortage rather than length.

When the supporting hand holds three trumps, shortness is valued as follows:

- void = 3 points
- singleton = 2 points
- doubleton = 1 point

When the supporting hand holds four or more trumps, thereby having more spare trumps for ruffing, shortness is valued as follows:

- void = 5 points
- singleton = 3 points
- doubleton = 1 point

Shortage points (also known as support points or dummy points) are added to HCP to give total points.

==== Combination Count ====
This method uses both lengths and shortages in all situations. The hand scores two shortage points for a void and one for a singleton, and this total is added to the usual length count: one point is added for each card in a suit beyond four.

An alternative approach is to create a distributional point count of a hand to be added to HCP simply by adding the combined length of the two longest suits, subtracting the length of the shortest suit, and subtracting a further five. On this basis 4333 hands score -1 and all other shapes score a positive distributional count.

=== Summary ===
When intending to make a bid in a suit and there is no agreed upon trump suit, add high card points and length points to get the total point value of one's hand. When intending to raise an agreed trump suit, add high card points and shortness points. When making a bid in notrump with intent to play, value high-card points only.

== Supplementary methods ==
The basic point-count system does not solve all evaluation problems and in certain circumstances is supplemented by refinements to the HCP count or by additional methods.

=== Control count ===
The control count is a supplementary method that is mainly used in combination with HCP count to determine the trick-taking potential of fitting hands, in particular to investigate slam potential. The use of control count addresses the fact that for suit contracts, aces and kings tend to be undervalued in the standard 4–3–2–1 HCP scale; aces and kings allow declarer better control over the hands and can prevent the opponents from retaining or gaining the lead.

The control count is the sum of the controls where aces are valued as two controls, kings as one control and queens and jacks as zero. This control count can be used as "tie-breakers" for hands evaluated as marginal by their HCP count. Hands with the same shape and the same HCP can have markedly different slam potential depending on the control count.

♠♤	K J 6 3 2	W E	♠♤	A Q 9 8 5
♥	A 2	W E	♥	K 5 3
♦	7 5 4 3	W E	♦	A 6
♣♧	A 5	W E	♣♧	K 4 3

♠♤	K J 6 3 2	W E	♠♤	A Q 9 8 5
♥	A 2	W E	♥	K Q 3
♦	7 5 4 3	W E	♦	Q 6
♣♧	A 5	W E	♣♧	K 4 3

In the above examples, both West hands are the same, and both East hands have the same shape and HCP (16). Yet, the layout on the left represents a solid slam (12 tricks) in spades, whilst the layout on the right will fail to produce 12 tricks. The difference between the East hands becomes apparent when conducting a control count: in the top layout East has two aces and two kings for a total of six controls, whilst in the bottom layout has one ace and two kings for a total of four controls.

HCP	Expected Controls
5	1
7–8	2
10	3
12–13	4
15	5
17–18	6
20	7

The interpretation of the significance of the control count is based upon a publication by George Rosenkranz in the December 1974 issue of The Bridge World. Rosenkranz defined "the expected number of controls in balanced hands" at specific HCP counts as 'control-neutral' in a table similar to the consolidation shown on the left; having more controls is deemed 'control-rich' and having less is 'control-weak'.

The table can be used as tie-breaker for estimating the slam-going potential of hands like the above two East hands. Whilst the top East hand counts 16 HCP, in terms of controls (6) it is equivalent to a hand typically 1–2 HCP stronger, whereas the bottom East hand, also counting 16 HCP, is in terms of controls (4) more equivalent to 12–13 HCP.

If West opens the bidding with 1♠, both East hands should aim for at least game (4♠), the partnership having the minimum 26 total points typically required for a game contract in the majors. Despite the spade suit fit, both East hands have marginal slam potential based on their 16 HCP count alone. On the top layout the control-rich East (an upgraded 17–18 HCP) should explore slam and be willing to bypass 4♠ in doing so, whilst on the bottom layout the control-weak East (a downgraded 12–13 HCP) should be more cautious and be prepared to stop in 4♠ should further bidding reveal West lacking a control in diamonds.

Having determined the degree of interest in exploring slam possibilities, the methods and conventions to determine which controls (aces, kings and even queens) are held by the partnership include: the Blackwood convention, the Norman four notrump convention, the Roman Key Card Blackwood convention and cuebids.

In his book "The Modern Losing Trick Count", Ron Klinger advocates the use of the control count to make adjustments to the LTC hand evaluation method (see below).

=== Negative/positive features ===
Certain combinations of cards have higher or lower trick taking potential than the simple point count methods would suggest. Proponents of this idea suggest that HCP should be deducted from hands where negative combinations occur. Similarly, additional points might be added where positive combinations occur. This method is particularly useful in making difficult decisions on marginal hands, especially for overcalling and in competitive bidding situations. In lieu of arithmetic addition or subtraction of HCP or distributional points, 'plus' or 'minus' valuations may be applied to influence the decision.

Negative features worth less than the HCP suggest:

- Honour doubletons K-Q, Q-J. Q-x, J-x unless in partners suit. Although Samuel Stayman recommended deducting one HCP for K-Q, K-J, Q-J,Q-x,J-x Q-x-x, J-x-x holdings, this is now considered extreme.
- Honour singletons; some exempt the singleton ace but others consider it inflexible in play.
- Honour combinations not accompanied by a small card.
- Honours in opponents' suit when deciding to support partner's suit.
- Honours in side suits when deciding to overcall.
- The club suit when opening because it allows opponents to overcall more easily.
- The next suit above RHO's suit when overcalling (unless a very good suit) which gives opponents information but does not cut into their bidding space.
- Honours in suits shown by LHO.

Positive features worth more than the HCP suggest:

- Honours in long suits.
- Two or three honours in long suits (better).
- Honour sequences in long suits (best).
- Honours in partner's suit when deciding to support it.
- Honours in own suit when deciding to overcall.
- Two or three intermediate cards in a suit (8, 9 10) especially if headed by honours.
- The spade suit when opening ... makes overcalling more difficult.
- The next suit below RHO's suit when overcalling reduces the opponents' bidding space.
- Honours in suits shown by RHO.

=== Defensive/attacking values ===
Certain combinations of cards are better in defence and others are more valuable in attack (i.e. as declarer). There is some overlap with the concept of negative and positive points.

Defensive values that suggest a hand should defend:

- Honours in shortish side suits, e.g. Kxx.
- Honours and/or length in opponents suit.
- Lack of honours in own suit.

Attacking values that suggest a hand should play a contract as declarer or dummy:

- Honours in own suit (the more the better).
- Lack of defensive values.

This concept is sometimes stated as the "Offence-Defence Ratio" (ODR) of a hand. For example, a suit KQJ10987 will take 6 tricks with this as the trump suit but maybe none in defence; it has a high ODR. If the same cards are randomly scattered through different suits, they are about equally likely to take tricks in attack or defence. Point count or the Losing Trick Count indicate how many tricks a hand is likely to make in offence; a hand with high ODR will tend to be more distributional, with lower HCP, and take less tricks in defence than a hand with the same number of losers but a low ODR. There is no precise numerical statement of the ODR.

== Methods to help with opening bids and overcalls on marginal hands ==
=== Rule of 22 ===
Add together the number of HCP in the hand, and the number of cards in the two longest suits, and the number of quick tricks in the hand. If the resultant number is 22 or higher, then an opening bid is suggested [the choice of which bid depends on partnership agreement]. In 3rd seat the requirement may be lowered to 19. Quick tricks are: AK=2, AQ=1.5, A=1, KQ=1, Kx[x]=0.5 [singleton K=0]. This formula for evaluating opening bid strength is referred to by Ron Klinger as "Highly Cutie" [HI-LE QT]: HIgh card points + LEngth count + Quick Tricks. The method attempts to improve the widely accepted 'Rule of 20' by emphasizing the importance of defensive values in a one-level opening hand, and by assigning greater value to honor cards that work together in the same suit than to honors that are split between suits.

=== Rule of 20 ===
Add together the number of HCP in the hand, and the number of cards in the two longest suits. If the resultant number is 20 or higher and most of the high cards are in the long suits, then an opening bid is suggested (the choice of which bid requires further analysis). As an example, a hand containing 11 HCP and 5–4–2–2 shape would qualify for an opening bid because the resultant number would be 20 (11 + 5 + 4) whereas 11 HCP and 4–4–3–2 shape would not (11 + 4 + 4 = 19). This method gives very similar results to length points as above except for a hand containing 11 HCP and 5–3–3–2 shape which gives 19 on the Rule of 20 (insufficient to open) but 12 total points by adding 1 length point to the 11 HCP (sufficient to open). Experience and further analysis are needed to decide which is appropriate.

=== Rule of 19 ===
Identical to the Rule of 20 but some expert players believe that 20 is too limiting a barrier and prefer 19.

=== Suit Quality Test (SQT) ===
The SQT evaluates an individual suit as a precursor to deciding whether, and at what level, certain bids should be made. This method is generally considered useful for making an overcall and for making a preemptive opening bid; it works for long suits i.e. 5 cards at least, as follows: Add together the number of cards in the suit and the number of high (honour) cards in the suit. For this purpose high cards are considered to be A, K, Q, J and 10 but the J and 10 are only to be counted if at least one of the A, K or Q are present. The resultant number determines the level at which the particular bid should be made (Klinger 1994) according to this scale:

- 7 = a one level bid
- 8 = a two level bid
- 9 = a three level bid .... etc.

An alternative way to look at this is that the bid should be to the level of the number of tricks equal to the SQT number. This method was originally proposed as a way of enabling overcalls to be made with relatively few HCP but with little risk. It can also be used to determine whether a hand is suitable for a preemptive bid.

== Methods to help when a fit has been discovered ==
Paraphrasing Crowhurst and Kambites (1992), "Experts often sail into an unbeatable slam with only 25 HCP whereas it would never occur to most players to proceed beyond game".

North	South
1♠	3♦
4♦	4♠
?	

For example, holding ♠ K109864 ♥ A43 ♦ KQ8 ♣ 4 with the auction shown on the left, they point out that the bidding indicates at least 6/3 in spades and 5/3 in diamonds. If partner has 3 aces (easily discovered), a grand slam (13 tricks: 6♠, 1♥, 5♦, 1♣) is likely. This grand slam can easily be bid despite the partnership holding around 29 HCP only (12 in hand above plus 17 in the hand bidding the jump shift (1♠ – 3♦)). At lower levels it is harder to be as precise but Crowhust & Kambites advise "With a good fit bid aggressively but with a misfit be cautious". Some of the methods that follow are designed to use arithmetic in the evaluation of hands that fit with partner's.

=== Losing-Trick Count (LTC) ===
Once a trump fit has been found, this alternative (to HCP) method is used in situations where shape and fit are of more significance than HCP in determining the optimum level of a suit contract. The "losing-tricks" in a hand are added to the systemically assumed losing tricks in partners hand (7 for an opening bid of 1 of a suit) and the resultant number is deducted from 24; the net figure is the number of tricks a partnership can expect to win when playing in the agreed trump suit.

The basic method assumes that an ace will never be a loser, nor will a king in a 2+ card suit, nor a queen in a 3+ card suit, thus

- a void = 0 losing tricks.
- a singleton other than an A = 1 losing trick.
- a doubleton AK = 0, Ax or KQ = 1, Kx = 1 1/2, xx = 2 losing tricks.
- a three card suit AKQ = 0, AKx = 1/2, AQx = 1, KQx = 1 1/2 losing trick.
- a three card suit Axx = 1 1/2, Kxx = 2, Qxx = 2 1/2, xxx = 3 losing tricks.
- suits longer than three cards are judged according to the three highest cards; no suit may have more than 3 losing tricks.

A typical opening hand, e.g. ♠ AKxxx ♥ Axxx ♦ Qx ♣ xx, has 7 losers (1+2+2+2=7). To calculate how high to bid, responder adds the number of losers in their hand to the assumed number in opener's hand (7). The total number of losers is subtracted from 24. The answer is the total number of tricks available to the partnership, and this should be the next bid by responder. Thus following an opening bid of 1♥:

- partner jumps to game with no more than 7 losers in hand and a fit with partner's heart suit (3 if playing 5-card majors) ... 7 + 7 = 14 subtract from 24 = 10 tricks.
- With 8 losers in hand and a fit, responder bids 3♥ (8+7=15 which deducted from 24 = 9 tricks).
- With 9 losers and a fit, responder bids 2♥.
- With only 5 losers and a fit, a slam is likely so responder may bid straight to 6♥ if preemptive bidding seems appropriate or take a slower forcing approach.

=== LTC refined ===
Thinking that the method tended to overvalue unsupported queens and undervalue supported jacks, Eric Crowhurst and Andrew Kambites refined the scale, as have others:

- AQ doubleton = 1/2 loser according to Ron Klinger.
- Kx doubleton = 1 1/2 losers according to others.
- AQJ = 1/2 loser ... not one.
- KQJ = 1 loser.
- AJ10 = 1 loser according to Harrison-Gray.
- KJ10 = 1 1/2 losers according to Bernard Magee.
- QJ10 = 2 losers.
- Qxx = 3 losers (or possibly 2.5) unless trumps, or unless partner has bid the suit.
- Subtract a loser if there is a known 9-card trump fit.

In his book The Modern Losing Trick Count, Ron Klinger advocates adjusting the number of loser based on the control count of the hand believing that the basic method undervalues an ace but overvalues a queen and undervalues short honor combinations such as Qx or a singleton king. Also it places no value on cards jack or lower.

Bernard Magee also points out that the LTC can overvalue doubletons. A hand with two doubletons will usually have more immediate losers than one with a singleton and 3 cards in the other suit. The older "shortage points" method values the second hand type higher.

=== New Losing Trick Count (NLTC) ===
Main article New Losing Trick Count

Extending these thoughts, most experts agree that basic LTC undervalues Aces and overvalues Queens. In addition, many believe that worthless singletons and doubletons are generally overvalued. Recent insights on these issues have led to the New Losing Trick Count (The Bridge World, May 2003). For more precision, this method utilizes the concept of half-losers and, more important, distinguishes between 'Ace-losers', 'King-losers' and 'Queen-losers.' Considering only the three highest ranking cards in each suit:

- missing Ace = three half-losers (1.5 losers)
- missing King = two half-losers (1.0 loser)
- missing Queen = one half-loser (0.5 losers)

Adopters of NLTC should note that all singletons, except singleton A, are counted as three half-losers (1.5 losers), and all doubletons that are missing both the A and K are counted as five half-losers (2.5 losers). Like basic LTC, no suit contains more than three losers, so with NLTC, three small cards in a suit are counted as six half-losers (3.0 losers).

A typical opening bid is assumed to have 15 or fewer half-losers, or 7.5 losers, which is half a loser more compared to basic LTC. NLTC also differs from LTC in the fact that it utilises a value of 25 (instead of 24 with basic LTC) in determining the trick-taking potential of two partnering hands. Hence, in NLTC the expected number of tricks equates to 25 minus the sum of the losers in the two hands (i.e. half the sum of the half-losers in both hands). So, 15 half-losers opposite 15 half-losers leads to 25-(15+15)/2 = 10 tricks.

Similar to basic LTC, users may employ an alternative formula to determine the appropriate contract level. The NLTC alternative formula is 19 (instead of 18 with basic LTC) minus the sum of the losers in the two hands (i.e. half the sum of the half-losers in both hands) = the suggested contract level to which the partnership should bid. So, 15 half-losers opposite 15 half-losers leads to 19-(15+15)/2 = 4-level contract. Players already familiar with this formula will recognize the difference between 25 (total projected tricks) and 19 (projected contract level) as the number of tricks required by declarer to secure a "book", which is 6.

There is no evidence that this method is better than the original losing trick count.

=== Law of Total Tricks, Total Trumps Principle, TNT (Total Number of Trumps = Total Number of Tricks) ===
For shapely hands where a trump fit has been agreed, the combined length of the trump suit can be more significant than points or HCP in deciding on the level of the final contract. It is of most value in competitive bidding situations where the HCP are divided roughly equally between the partnerships.

- Bridge: TNT and Competitive Bidding (1981) was probably the first major book on this topic. In the introduction the authors acknowledge Jean-René Vernes as the first writer to delve into the TNT (Total Number of Tricks) Theory. This book and these authors are little known in North America. What a shame! They touch several aspects of TNT that are rarely mentioned by others. Chapter Four on Total Distribution is worth the price (if you can locate a used copy of this out-of-print book). Page 19 carries a key table that may not be printed elsewhere.
- The Law of Total Tricks states that "On every hand of bridge, the total number of tricks available is equal to, or very close to, the total number of cards in each side's longest suit". Total tricks is defined as the sum of the number of tricks available to each side if they could choose trumps.
- The Total Trumps Principle is derived from the Law of Total Tricks and argues that this is more often than not a winning strategy, "Bid to the contract equal to the number of trumps you and your partner hold (and no higher) in a competitive auction".
- In 2002, Anders Wirgren called the accuracy of the "law" into question, saying it works on only 40% of deals. However, Larry Cohen remains convinced it is a useful guideline, especially when adjustments are used properly. Mendelson (1998) finds that it is "accurate to within one trick on the vast majority of hands"

== Methods to help with strong hands ==
Hands with relatively solid long suits have a trick taking potential not easily measured by the basic pointcount methods (e.g. a hand containing 13 spades will take all 13 tricks if spades are trumps, but will only score 19 on the point count method, 10 HCP + 9 length point). For such hands, playing tricks is deemed more suitable. Responding to such hands is best made considering quick tricks.

=== Quick Tricks ===
Quick tricks are similar to, but not the same as, Honor Tricks in the Culbertson system. They are calculated suit by suit as follows:

- 2 quick tricks = AK of the same suit
- 1 1/2 quick tricks = AQ in the same suit
- 1 quick trick = A
- 1 quick trick = KQ in the same suit
- 1/2 quick trick = Kx (not K singleton)

This method is used when replying to very strong suit opening bids such as the Acol 2♣ where 1 1/2 quick tricks are needed to make a positive response (Klinger 1994).

=== Playing Tricks ===
For relatively strong hands containing long suits (e.g. an Acol 2 opener), playing tricks are defined as the number of tricks expected, with no help from partner, given that the longest suit is trumps. Thus for long suits the ace, king and queen are counted together with all cards in excess of 3 in the suit; for short suits only clear winner combinations are counted:

- A = 1, AK = 2, AKQ = 3
- KQ = 1, KQJ = 2

An Acol strong 2 of a suit opening bid is made on 8 playing tricks (Landy 1998)

== More advanced methods ==
=== Zar Points ===
This statistically derived method for evaluating Contract Bridge hands was developed by Zar Petkov. It attempts to account for many of the factors outlined above in a numerical way.

=== Visualisation ===
A key differentiator between the bidding effectiveness of experts versus laymen is the use of hand visualisation during all stages of bidding.

In his book The Secrets of Winning Bridge, Jeff Rubens advises to focus on just a few hands that partner might be holding, and more particularly on perfect minimum hands compatible with the bidding. This means that in order to reach an informed decision in, for example, deciding whether a hand is worth an invitation to game or slam, a player should 'visualise' the most balanced distribution with the minimum HCP partner might have with the high cards selected such that these fit precisely with your own hand. He advises that "your hand is worth an invitation to game (or slam) if this perfect minimum holding for partner will make it a laydown".

Rubens gives the following example:

♠ QJ2 ♥ A32 ♦ KQJ54 ♣ A3

Partner opens 1♠. A minimum hand compatible with the bidding would have no more than 12 HCP, and be relatively balanced (i.e. 5332). The hand would be perfect if partner's points were solely located in spades and diamond. So a perfect minimum would be:

♠ AK543 ♥ 654 ♦ A2 ♣ 542

Such a perfect minimum would give a solid slam in spades whereas reliance on HCP would not indicate a slam possibility. This is the advantage of the 'visualisation' method.
