= Bridge convention =

Artificial call made during the auction in a game of contract bridge

In contract bridge, a convention is an agreement about an artificial call or a set of related artificial calls. Calls made during the auction phase of a contract bridge game convey information about the player's card holdings. Calls may be "natural" (that is, are based on a holding of the suit bid, or a balanced distribution in the case of a notrump bid) or "artificial" (show a feature unrelated to the named denomination).

== Purpose ==
Contract bridge is a trick-taking card game played by four players in two competing partnerships in which a sequence of bidding, also known as the auction, precedes the play of the cards. The purpose of this bidding is for players to inform their partners of the content of their hand and to arrive at a suitable contract at which to play the hand (or to prevent the opponents from arriving at a suitable contract). Although bidding is often "natural" (describing a hand by simple reference to possession, shape, and strength of the named suit), players may also bid using conventions, which assign more specific information to certain calls, particularly at the more advanced levels of competitive play. Bill Root defines "convention" as, "A specific agreement between partners to give an unusual meaning to a bid". However, some conventions, for example, Stayman, are very widely used and cannot be said to be unusual.

Conventions are often named after their ostensive author (the Drury convention), their promulgator (the Stayman convention), or the methodology itself (the strong two clubs convention).

The term conventional is also used to describe certain opening leads, discards and signals that have specific agreed meanings.

Conventions to be played must be agreed by partners before play begins and must be disclosed to their opponents, either in advance by the use of convention cards or by alerts, announcements, and answers to questions about one's partner's bids once bidding has begun. Generally, this disclosure also must include the negative implications of choosing the bid over another alternative. Failure to reveal fully the existence and meaning of a convention generally constitutes an illegal communication of information between partners.

Perhaps the most widely known and used conventions are Blackwood, which asks for and gives information about the number of aces and kings held, Stayman convention, used to discover a 4-4 fit in a major suit following an opening no trump bid, Jacoby transfers, used to find a 5-3 fit in a major suit, and strong two clubs to show a very strong hand (usually at least 22 HCP). It could be argued that takeout doubles are conventional but their usage is so widespread that they may be considered a natural call.

== Classification ==
Bridge conventions can be classified according to their purpose:

- Opening bid conventions
  - Strong opening bids are used for hands stronger than the "normal" opening bid range (12-20 points in natural systems, 12-15/17 points in artificial systems)
    - Strong two clubs in natural systems denote hands of 22+ high card points
    - Benjamin Twos in natural systems
    - Strong one club in strong club systems denotes hands of 16-17+ points
  - Weak opening bids are used for hands weaker than the normal opening bid range, but with preemptive value:
    - Standard preemptive bids, including "weak two" Bids
    - Kamikaze 1NT
    - Ekren
    - Muiderberg
  - Other opening bid conventions:
    - Flannery
    - Multi 2 diamonds
    - Namyats
- Fit-seeking conventions are used in constructive bidding, in order to find a fit—a suit suitable to be a trump suit
  - Baron
  - Checkback Stayman
  - Forcing notrump
  - Jacoby transfers
  - New minor forcing
  - Stayman
  - Bergen raises
  - LTC
  - Jacoby 2NT (also known as Stenberg 2NT)
- Slam-seeking conventions are used in constructive bidding to investigate the possibility of a slam contract
  - Asking bids
  - Blackwood
  - Cue bids
  - Gerber
  - Grand slam force
  - Last Train
  - Quantitative notrump bids
  - Relay bids
  - Splinter bid
  - Serious 3NT
- Defensive conventions or interventions are used to show a specific type of hand after the opponents have opened the bidding
  - Takeout double
  - Unassuming Cue Bid in reply to overcalls
  - Lebensohl over weak two bids
  - Defenses over 1 NT, including two- and multi-suited overcalls:
    - Astro, Aspro, Asptro
    - Cappelletti
    - CoCa
    - CRASH
    - DONT
    - Hamilton
    - Landy
    - Lionel
    - Meckwell
    - Multi-defense
    - Multi-Landy
    - Suction
  - Two-suited overcalls over suit openings, like
    - Copenhagen convention
    - CRO
    - Ghestem
    - Leaping Michaels
    - Michaels cuebid
    - Raptor convention
    - Roman two-suiters
    - Unusual notrump
- Counter-interventions present a countermeasure after opponents' conventional and natural interventions:
  - Lebensohl
  - Negative double
  - Negative free bid
  - Rubensohl
  - Unusual vs. unusual
- Other:
  - Game trial bids
  - Lightner double
  - Texas transfer

== Regulations ==
Under the rules of the sponsoring organization (for example national federations such as American Contract Bridge League (ACBL) and the English Bridge Union (EBU), zonal organizations, and the World Bridge Federation (WBF)), certain conventions are alertable, the partner of the player making the conventional call must say "alert" (or show an alert card from the bidding box) before the right-hand opponent calls. The right-hand opponent may ask the alerter about the meaning of the convention, or may proceed as usual. If the right-hand opponent does not ask about the convention, their partner may do so when it is their turn. Under ACBL and EBU rules, some conventions are also announced, for example Jacoby transfers. When a player makes a transfer bid, his or her partner must say, "transfer" (or, under EBU rules, state the suit in question).

Sponsoring organizations can require players at all or some levels of competition to have a convention card which is a form completed by the partnership, containing general notes of the system, together with the definition of conventional bids, leads, discards and signals. In ACBL-sanctioned games, all pairs are obliged to have such a card, which must be identical for both members of the partnership. On the ACBL convention card, alertable conventions are shown in red and announceable ones in blue.

Sponsoring organizations may also ban the usage of certain conventions or restrict their use to certain levels of competition; examples are the use of "ambiguous" suits to disrupt opponent's bidding. WBF classifies most "strong pass" and "either-or" methods into so-called HUM (highly unusual methods) and brown sticker conventions, and restricts their usage on WBF-sponsored events. Other zonal and national organizations often do the same. In general, ACBL tends to be more restrictive in allowed usage of conventions than European organizations.

== See also ==
- Glossary of contract bridge terms
- Bidding system
- Signal (bridge)

== Bibliography ==
- Andersen, Ron (1987). The Lebensohl Convention Complete in Contract Bridge. Louisville, KY: Devyn Press, Inc. p. 103. ISBN 0-910791-82-1.
- De Satnick, Shelly (1984). Everyone's Introduction to Bridge Conventions. New York: Avon. p. 137. ISBN 978-0-380-89318-8.
- Granovetter, Matthew; Granovetter, Pamela (2003). Bridge Conventions in Depth. Toronto: Master Point Press. p. 290. ISBN 1-894154-56-8.
- Grant, Audrey (2000). Commonly Used Conventions. Memphis, TN: American Contract Bridge League. p. 359. ISBN 978-0-943855-14-1.
- Grant, Audrey (2001). More Commonly Used Conventions. Memphis, TN: American Contract Bridge League. p. 395. ISBN 978-0-943855-15-8.
- Horton, Mark (2000). Simple Conventions. How to Play Bridge Series. NTC Publishing Group. pp. 96. ISBN 978-0-8442-2223-3.
- Kearse, Amalya (1990). Bridge Convention Complete (Revised and Expanded ed.). Louisville, KY: Devyn Press, Inc. p. 1121. ISBN 0-910791-76-7.
- Klinger, Ron (1993). Bridge Conventions, Defenses and Countermeasures. London: Victor Gallancz in association with Peter Crawley. p. 143. ISBN 0-575-05564-2.
- Klinger, Ron; Kambites, Andrew (2001). Bridge Conventions For You (Revised & enlarged ed.). London: Cassell, in association with Peter Crawley. p. 144. ISBN 978-0-304-35795-6.
- Landy, Sandra; Horton, Mark; Seagram, Barbara (2006). 25 Bridge Conventions for ACOL Players. Toronto: Master Point Press. p. 208. ISBN 978-1-897106-14-3.
- Lederer, Rhoda (1982). Bridge Conventions Made Clear (3rd ed.). Hounslow, England: Bibliagora. ISBN 978-0-906031-37-7.
- Lindkvist, Magnus (2001). Bridge: Classic and Modern Conventions. Bucharest, Romania. ISBN 91-631-1099-7.
- Root, William; Pavlicek, Richard (1981). Modern Bridge Conventions. New York: Crown Trade Paperbacks. ISBN 0-517-58727-0.
- Seagram, Barbara; Smith, Marc (1999). 25 Bridge Conventions You Should Know. Toronto: Master Point Press. pp. 190. ISBN 1-894154-07-X.
- Seagram, Barbara; Bird, David (2003). 25 More Bridge Conventions You Should Know. Toronto: Master Point Press. pp. 210. ISBN 1-894154-65-7.
- Senior, Brian (2001). Bridge Conventions Today. Better Bridge Now. London: Chess & Bridge Limited. p. 127. ISBN 0-9530218-1-5.
