= Comfy Canapé =

Conventional defense in the card game bridge

In the card game bridge, CoCa or Comfy Canapé is a conventional defense against opposing 1NT openings. When playing CoCa, over a 1NT opening of the opponents, both a double as well as a 2♣ overcall are conventional and establish spades and hearts, respectively as anchor suits. Higher overcalls (2♦/♥/♠) can be either natural (single suiters), or conventional (as explained below).

The convention was published in Bridge Magazine IMP.

== CoCa overcalls ==
dbl = A) 4-card spades plus a longer suit, or B) 6-card spades

2♣ = A) 4-card hearts plus a longer suit, or B) 6-card hearts

2♦ = 4-4 majors

2♥ = 5-card plus minor suit

2♠ = 5-card plus minor suit

The canapé structure of the dbl/2♣ CoCa bids (with a rebid in another suit denoting a longer suit) is what lends the convention its name.

== Responses ==
Following the CoCa double, the partner of the doubler responds as follows:

(1NT) - dbl - (pass) - ??

pass = hand suitable for defense (usually denies spades)

2♣ = pass-or-correct bid, denies 4-card spades (doubler to pass or bid longer suit)

2♦ = pass-or-correct bid, denies 4-card spades, hand suitable for conversion to 3♣ (doubler to pass or bid longer suit)

2♥ = pass-or-correct bid, denies 4-card spades, hand suitable for conversion to 3♣/♦ (doubler to pass or bid longer suit)

2♠ = spade fit

Similar responses apply to a 2♣ overcall:

(1NT) - 2♣ - (pass) - ??

Pass = to play

2♦ = pass-or-correct bid, denies 4-card hearts (doubler to pass or bid longer suit)

2♥ = heart fit

2♠ = to play

== Advantages/disadvantages ==
CoCa renders all unbalanced hands with a major suit biddable. Claimed advantage of CoCa over other conventional defenses to 1NT openings, is that the first CoCa bid establishes at least one major anchor suit. Obviously, this advantage can turn into a disadvantage in cases knowledge of this anchor suit helps the opponents with a key decision during play.

Furthermore, for nine out of the twelve frequently occurring 5-4 two suiters, the structure of the CoCa-overcalls allows the partnership to sign-off in the longer suit at the two level. Moreover, for five of these 5-4 hands, also the 4-card is known to partner before the bidding goes beyond that suit at the two-level. As a result, the treatment minimises the chance of ending up in a Moysian (4-3) fit whilst a better (5-3) fit is available.

Like using Brozel, Lionel and DONT, using CoCa carries the consequence of losing the penalty double over opponent's 1NT. Although this is sometimes seen as a loss, the inventor of the Lionel convention, Lionel Wright, argues that this loss turns into an advantage as it opens the possibility to defend 1NT doubled with split points between both defending partners. As a balanced holding of the majority of points is far more likely to occur than holding the majority of points in an imbalanced way, a conventional non-penalty double over 1NT holds the potential of paying-off on many hands. Also, non-penalty doubles are more difficult to deal with than traditional business doubles.

== See also ==
- Canapé
- List of defenses to 1NT
