= Boring Club =

Bidding system in the card game contract bridge

The Boring Club (Dutch: Saaie klaver) is a bidding system in the card game contract bridge, designed by Lucas Smid of the Netherlands. In this system all balanced ('boring') hands, that in most natural systems would be opened 1NT or would be opened in a suit at one level with the plan to rebid 1NT or 2NT, must be opened with 1♣. The general idea behind this system is to get the information about the shape of the hand (balanced or unbalanced) across to partner in the first bid.

The opening bids in boring club can be summarised as follows:

- 1♣: Balanced (12-18 hcp), no five card major
- 1♦: 4+♦, unbalanced (10-21 hcp)
- 1♥: 5+♥ (10-21 hcp)
- 1♠: 5+♠ (10-21 hcp)
- 1NT: 5+♣ (10+ hcp)
- 2♣: Balanced (19-22 hcp), may contain five card major
- 2♦: Multi (including 23+ NT and game forcing hands)
- 2♥: Muiderberg convention
- 2♠: Muiderberg convention
- 2NT: Two suiter in both minors with longer clubs (10-15 hcp)

== The 1♣ opening ==
A boring club 1♣ opening shows 12-18 high card points in a balanced hand not containing a five card major. This opening bid is non-forcing with transfer responses:

1♣ - ??

Pass: 4+♣, 0-6 hcp
1♦: 4+♥, 7+ hcp
1♥: 4+♠, 7+ hcp
1♠: puppet, forces opener to rebid 1NT
1NT: balanced, no four card major, 8-10 hcp
2♣: 4+♣, no four card major, 10+ hcp (Inverted minors)
2♦: 5+♦, no four card major, 10+ hcp

== The 1NT opening ==
In boring club, the unbalanced hands that in a natural system would have been opened 1♣, get opened with a forcing 1NT opening. The following responses apply:

1NT - ??

2♣: 0-10 hcp, not necessarily ♣-support
2♦: no five card major, 10+ hcp
2♥: 5+♥, 10+ hcp
2♠: 5+♠, 10+ hcp
2NT: ♣-fit, 10+ hcp
3♣: ♣-fit, weak (5-9 hcp)
