= Astro convention =

Contract bridge bidding convention

Astro is a contract bridge bidding convention used to intervene over an opponent's one notrump (1NT) opening bid. The name is derived from the initials of the surnames of its inventors - Paul Allinger, Roger Stern and Lawrence Rosler.

Astro employs a 2-level overcall in a minor suit when intervenor holds an unbalanced hand with at least nine cards in two suits, at least one of which is a major; hand strength should be unsuitable for, or not strong enough for a penalty double, typically no more than 15 points. The minor suit overcalls are artificial and carry the following meanings:

- 2♣ shows at least 5-4 or 4-5 length in hearts and a minor suit, and
- 2♦ shows at least 5-4 or 4-5 length in spades and another suit.

When playing Astro but not holding the prescribed two-suited hand, the following calls are available over the 1NT opening by the opponents:

- an overcall of 2♥ or 2♠ is natural showing a single-suited hand
- Double is for penalties

== Subsequent bidding ==
For purposes of subsequent bidding, the major suit indicated by the Astro Intervenor is termed the “anchor major”; the cheapest unbid suit is called the "neutral" suit. Depending upon action taken by the responder to the 1NT opener, Advancer may:

- Pass when weak and holding six cards in the minor bid by the Intervenor, or
- Raise the anchor major: (a) to the 2 level with at least 3-card support, preferably with an honour, and no game intentions, or (b) raise to the 3 level with at least 4-card support and inviting game, cognizant of vulnerability and the point range of the 1NT opening, or (c) raise to the 4 level with at least 4-card support for game-try, or
- Bid an artificial and forcing 2NT to show some support in the anchor suit, game interest but no potential to bid further, or
- Bid a new suit take-out or new suit jump, to show a 6-card or longer suit, or
- Make a negative bid of 2 in the neutral suit to indicate having no other options, usually less than 3 cards headed by an honour in the anchor suit and at least a doubleton in the neutral suit.

Intervenor rebids include:

- Pass after a neutral response with five cards in the neutral suit, or
- a bid of the anchor major to show 5 cards, or
- a bid of the second suit at the 3-level to show 6 cards and good playing strength.

== Variations ==
In the following variations of Astro, the overcalls indicate more specific information about suit combinations:

=== Modified Astro ===
- 2♣ shows a long heart suit with or without a long minor
- 2♦ shows spades and a minor suit
- 2♥ shows hearts and spades

=== Pinpoint Astro ===
- 2♣ shows hearts and clubs
- 2♦ shows hearts and diamonds
- 2♥ shows hearts and spades
- 2♠ shows spades and a minor suit
- 2NT shows both minors

=== Roth-Stone Astro ===
- 2♣ shows clubs and spades
- 2♦ shows diamonds and spades
- 3♣ shows clubs and hearts
- 3♦ shows diamonds and hearts
- Double shows hearts and spades against a strong 1NT opening; against a weak 1NT, it is penalty oriented showing at least 15 high card points.

Also, Aspro and Asptro are very similar to Astro, but handle the hands with both majors slightly differently.

== Defense against Astro ==
Responder to the 1NT opener may:

- Double with holdings in the anchor suit and in the minor overcalled, or
- Cuebid the anchor suit when the hand is unsuited to defense, or
- Pass, waiting, or
- Bid a natural 2NT, invitational to game.

== Alternative conventions ==
Several other bidding conventions use a variety of schemes to compete against a 1NT opening; these include: Aspro, Asptro, Brozel, Cappelletti, DONT, Landy and Ripstra.
