= Hello convention =

Hello is a bridge convention used for intervention over an opponent's 1NT opening. It allows for all one- and two-suited hands to be shown, and - for one suited hands - retains the ability to transfer.

== History ==
The name of the convention is derived from the names two of its inventors, Jerry Helms and Bill Lohmann. Jerry Helms had previously co-developed "Helms", similar to the Cappelletti convention and saw this as an improvement to that convention. Helms considered that using 2♣ to show a major used up no bidding space and therefore lost the preemptive value typically attached to bidding major suits.

== Description ==
It features the following calls:

- Double is for penalty
- 2♣ shows diamonds or a major-minor two suiter. Responder transfers to 2♦ which is either passed or advanced (diamond suit) or a major is bid (2 suiter, unspecified minor)
- 2♦ is a transfer to hearts
- 2♥ shows both majors (responder may pass or correct to 2♠)
- 2♠ shows spades (natural bid)
- 2NT is a transfer to clubs
- 3♣ shows both minors (responder may pass or adjust to 3♦)
- 3♦ shows both Majors with massive playing strength (responder takes a preference to 3♥ or 3♠, or jumps to 4♥ or 4♠ with supporting values)

By design, in many cases, the advancer will become declarer, thus placing the strong 1NT hand on opening lead.

== See also ==
- List of defenses to 1NT
