= Leaping Michaels =

In the game of bridge, Leaping Michaels is a conventional overcall in 4♣ or 4♦ made in defense to opposing 2-level or 3-level preemptive openings. A variant of the Michaels cuebid, Leaping Michaels shows a strong two-suited hand (5-5 or longer) that is less suitable for a takeout double and is game forcing. Described as an overcall by some of a weak two-bid of a major, others expand its application to all weak preempts at the 2 or 3-level in both the majors and minors.

Holding such two-suited hands and using Leaping Michaels, opponent's opening preempts between 2♦ and 3♠ inclusive are overcalled in accordance with the following table:

Opener's preempt	Overcaller's use of Leaping Michaels	
Opener's preempt	Bid	Meaning: overcaller is two-suited in...
2♦ or 3♦	4♣	Clubs and an undisclosed major
2♦ or 3♦	4♦	Majors
2♥ or 3♥	4♣	Clubs and spades
2♥ or 3♥	4♦	Diamonds and spades
2♠ or 3♠	4♣	Clubs and hearts
2♠ or 3♠	4♦	Diamonds and hearts
3♣	4♣	Majors
3♣	4♦	Diamonds and an undisclosed major

After (3♦) – 4♣, a bid of 4♦ asks for the major. The bids 4♥ and 4♠ are to play.

Following (3♣) – 4♦ the bid of 4♥ is played as pass-or-correct.

Some partnerships prefer to interchange the meanings of the 4♣ and 4♦ bids following a 3♣ preempt so that 4♣ denotes diamonds and an undisclosed major. This has the advantage that the 4♦ becomes available to ask for the major suit. The 4♥/4♠ responses can then be played as natural (to play).

Leaping Michaels can be utilised after natural two-level preempts, but also after conventional preempts such as Muiderberg. Even after a Multi 2 diamonds preempt, Leaping Michaels can be utilised to good effect:

(2♦) – 4♣ : Clubs and an undisclosed major (4♦ asks for the major)
(2♦) – 4♦ : Diamonds and an undisclosed major (4♥ is pass-or-correct)
