= Mini-Roman 2 Diamond =

Contract bridge convention

Mini-Roman or Mini-Roman 2 Diamonds is contract bridge convention whereby the opening bid of 2♦ shows a three suited hand and 11-15 high card points (HCP). The convention is meant to help responder to judge, more quickly, the right level of the contract and the best trump suit (or if notrump would be better).

== History ==
The Roman Club system, developed in the 1950s, included a treatment of these three suited hands with 2♣ showing a weaker hand and 2♦ a stronger hand. A response by partner of 2NT was forcing to game.

The Blue Club system of bidding was developed and became widely popular in the 1960s and included a 2♦ bid to show a 4-4-4-1 hand with 17-24 HCP

== Description ==
An opening bid of 2♦ shows one of two distributions: 4-4-4-1 or 5-4-4-0 (the five card suit is usually not a major suit) and 11-15 HCP

The Mini-Roman 2♦ opening is a forcing bid. Responder has the following options.

- 2♥: Pass or correct and non-forcing;
- 2♠: Pass or correct to 3♣ and non-forcing;
- 2NT: Forcing, asking opener to bid his short suit.
- 3♥ or ♠ showing a long suit and interest in game in that suit or notrump if Opener is near the top of the bid.

Opener's rebids:

- Over 2♥: pass or bid 2♠;
- Over 2♠: with hearts, bid 3♣, pass with spades;
- Over 2NT bid the short suit:

The advantage to the system is the power of the short suit. The hand lends itself to a cross ruff.

A disadvantage is the loss of the 2♦ bid for other purposes including a weak 2, a Strong two or a Multi 2♦.

== Variations ==
There is a wide range of variations available to this convention (usually subject to partnership agreement) and these include:

- The singleton or void will always be in a minor suit. This allows for an easy exit at the two level, should responder not have many points.
- The opener shows the singleton or void by bidding the suit under it (3N = ♣). This is sometimes referred to as the submarine treatment.
- The convention is not used when holding a singleton spade

== See also ==
- Multi two diamonds
- Weak two bid
