= Lebensohl =

Contract bridge convention

Lebensohl is a contract bridge convention whose variants can be used in the following situations:

- by responder after an opponent's overcall of a one notrump (1NT) opening bid in order to compete further in the auction without necessarily committing the partnership to game.
- after opponents' weak-two bids and
- in responding to a reverse by partner.

== Origins and spelling ==
The origins of the convention are unknown and various views about its spelling have ensued.

The Official Encyclopedia of Bridge (OEB) first listed LEBENSOHL in its third edition published in 1976 and attributed its design to George Boehm; the fourth OEB edition, under the entry LEBENSOLD, states that George Boehm first described the convention and that Boehm had wrongly attributed it to Ken Lebensold; the fifth and sixth editions state likewise but under LEBENSOHL. In the seventh edition and for the first time, the OEB notes "Uniquely amongst bridge conventions, it should arguably be spelled with a lowercase first letter – lebensohl."

In another account, Lebensohl is said to have been observed in use in the late 1960s and...

...thought to be the brainchild of Kenneth Lebensold (whose name had been misspelled). However, Lebensold emphatically denied any part of the convention's development. For lack of a better name, George Boehm appropriated the misspelling and introduced "lebensohl" in The Bridge World, (November, 1970).

— Ron Andersen, The Lebensohl Convention Complete in Contract Bridge (1987) p. 7

The November 1970 Bridge World article by Boehm was the first published on Lebensohl but he does not attribute the convention to Ken Lebensold in it. However, Boehm does recount that in preparation for a competition in New York in late 1969, his convention card had the entry "Lebensohl when you overcall our notrump opening". Ken Lebensold was also a competitor at the event and upon reviewing Boehm's convention card, "disowned the convention". Boehm goes on to state that therefore he and his playing partner (son, Augie) "have decided to designate it "lebensohl" and to continue to use it without fee or license". Notwithstanding Boehm naming and spelling it uncapitalized, most bridge literature refers to the convention as Lebensohl with occasional post-1970 use of Lebensold going uncorrected.

== After an overcall of a 1NT opening ==
Lebensohl can be initiated by Responder after partner has opened 1NT and right hand opponent (RHO) has overcalled 2♦ or 2♥ or 2♠:

Responder's Bid	Meaning and Subsequent Bidding
2 of a higher ranking suit than overcaller's	Natural and non-forcing.
2NT	A puppet bid (sometimes incorrectly called a “relay bid”), requiring opener to bid 3♣. After opener's forced 3♣ bid: 3 of a lower ranking suit than overcaller's is natural, to play.; 3 of a higher ranking suit than overcaller's is natural and invitational.; 3 of overcaller's suit is artificial: like Stayman, it asks opener to bid a 4-card major, but it also shows^{†} a stopper in overcaller's suit.; 3NT is natural, to play, and shows^{†} a stopper in overcaller's suit.
3 of a suit other than overcaller’s	Natural, forcing to game.
3 of overcaller’s suit	Artificial: like Stayman, it asks opener to bid a 4-card major, but it also denies^{†} a stopper in overcaller's suit.
3NT	Natural, to play, and denies^{†} a stopper in overcaller's suit.

^{†}These explanations assume the most common partnership agreement that “slow shows”, i.e., that the slower sequences, which start with 2NT, show a stopper in overcaller’s suit, while the more direct sequences deny a stopper. This is sometimes alternatively described as FADS - fast arrival denies stopper. Some partnerships adopt the opposite agreement (“slow denies” and "fast shows" a stopper).

=== Double of the overcall ===
Responder's double is not part of lebensohl. Historically a double in this spot indicated "penalty", however modern methods use it for a Negative double since a 4-card major hand with 4+ hcp occurs far more frequently than a penalty double hand. This assignment also simplifies the lebensohl system by making its Game Force Stayman cuebid unnecessary.

== Other applications ==
=== After a Weak-two ===
After a Weak Two opening is doubled for takeout, there's not enough ladder room for Advancer's natural bids to convey critical information to Doubler. Lebensohl solves this problem by restoring all the necessary bid messages.

Example 1: After (2♠) – Dbl – (P):

- With 0-7 points 2NT is bid forcing a relay of 3♣. This is either passed or corrected to another suit.
- With 8-11 points suits are bid at the 3 level.
- With values for game and 5+ hearts, bid 4♥. Partner should have 3+ hearts for their double.
- With values for game and 4 hearts, bid 3♠. With a spade stopper, bid 2NT first.
- With values for game and 0-3 hearts, bid 3NT. With a spade stopper, bid 2NT first.

Example 2: There is space to bid a suit at the 2 level; e.g. after (2♥) – Dbl – (P) and the suit held is spades:

- With 0-7 points and 4+ spades bid 2♠
- With 8-11 points and FOUR spade cards, 2NT is bid forcing a relay of 3♣. Then 3♠ is bid.
- With 8-11 points and FIVE+ spade cards, 3♠ is bid.
- With values for game and 5+ spades, bid 4♠. Partner should have 3+ spades for their double.
- With values for game and 4 spades, bid 3♥. With a heart stopper, bid 2NT first.
- With values for game and 0-3 spades, bid 3NT. With a heart stopper, bid 2NT first.

With a very strong hand (typically 20+ points) the doubler can by-pass 3♣.

=== After a major is raised to the two level ===
The same scheme can be played after the sequence: (1M) – P – (2M) – Dbl; (P) – ? or (1M) – Dbl – (2M) – ?

=== After a non-game-forcing reverse ===
After the sequence 1♦ – (P) – 1♠ – (P); 2♥ – (P) – ?:

- 2♠ shows a weak hand with spades
- 2NT shows a minimum hand and forces 3♣. Preference is usually then given for opener's suits.
- Any other bid is now game forcing.

This has the effect of saving space when responder wants to force game and show support. A disadvantage is that responder cannot stop in 2NT with a misfit.

== See also ==
- Rubinsohl
- Blackout convention
