= Mohan convention =

Mohan is a bridge convention used to intervene over opponents' 1NT opening. Typically it only applies if the opponents are using a weak 1NT opening (where 15 points or less is the maximum). Its invention is usually attributed to John Mohan.

Over 1NT:

- Double shows 14+ points, and is often left in for penalty. If it is not, the advancer (partner of doubler) bids as though his partner had opened 1NT. (Stayman and Jacoby transfers apply, for example).
- 2♣ shows both majors, possibly 5-4. If responder does not have a preference, he bids 2♦ to let opener pick.
- 2♦ is a transfer to hearts,
- 2♥ is a transfer to spades,
- 2♠ shows spades and a minor,
- 2NT shows hearts and a minor,
- 3 of a minor shows a long minor and is constructive,
- 3 of a major is pre-emptive.

== See also ==
- List of defenses to 1NT
