= Lionel convention =

Lionel is a contract bridge bidding convention used in defense against an opposing 1NT openings. Using Lionel, over a 1NT opening of the opponents:

- a double is conventional and denotes spades and a lower suit (4-4 or longer),
- a 2♣/2♦ overcall denotes hearts and the suit bid (4-4 or longer), and
- a 2♥/2♠ overcalls is natural.

Any of the overcalls denote high-card strength corresponding to 12+ (or good 11) high card points.

The convention is named after Lionel Wright from New Zealand who published it in the International Popular Bridge Monthly magazine of May 1993.

== Responses ==
Following the Lionel double, the partner of the double responds as follows:

(1NT) - dbl - (pass) - ??

pass = 10+ hcp, all subsequent doubles for penalty

2♣ = pass-or-correct bid (doubler to pass or bid second suit)

2♦ = Non-forcing, diamond length (typically 5+) with heart tolerance. Doubler can bid 2♥ with hearts as second suit and less than two diamonds.

2♥ = Natural, non-forcing

2♠ = Weak Raise

2NT = Invitational spade raise without a singleton side suit

3♣/♦/♥ = Invitational spade raise with singleton or void in bid suit

3♠ = preemptive raise

After a minor suit Lionel overcall, the responses are straightforward. For instance:

(1NT) - 2♣ - (pass) - ??

Pass = to play

2♦ = to play

2♥ = weak raise

2♠ = to play

2NT = invitational heart raise

3♣ = preemptive

3♥ = preemptive

== Advantages/disadvantages ==
Like using Brozel, CoCa or DONT, using Lionel has the consequence of losing the penalty double over opponent's 1NT. Although this is often seen as a loss, Lionel Wright argued that this loss turns into an advantage as it opens the possibility to defend 1NT doubled with split points between you and your partner. As a balanced holding of the majority of points is far more likely to occur than holding the majority of points in an imbalanced way, a conventional non-penalty double over 1NT holds the potential of paying-off on many hands. Also, non-penalty doubles are more difficult to deal with than traditional business doubles.

== See also ==
- List of defenses to 1NT
