= Woolsey convention =

Convention in contract bridge

This article describes the contract bridge bidding convention.

Devised by Kit Woolsey, the convention is a defense against an opponent's one notrump opening; especially used at matchpoints. Initial bids are as follows:

Initial Call	Meaning
Double	Promises a four-card major and a longer minor. Advancer can bid 2♣ to ask for the minor (pass or correct), 2♦ to ask for the major, or 2♥ or 2♠ to play.
2♣	Promises both majors. Advancer can bid 2♦ to ask which is better, so the overcaller's 2♣ bid can freely be made with 5-4 shape.
2♦	Promises one of the major suits.
2♥/2♠	At least 5–5 in the named major and a minor. 2NT by Advancer asks for the minor.
2NT	Promises both minors.
3 of any suit	Natural.

The convention has similarities to Multi-Landy.

== Abuses ==
Common abuses as described by Kit Woolsey include:

- 3-1=4-5 distributional hands in the balancing seat regularly double, even with no 4-card major suit.
- Strong hands, with 19 high card points plus, start with a double and then rebid 2 Notrump (or double) to try to expose a psychic bid.
- Good 4-4=4-1 distributional hands with a stiff minor suit can start with 2♣.
- Single-suited minor hands often start with double, hoping to be able to play at the two-level. These hands will pass a 2♦ asking bid.

== See also ==
- List of defenses to 1NT
