= Rubinsohl =

Bridge convention

Rubinsohl (also referred to as Rubensohl) is a bridge convention that can be used to counter an opponent's intervention over a 1NT opening bid. After the opponent's two-level overcall, all bids starting from 2NT are transfer bids to the next strain.

== Origins ==
The concept was introduced by Bruce Neill of Australia in a Bridge World magazine article in May 1983. Because he had based his concept on earlier work by Jeff Rubens on Rubens Advances and on Lebensohl, Neill named the treatment Rubensohl. However, from the fifth edition in 1994 onwards, The Official Encyclopedia of Bridge notes that Ira Rubin of the United States had devised similar methods earlier to replace Lebensohl and "...so Rubinsohl seems the appropriate name".

== Applications ==
When playing Rubinsohl, the following applies after an opposing 2♦ (natural) overcall over the partner's 1NT opening:

1NT - (2♦) - ??

dbl : penalty
2♥/♠ : to play
2NT : transfer to 3♣
3♣ : transfer to opponent's suit -> asks for four card major
3♦ : transfer to hearts (at least invitational)
3♥ : transfer to spades (at least invitational)
3♠ : transfer to 3NT -> game values but no major suit and no stopper in opponent's suit
3NT : to play

Similar schedules apply following a natural two-level overcall in any of the other suits.

Unlike Lebensohl, the partner of the 1NT opener can always indicate his long suit at the first bid; this can be advantageous in competitive auctions.

The same transfer schedule can also be used following a conventional overcall over 1NT as long as this overcall indicates an anchor suit. For instance: following an Asptro 2♣ overcall (showing ♥ and another suit) over partner's 1NT opening, the bids 2NT, 3♣ and 3♥ would be transfers to the next strain, whilst 3♦ would be an asking bid.

Partnerships that have agreed to use Rubinsohl often extend its use to include responses to a partner's takeout double over an opposing weak two opening. For instance:

(2♥) - dbl - (pass) - ??

pass = penalty
2♠ : to play
2NT : transfer to clubs (weak or strong)
3♣ : transfer to diamonds (weak or strong)
3♦ : asking bid (looking for 4 card spade suit)
3♥ : transfer to spades (at least invitational)
3♠ : transfer to 3NT -> game values but no major suit and no stopper in opponent's suit
3NT : to play

== See also ==
- Lebensohl
