= Suction convention =

Tactic used in Bridge

Suction is a contract bridge bidding convention used to intervene over an opponent's 1NT opening. Using the suction convention, a suit overcall of a 1NT opening is conventional and denies the suit actually bid. It shows either:

1. a one-suiter in the next higher ranking suit or
2. a two suiter in the other two suits.

The overcall bids are summarized as follows:

Opener	Overcaller	
Opener	Bid	Meaning
1NT	2♣	diamonds, or hearts and spades (i.e. both majors)
1NT	2♦	hearts, or spades and clubs (i.e. both black suits)
1NT	2♥	spades, or clubs and diamonds (i.e. both minors)
1NT	2♠	clubs, or diamonds and hearts (i.e. both red suits)

If responder passes, advancer is required to bid the next higher ranking suit. If overcaller has the one-suited hand, he passes. Otherwise, he bids yet the next higher suit, showing that suit plus the remaining, unbid suit. Advancer then takes a preference by passing or bidding the remaining suit.

Optionally additional overcalls are available to show the two non-touching suit pairs in the foregoing table – namely clubs with hearts and diamonds with spades. The first pair are referred to as the 'rounded' suits and the other as the 'pointed' suits owing to the shape of the tops of their pips. A call of 'Double' would show clubs and hearts (the rounded suits) and a call of 2NT would show diamonds and spades (the pointed suits). This requires the penalty double to be abandoned; if not abandoned, 2NT would show either non-touching pair, requiring identification.

== Use as pre-empts ==
Suction bids can be used as pre-empts, giving a way of opening many weak hand types cheaply. Responder bids the next suit up with a weak or non-descript hand, and makes any other bid to force for one round. These mean forgoing the artificial 2♣ opening, so work best in a strong club context. This has the advantage that one can use the same structure for weak 2 openings, a defence to 1NT and (at the 1-level, with a "Double" replacing 2♣) a defence to a strong 1C opening.

== Restricted use ==
Suction is not permitted in events governed by the ACBL General convention chart, except as a defense to artificial opening bids (such as Precision, strong 2♣ openings, Flannery, etc.). [This restriction has been lifted for the ACBL Open and Open+ events as of May 2023. Reference: https://web2.acbl.org/documentLibrary/about/Convention-Charts.pdf]

== See also ==
- List of defenses to 1NT
