= CRASH convention =

Contract bridge convention

In the game of contract bridge, CRASH (an acronym for Color-RAnk-SHape) is a defense against a strong club systems (bid of 1♣) or a 1NT opening that first appeared in 1976 in an article by Kit Woolsey in The Bridge World. Within the CRASH framework, intervening calls after the 1NT opening denote either (a) two-suited hands of the same color (black or red), the same rank (major or minor), or the same shape (pointed or rounded) or (b) a natural one-suited hand (hearts or spades).

Over a 1NT opening, the following CRASH overcall structure applies:

Opener	Intervenor	
Opener	Call	Meaning
1NT	Double	two suits of the same color, i.e. either the black suits (♠+♣) or the red suits (♥+♦)
1NT	2♣	two suits of the same rank, i.e. either the majors (♠+♥) or the minors (♣+♦)
1NT	2♦	two suits of the same shape, i.e. either the rounded suits (♣+♥) or the pointed suits (♠+♦)
1NT	2♥	a natural heart suit
1NT	2♠	a natural spade suit

Following the two-suited overcalls, advancer will bid taking into account that out of the two possible two-suited hands of intervenor, the likely holding is in advancer's shortest suits. The responses are therefore convertible. For instance, following a CRASH double, an advancer holding ♠ 1075 ♥ Q9842 ♦ KJ6 ♣ K3 will start from the assumption that intervenor holds length in the black suits in which advancer's maximum length is three cards, rather than in the red suits in which his maximum length is five cards. Advancer will therefore bid 2♠, his best black suit. Intervenor will pass holding the black suits, or bid 3♦ holding the red suits. In case of the latter, advancer will correct to 3♥ since that is his best red suit.

== Variations ==
Other defenses similar to CRASH, with the bids in a different order, include KOSHER and SHAKER.

In the American Contract Bridge League (ACBL) General Convention Chart, the double and the 2♣ overcall are allowed, but the 2♦ overcall must promise at least one known suit. In these events, pairs may use a CRASH variation with 2♦ showing the majors, such as either "CHASM" (color, shape, majors) or "SCUM" (shape, color, majors).

== See also ==
- List of defenses to 1NT
