= One suiter =

Hand in contract bridge, a card game

A bridge hand showing a single suiter in spades. Note that this hand has three cards in clubs.

In contract bridge, a one suiter is a hand containing at least six cards in one suit. Many hand patterns can be classified as one suiters. Typical examples are 6-3-2-2, 6-3-3-1 and 7-3-2-1 distribution.

One suiters form the cornerstone of preemptive bidding. Weak one suiters with six card length are traditionally opened preemptively at the two level, whilst seven carders are used to preempt at the three level. The modern trend is to lower these minimum length requirements, especially when non-vulnerable. Conventional preemptive openings used to introduce a weak one suited hand include the multi 2 diamonds and the gambling 3NT conventions.

Over an opposing opening, one suiters are usually introduced via a natural overcall. But see also list of defenses to 1NT.

== See also ==
- Two suiter
- Three suiter
- Balanced hand
- Preempt
