= Contract bridge probabilities =

Mathematical probabilities in the game of bridge

In the game of bridge mathematical probabilities play a significant role. Different declarer play strategies lead to success depending on the distribution of opponent's cards. To decide which strategy has highest likelihood of success, the declarer needs to have at least an elementary knowledge of probabilities.

The tables below specify the various prior probabilities, i.e. the probabilities in the absence of any further information. During bidding and play, more information about the hands becomes available, allowing players to improve their probability estimates.

== Probability of suit distributions (for missing trumps, etc.) in two hidden hands ==
This table represents the different ways that two to eight particular cards may be distributed, or may lie or split, between two unknown 13-card hands (before the bidding and play, or a priori).

The table also shows the number of combinations of particular cards that match any numerical split and the probabilities for each combination.

These probabilities follow directly from the law of Vacant Places.

Number of cards (trumps, etc.) missing from partnership	Distribution	Probability	Combinations	Individual Probability
2	1 - 1	0.52	2	0.26
2	2 - 0	0.48	2	0.24
3	2 - 1	0.78	6	0.13
3	3 - 0	0.22	2	0.11
4	2 - 2	0.40	6	0.0678~
4	3 - 1	0.50	8	0.0622~
4	4 - 0	0.10	2	0.0478~
5	3 - 2	0.68	20	0.0339~
5	4 - 1	0.28	10	0.02826~
5	5 - 0	0.04	2	0.01956~
6	3 - 3	0.36	20	0.01776~
6	4 - 2	0.48	30	0.01615~
6	5 - 1	0.15	12	0.01211~
6	6 - 0	0.01	2	0.00745~
7	4 - 3	0.62	70	0.00888~
7	5 - 2	0.30	42	0.00727~
7	6 - 1	0.07	14	0.00484~
7	7 - 0	0.01	2	0.00261~
8	4 - 4	0.33	70	0.00467~
8	5 - 3	0.47	112	0.00421~
8	6 - 2	0.17	56	0.00306~
8	7 - 1	0.03	16	0.00178~
8	8 - 0	0.00	2	0.00082~

=== Calculation of probabilities ===
Let $P'(a, b, n_e, n_w)$ be the probability of an East player with $n_e$ unknown cards holding $a$ cards in a given suit and a West player with $n_w$ unknown cards holding $b$ cards in the given suit. The total number of arrangements of $(a+b)$ cards in the suit in $(n_e + n_w)$ spaces is $T = \frac{(n_e + n_w)!}{(n_e + n_w - a - b)!(a + b)!}$ i.e. the number of permutations of $(n_e + n_w)$ objects of which cards in the suit are indistinguishable and cards not in the suit are indistinguishable. The number of arrangements of which correspond to East having $a$ cards in the suit and West $b$ cards in the suit is given by $S = \frac{n_e!}{a!(n_e - a)!} \times \frac{n_w!}{b!(n_w - b)!}$. Therefore,
$$P'(a, b, n_e, n_w) = \frac{S}{T} = \frac{(a+b)!}{a!b!} \times \frac{n_e!n_w!(n_e + n_w - a - b)!}{(n_e+n_w)!(n_e - a)! (n_w - b)!} = \binom{a+b}{a}\frac{n_e!n_w!(n_e + n_w - a - b)!}{(n_e+n_w)!(n_e - a)! (n_w - b)!}=\frac{\binom{a+b}{a}\binom{n_e+n_w-a-b}{n_e-a}}{\binom{n_e+n_w}{n_e}}$$
If the direction of the split is unimportant (it is only required that the split be $a$-$b$, not that East is specifically required to hold $a$ cards), then the overall probability is given by
$$P(a, b, n_e, n_w) = P'(a, b, n_e, n_w) + (1-\delta_{a, b})P'(b, a, n_e, n_w)$$
where the Kronecker delta ensures that the situation where East and West have the same number of cards in the suit is not counted twice.

The above probabilities assume $n_e = n_w = 13$ and that the direction of the split is unimportant, and so are given by
$$P(a, b) = P(a, b, 13, 13) = \binom{a+b}{a}\frac{13!13!(26-a-b)!}{26!(13-a)!(13-b)!}(2-\delta_{a,b})$$
The more general formula can be used to calculate the probability of a suit breaking if a player is known to have cards in another suit from e.g. the bidding. Suppose East is known to have 7 spades from the bidding and after seeing dummy you deduce West to hold 2 spades; then if your two lines of play are to hope either for diamonds 5-3 or clubs 4-2, the a priori probabilities are 47% and 48% respectively but $P(5, 3, 13-7, 13-2) \thickapprox 42\%$ and $P(4, 2, 13-7, 13-2) \thickapprox 47\%$ so now the club line is significantly better than the diamond line.

== Probability of HCP distribution ==
High card points (HCP) are usually counted using the Milton Work scale of 4/3/2/1 points for each Ace/King/Queen/Jack respectively. The a priori probabilities that a given hand contains no more than a specified number of HCP is given in the table below. To find the likelihood of a certain point range, one simply subtracts the two relevant cumulative probabilities. So, the likelihood of being dealt a 12-19 HCP hand (ranges inclusive) is the probability of having at most 19 HCP minus the probability of having at most 11 HCP, or: 0.9855 − 0.6518 = 0.3337.

HCP	Probability	HCP	Probability	HCP	Probability	HCP	Probability	HCP	Probability
0	0.003639	8	0.374768	16	0.935520	24	0.999542	32	1.000000
1	0.011523	9	0.468331	17	0.959137	25	0.999806	33	1.000000
2	0.025085	10	0.562382	18	0.975187	26	0.999923	34	1.000000
3	0.049708	11	0.651828	19	0.985549	27	0.999972	35	1.000000
4	0.088163	12	0.732097	20	0.991985	28	0.999990	36	1.000000
5	0.140025	13	0.801240	21	0.995763	29	0.999997	37	1.000000
6	0.205565	14	0.858174	22	0.997864	30	0.999999		
7	0.285846	15	0.902410	23	0.998983	31	1.000000		

== Hand pattern probabilities ==
A hand pattern denotes the distribution of the thirteen cards in a hand over the four suits. In total 39 hand patterns are possible, but only 13 of them have an a priori probability exceeding 1%. The most likely pattern is the 4-4-3-2 pattern consisting of two four-card suits, a three-card suit and a doubleton.

Note that the hand pattern leaves unspecified which particular suits contain the indicated lengths. For a 4-4-3-2 pattern, one needs to specify which suit contains the three-card and which suit contains the doubleton in order to identify the length in each of the four suits. There are four possibilities to first identify the three-card suit and three possibilities to next identify the doubleton. Hence, the number of suit permutations of the 4-4-3-2 pattern is twelve. Or, stated differently, in total there are twelve ways a 4-4-3-2 pattern can be mapped onto the four suits.

Below table lists all 39 possible hand patterns, their probability of occurrence, as well as the number of suit permutations for each pattern. The list is ordered according to likelihood of occurrence of the hand patterns.

Pattern	Probability	#
4-4-3-2	0.21551	12
5-3-3-2	0.15517	12
5-4-3-1	0.12931	24
5-4-2-2	0.10580	12
4-3-3-3	0.10536	4
6-3-2-2	0.05642	12
6-4-2-1	0.04702	24
6-3-3-1	0.03448	12
5-5-2-1	0.03174	12
4-4-4-1	0.02993	4
7-3-2-1	0.01881	24
6-4-3-0	0.01326	24
5-4-4-0	0.01243	12

Pattern	Probability	#
5-5-3-0	0.00895	12
6-5-1-1	0.00705	12
6-5-2-0	0.00651	24
7-2-2-2	0.00513	4
7-4-1-1	0.00392	12
7-4-2-0	0.00362	24
7-3-3-0	0.00265	12
8-2-2-1	0.00192	12
8-3-1-1	0.00118	12
7-5-1-0	0.00109	24
8-3-2-0	0.00109	24
6-6-1-0	0.00072	12
8-4-1-0	0.00045	24

Pattern	Probability	#
9-2-1-1	0.00018	12
9-3-1-0	0.00010	24
9-2-2-0	0.000082	12
7-6-0-0	0.000056	12
8-5-0-0	0.000031	12
10-2-1-0	0.000011	24
9-4-0-0	9.7×10^{−6}	12
10-1-1-1	4.0×10^{−6}	4
10-3-0-0	1.5×10^{−6}	12
11-1-1-0	2.5×10^{−7}	12
11-2-0-0	1.1×10^{−7}	12
12-1-0-0	3.2×10^{−9}	12
13-0-0-0	6.3×10^{−12}	4

The 39 hand patterns can by classified into four hand types: balanced hands, single suiters, two suiters and three-suiters. Below table gives the a priori likelihoods of being dealt a certain hand-type.

Hand type	Patterns	Probability
3 Balanced	4-3-3-3, 4-4-3-2, 5-3-3-2	0.4761
26; Single-suited	6-3-2-2, 6-3-3-1, 6-4-2-1, 6-4-3-0, 7-2-2-2, 7-3-2-1, 7-3-3-0, 7-4-1-1, 7-4-2-0, 7-5-1-0, 8-2-2-1, 8-3-1-1, 8-3-2-0, 8-4-1-0, 8-5-0-0, 9-2-1-1, 9-2-2-0, 9-3-1-0, 9-4-0-0, 10-1-1-1, 10-2-1-0, 10-3-0-0, 11-1-1-0, 11-2-0-0, 12-1-0-0, 13-0-0-0	0.1915
8 Two-suited	5-4-2-2, 5-4-3-1, 5-5-2-1, 5-5-3-0, 6-5-1-1, 6-5-2-0, 6-6-1-0, 7-6-0-0	0.2902
2 Three-suited	4-4-4-1, 5-4-4-0	0.0423

Alternative grouping of the 39 hand patterns can be made either by longest suit or by shortest suit. Below tables gives the a priori chance of being dealt a hand with a longest or a shortest suit of given length.

Longest suit	Patterns	Probability
4 card	4-3-3-3, 4-4-3-2, 4-4-4-1	0.3508
5 card	5-3-3-2, 5-4-2-2, 5-4-3-1, 5-5-2-1, 5-4-4-0, 5-5-3-0	0.4434
6 card	6-3-2-2, 6-3-3-1, 6-4-2-1, 6-4-3-0, 6-5-1-1, 6-5-2-0, 6-6-1-0	0.1655
7 card	7-2-2-2, 7-3-2-1, 7-3-3-0, 7-4-1-1, 7-4-2-0, 7-5-1-0, 7-6-0-0	0.0353
8 card	8-2-2-1, 8-3-1-1, 8-3-2-0, 8-4-1-0, 8-5-0-0	0.0047
9 card	9-2-1-1, 9-2-2-0, 9-3-1-0, 9-4-0-0	0.00037
10 card	10-1-1-1, 10-2-1-0, 10-3-0-0	0.000017
11 card	11-1-1-0, 11-2-0-0	0.0000003
12 card	12-1-0-0	0.000000003
13 card	13-0-0-0	0.000000000006

Shortest suit	Patterns	Probability
Three card	4-3-3-3	0.1054
Doubleton	4-4-3-2, 5-3-3-2, 5-4-2-2, 6-3-2-2, 7-2-2-2	0.5380
Singleton	4-4-4-1, 5-4-3-1, 5-5-2-1, 6-3-3-1, 6-4-2-1, 6-5-1-1, 7-3-2-1, 7-4-1-1, 8-2-2-1, 8-3-1-1, 9-2-1-1, 10-1-1-1	0.3055
Void	5-4-4-0, 5-5-3-0, 6-4-3-0, 6-5-2-0, 6-6-1-0, 7-3-3-0, 7-4-2-0, 7-5-1-0, 7-6-0-0, 8-3-2-0, 8-4-1-0, 8-5-0-0, 9-2-2-0, 9-3-1-0, 9-4-0-0, 10-2-1-0, 10-3-0-0, 11-1-1-0, 11-2-0-0, 12-1-0-0, 13-0-0-0	0.0511

== Number of possible hands and deals ==
There are 635,013,559,600 (${52 \choose 13}$) different hands that one player can hold. Furthermore, when the remaining 39 cards are included with all their combinations there are 53,644,737,765,488,792,839,237,440,000 (53.6 × 10^{27}) different deals possible ($52!/(13!)^4$) The immenseness of this number can be understood by answering the question "How large an area would you need to spread all possible bridge deals if each deal would occupy only one square millimeter?". The answer is: an area more than a hundred million times the surface area of Earth.

Obviously, the deals that are identical except for swapping—say—the ♥2 and the ♥3 would be unlikely to give a different result. To make the irrelevance of small cards explicit (which is not always the case though), in bridge such small cards are generally denoted by an 'x'. Thus, the "number of possible deals" in this sense depends on how many non-honour cards (2, 3, .. 9) are considered 'indistinguishable'. For example, if 'x' notation is applied to all cards smaller than ten, then the suit distributions A987-K106-Q54-J32 and A432-K105-Q76-J98 would be considered identical.

The table below gives the number of deals when various numbers of small cards are considered indistinguishable.

Highest undistinguished card	Number of deals
2	53,644,737,765,488,792,839,237,440,000
3	7,811,544,503,918,790,990,995,915,520
4	445,905,120,201,773,774,566,940,160
5	14,369,217,850,047,151,709,620,800
6	314,174,475,847,313,213,527,680
7	5,197,480,921,767,366,548,160
8	69,848,690,581,204,198,656
9	800,827,437,699,287,808
10	8,110,864,720,503,360
J	74,424,657,938,928
Q	630,343,600,320
K	4,997,094,488
A	37,478,624

Note that the last entry in the table (37,478,624) corresponds to the number of different distributions of the deck (the number of deals when cards are only distinguished by their suit).

== Probability of Losing-Trick Counts ==
The Losing-Trick Count is an alternative to the HCP count as a method of hand evaluation.

LTC	Number of Hands	Probability
0	4,245,032	0.000668%
1	90,206,044	0.0142%
2	872,361,936	0.137%
3	5,080,948,428	0.8%
4	19,749,204,780	3.11%
5	53,704,810,560	8.46%
6	104,416,332,340	16.4%
7	145,971,648,360	23.0%
8	145,394,132,760	22.9%
9	100,454,895,360	15.8%
10	45,618,822,000	7.18%
11	12,204,432,000	1.92%
12	1,451,520,000	0.229%
13	12 is the maximum	N/A
