= Balanced hand =

Hand with an even distribution of suits

A balanced hand or balanced distribution in card games is a hand with an even distribution of suits. In the game of contract bridge, it denotes a hand of thirteen cards which contains no singleton or void and at most one doubleton. Three hand patterns are classified as truly balanced: 4-3-3-3, 4-4-3-2 and 5-3-3-2. The hand patterns 5-4-2-2 (an example of a two suiter) and 6-3-2-2 (a one suiter) are generally referred to as semi-balanced.

In natural bidding systems, balanced hands within specified high card point (HCP) ranges are generally opened with a notrump bid, or rebid in notrump.

In the Netherlands, a bidding system called Boring Club (Dutch: Saaie Klaver) that reserves the 1♣ opening for all balanced hands (boring hands), has gained some popularity.

== See also ==
- Three suiter
- Bridge probabilities
- Kamikaze 1NT
