= Antispades Twos =

Antispades Twos (also known as Antispades Weak Twos) is the name of a bidding convention in the card game bridge. It is a two-level pre-emptive opening based on either a 6-card suit or a two-suiter with at least nine cards distributed across any two suits.

- The 2♣ opening promises 5-10 HCP and either a 6-card club suit, or clubs and diamonds, or clubs and spades.
- The 2♦ opening promises 5-10 HCP and either a 6-card diamond suit, or diamonds and hearts, or diamonds and spades.
- The 2♥ opening promises 5-10 HCP and either a 6-card heart suit, or hearts and spades, or hearts and clubs.
- The 2♠ opening is artificial and very strong, promising either 23+ HCP balanced, or a hand of 16+ HCP and four losers or better.

A drawback is that there is no way to make a standard weak two opening in spades with a 6 card suit. Responder also does not know whether opener is one- or two-suited and whether it is safe to look for a better fit.

== Responses ==
The partner of the Antispades Weak Two opener has the following options available:

- Pass (with eight or more losers and 2+ cards in the suit opened)
- Raise opener's suit with 3+ card support and 7 losers or fewer.
- A pass-or-correct bid which is one step up from the opening — that is 2♣:2♦, 2♦:2♥, or 2♥:2♠.
- With a 15+ HCP hand, responder either bids the forcing 2NT Enquiry or, with 4+ spades after a 2♣ or 2♦ opening, the forcing 2♠ response.

== Defending against Antispades Twos ==
Bidding against an Antispades Two opener is difficult because the defender will probably not know what opener's second suit is, if he has one, and the defender may have more cards in the suit opened than the opener has. However a sensible defence would be:

- Double shows 11+ points. The criteria for tolerance for the unbid suits become less stringent, the more points the doubler has.
- A Suit Overcall shows a good 6+ card suit and seven losers or better.
- The 2NT Overcall shows a two-suited hand — in any of the three unbid suits — with six losers or better.

== Alternatives ==
One- and two- suited hands may be distinguished by methods such as Muiderberg/Lucas Twos combined with Multi 2 diamonds, but the latter bid is restricted on which events it may be used in.

An alternative is to retain the 2♣ bid as strong and use 2♦, 2♥ and 2♠ as one- or two-suited hands. Again, responder does not know which hand type opener holds, and it will be risky to explore for a possible second suit with a misfit in opener's suit.

== See also ==
- Muiderberg convention

== Bibliography ==
- Wilson, Gavin (2016). Antispades Twos — Open Markedly More Often. Claygate, Surrey, UK: Org2B Press. ASIN B01MRUJ8AA.
