= Inverted minors =

Bridge

Inverted minors refers to a treatment introduced by the Kaplan–Sheinwold (K–S) bidding system for the popular card game bridge. The original structure of Precision, another bidding system, also employed inverted minors over a 1♦ opening. However, the treatment is no longer restricted to users of these bidding systems, although partnerships that use a Short club system (where a 1♣ opener might only have 2 clubs) tend also to use the convention only after a 1♦ opener.

== Description ==
The traditional approach in Standard American and Acol, for example, is for a single raise of a minor suit opening to show a weak supporting hand and a double raise as showing a stronger hand of limit raise strength. Using the inverted minor treatment, a single raise of opener's minor suit is strong (usually at least 10 HCP) and a double raise is pre-emptive showing less than 7HCP (which leaves a small gap of 8-9 HCP where judgement is needed on whether to upgrade, downgrade or make a different bid).

The single or double raise promises at least five-card support for the minor. In the original version of K-S, and as further developed by Kaplan through the 1990s, both raises also deny a four-card major.

This typical (but minimum) single raise in clubs is taken from the system book: ♠ 765 ♥ K84 ♦ A5 ♣ Q9652.

This is minimum for a double raise: ♠ 765 ♥ 84 ♦ 85 ♣ J97652. One might use it at favourable vulnerability only. In either case, the partnership is on solid ground after a single raise: opener is either unbalanced or strong, and responder has at least an average hand. The single raise leaves plenty of room to explore for the best contract, and even leaves room for an incautious opponent to enter the bidding and be penalized heavily.

This treatment is well suited to a bidding system that employs the weak no trump. With 1NT used for balanced hands in the 12-14 HCP range, responder to a 1♣ or 1♦ opening knows that partner has either a good hand, 15-17 balanced, or an unbalanced hand with genuine length in minor suit. If opener has a three-card minor, he most often has a strong notrump hand; then, if desirable, it is easy to veer into no trump following the single raise.

Without a 4 card major or 5+ support responder usually bids NT to the appropriate level.

| Opener | Responder | |
| Opener | Call | Meaning |
| 1m | 1NT | 6-10 HCP, balanced hand <5 card support and no 4 card major. After 1♦ it could be a dustbin 1NT with clubs if partnership uses this convention |
| 1m | 2NT | 10-12 HCP balanced hand <5 card support and no 4 card major |
| 1m | 3NT | 13-15 HCP balanced hand <5 card support and no 4 card major |
| 1m | 2m | 15+ HCP balanced hand 4 card support and no 4 card major, you want to investigate slam even without 5 card support |
| 1m | 2/3om | Natural or Criss cross variation |

=== Continuations ===
There are many possible continuations after responder has raised and several are shown below, some partnerships find the risk of forgetting or making an error sufficient to ignore most of these.

==== After a strong raise ====
In this treatment the simple raise is forcing for at least one round. The two sequences that may result in the auction ending below game are 1m —2m—3m and 1m —2m —2NT when this bid shows a weak bid in no-trumps as described in table below.

| Auction | Opener | |
| Auction | Call | Meaning |
| 1m – 2m | 3m | 11-13 HCP minimum opening hand |
| 1m – 2m | 2♦ | When ♣ bid initially; natural, typically 4+ cards, forcing, does not guarantee a stop or 4+ cards in diamonds. This bid implies an imbalanced hand with no stops in the majors since opener did not bid notrumps or a major |
| 1m – 2m | 2M | Stop showing, forcing, does not guarantee 4+ cards in bid suit, denies a stop in other major |
| 1m – 2m | 2NT | Opener was planning to rebid notrumps so this shows the relevant strength (typically 15-17 HCP if playing weak notrumps or 12-14 HCP if playing strong notrumps) with majors stopped. |
| 1m – 2m | 3♣ | When ♦ bid initially; natural, typically 4+ cards, forcing, does not guarantee a stop or 4+ cards in diamonds. This bid implies an imbalanced hand with no stops in the majors since opener did not bid notrumps or a major |
| 1m – 2m | 3M | Natural, 5+ cards in bid suit, not forcing |
| 1m – 2m | 3NT | 18-19 HCP with majors stopped |
| 1m – 2m | 4m | Blackwood according to partnership agreement (Key card, Ace showing or Minorwood for example) with next available suit the first step in the Blackwood sequence |
| 1m – 2m | 4om/M | Splinter in bid suit |

==== After a weak raise ====
After a double raise, the partnership seldom bids on. The idea, of course, is to pre-empt the opponents and cause them to miss their best contract. The exception occurs when opener has a very strong hand and the vulnerability, type of scoring, or partnership agreement means that responder is likely to be in 6-9 HCP range. The following table highlights the bidding options for those situations.

| Auction | Opener | |
| Auction | Call | Meaning |
| 1m – 3m | Pass | 11-15HCP |
| 1m – 3m | 3♦ | When ♣ bid initially, natural, typically 4+ cards, forcing, does not guarantee a stop or 4+ cards in diamonds. This bid implies an imbalanced hand with no stops in the majors since opener did not bid notrumps or a major |
| 1m – 3m | 3M | Stop showing, forcing, does not guarantee 4+ cards in bid suit, denies a stop in other major |
| 1m – 3m | 3NT | 19+ HCP with majors stopped |
| 1m – 3m | m | Blackwood according to partnership agreement (Key card, Ace showing or Minorwood for example) with next available suit the first step in the Blackwood sequence |
| 1m – 3m | 4om/M | Splinter in bid suit |

==== In competition ====
Partnership agreements need to cover whether the system is on after opponents have entered the auction and if the system is off what bids will be used. Many bids will be determined by other conventions used and partnership agreements. Once opponents have entered the auction the chances of game and slam both diminish so different bidding sequences are generally used in this situation.

- 3m now weak and pre-emptive and less than 6 HCP (partnership agreement needed on how weak this can be according to vulnerability)
- 2m is a mixed raise 6-9 HCP with 4+ support and no 4 card major to bid
- Cue bid to show limit raise or better with 4+ support and no 4 card major to bid after opponent's overcall
- Rdbl or Jordan 2NT to show limit raise or better with 4+ support and no 4 card major to bid after opponent's double
- Dbl is still a negative double (in the case of an artificial bid – e.g. transfer overcall this shows the actual unbid suits)
- Other suit bids are natural
- Notrump bids natural – showing stops and balanced hand

== Advantages and disadvantages ==
This convention is considered by many to have few disadvantages

On the positive side:

- The ability to make a forcing bid at the 2 level gives the partnership more room to establish the right level and strain and this is seen as the main benefit
- Once responder has bid 2m showing a weak hand opener might well pass giving the opponents the opportunity to reopen the bidding and find a major suit fit at the 2 level. Bidding 3m has far more pre-emptive value meaning that opponents will need to reopen at the 3 level.

On the negative side

- For players of Strong notrump 3m will be too high in some cases, particularly when opener holds a weak notrump and responder is at the bottom end of the 2m range and quite balanced
- Bidding systems that are highly descriptive also assist the opponents in planning their defence, though this is a disadvantage of any highly descriptive system rather than specific to Inverted minors

== Variations ==
Partnership agreements can vary the convention in many ways including:

- Sometimes the single, strong raise is made with a 4 card suit rather than bidding notrumps to the appropriate level
  - Playing Acol which guarantees 4 cards in the bid minor
  - Playing 5 card majors this would only be done in diamonds as this will tend to be a 4 card suit
- 1m - 3m sequence to show 6-9 HCP
- Criss Cross
  - A jump shift in the other minor 1♣ - 2♦ or 1♦ - 3♣ shows a limit raise (9-12 HCP) and at least 4 card support
  - A simple raise of a minor is therefore game forcing
  - A jump raise in the minor shows 5+ card support and less than 9HCP
- Some players prefer to show aspects of opener's hand other than stops, when bidding a new suit

== Defenses against ==
The bids are mostly quite natural and there don't appear to be specific defenses to Inverted minors in widespread use.
