= Blackout convention =

Blackout is a bridge convention for responding to a reverse bid after a one-over-one beginning, whereby the responder can show whether or not he has better than a minimum response. Responder makes the cheapest bid from either the fourth suit or 2NT to show a hand that has no game interest. All other bids show reasonable hands, generally in the eight point range and are game-forcing. The objective of Blackout is to allow the constructive game-going hands to keep the bidding level low and give more room for the strong auctions that may lead to slams. The convention is also known as Wolff Over Reverses.

Responder then rebids as follows:

- A rebid of his own suit shows five or more cards in the suit and is forcing for one round, but does not promise any extra strength.
- The cheapest bid of the fourth suit is forcing and 2NT shows exactly four cards in his own suit and a minimum hand for his 1-over-1.
- The non-cheapest bid of the fourth suit is forcing and 2NT shows exactly four cards in his own suit, forcing to game but not suitable for any higher bid.
- A preference back to the opening suit or raising the reverse-suit are both natural, game-forcing with mild slam-try or better.

== Examples ==
Auction A
North	South
1♣	1♠
2♦	?

South's Rebid Options
Bid	Meaning
2♥	artificial: exactly 4-cards ♠-suit, and minimum hand for 1♠
2♠	5+ ♠-suit, forcing one-round, but does not promise any extra strength
2NT	artificial: exactly 4-cards ♠-suit and is game-forcing, but hand not suitable for any higher bid
3♣	game-forcing with 3+ ♣-support. At least mild slam-try
3♦	game-forcing with 4+ ♦-support. At least mild slam-try
3♠	game-forcing with 6+ ♠-suit
3NT	natural with stopper in 4th suit

Auction B
North	South
1♦	1♠
2♥	?

South's Rebid Options
Bid	Meaning
2♠	5+ ♠-suit, forcing one-round, but does not promise any extra strength
2NT	artificial: exactly 4-cards ♠-suit, and minimum hand for 1♠
3♣	artificial: exactly 4-cards ♠-suit and is game-forcing, but hand not suitable for any higher bid
3♦	game-forcing with 3+ ♦-support. At least mild slam-try
3♥	game-forcing with 4+ ♥-support. At least mild slam-try
3♠	game-forcing with 6+ ♠-suit
3NT	natural with stopper in 4th suit

== Variation ==
An alternate scheme:

1. After a reverse, the cheaper of fourth suit and 2NT is forcing, showing a relatively weak hand. Opener bids the next bid upwards unless he has game values.
2. If a rebid of responder's suit would be cheaper than fourth suit then it is non-forcing.
3. Other bids are natural and game forcing.
4. Responder's 3NT rebid after bidding the cheaper of fourth suit and 2NT is a mild non-forcing slam try in opener's first suit.

== Deficiencies ==
The scenario wherein Blackout would be invoked occurs rarely and so the foregoing conventional meanings attached to various responder bids are likely to be forgotten.

The following is a critique of Blackout:

There are a number of conventional treatments and Blackout is the best known. In its simplest form, when responder’s second bid is the cheaper of 2NT or the fourth suit it is “Blackout” advising partner that the bidder is minimum, all other continuations are game forcing. There are several variations on this theme, reverse Blackout for example. These are my criticisms.... So much more commonly will the partnership be at the limit of its resources, simple bids like a return to opener’s first suit or a repeat of responder’s are better played as natural and non-forcing. The opener has begun to describe his hand, in fact he has, generally, placed nine or more of his cards in two suits. A strong responder should be able, through 2NT, to allow opener to continue to describe, to find the perfect fit whenever it exists, search out the best game or make a slam investigation. Using 2NT as the prime means of continuing with strong hands is simple, and it frees up other bids, even in the fourth suit, as natural and limited. Mis-fit hands can be diagnosed quickly and the level kept low. To use a new suit bid for no other purpose than to announce a bad hand is self-evidently wasteful. Having at your disposal, means of getting out cheaply and accurately, permits opener to reverse, and thereby not conceal his actual shape, on any hand above the minimum re-bid range.

== See also ==
- Lebensohl, a convention used over a reverse
