= Three suiter =

Hand containing at least four cards in three of the four suits

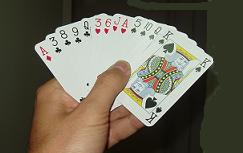

In the game of contract bridge, a three suiter (or three-suited hand) denotes a hand containing at least four cards in three of the four suits. As a bridge hand contains thirteen cards, only two hand patterns can be classified as three suiters: 4-4-4-1 and 5-4-4-0.

In natural bidding systems, strong three suiters are often difficult to describe, as — following the likely response of partner in the short suit — they do not allow for a high-level notrump rebid, nor for a reverse bid. Some systems therefore use dedicated opening bids to describe strong three-suited hands (e.g. the 2♦ opening in the Roman system).

The standard treatment to describe a three-suited hand after an opposing opening in a suit is the takeout double. Conventions like the Kantar cuebid and Cansino can be used to introduce a three-suited hand after an opposing 1NT opening.

== See also ==
- Single suiter
- Two suiter
- Balanced hand
- Bridge probabilities
