= DONT =

Bridge convention

In the card game contract bridge, DONT is a conventional overcall used to interfere with an opponent's one notrump (1NT) opening bid. DONT, an acronym for Disturb Opponents' Notrump, was designed by Marty Bergen, and is therefore also referred to as "Bergen over Notrump". Although the method is often criticized for being too nebulous, it remains fairly popular. The convention was first published in the September/October 1989 issue of Bridge Today.

In DONT, the two-level overcalls of trump show a two suiter (Note: The definition depends on partnership agreement, but usually, a two suiter requires five cards in one suit and four cards in another (5-4), or five cards each in two suits (5-5).) of the suit bid and an unspecified higher-ranking suit. The feature distinguishing DONT from other similar conventions such as Cappelletti is the use of the double to show length in one suit, rather than hand strength or for penalty. DONT is played mainly for interference rather than to establish a contract, so it may occasionally be used for low-strength hands.

== The convention ==
DONT can be used with low hand strength, but intervenor must have good suits when vulnerable. DONT features the following calls:

- Double – shows any single suit (six or more cards); advancer bids 2♣, after which intervenor corrects to his actual suitor or Passes if it is clubs.
- 2♣, 2♦, 2♥ – shows the bid suit and any higher-ranking suit
- 2♠ – shows spades (six or more cards)

Preferences vary as to the use of the 2♠ bid. Some treat it as weaker than the sequence of a double followed by 2♠; others play it as showing a solid (runnable) spade suit; other treatments are possible and partnership discussion and agreement is necessary.

DONT is normally applied as a defense to strong notrump opening bids, but some people have created various modifications to DONT to apply them to weaker notrump openings. The difference is that the bidder shows opening-bid values and the partner of the doubler may pass to convert the single-suited hand into a penalty double.

Against the mini-notrump opening bid which shows 10-12/13 HCP (also known as the Kamikaze 1NT):

- Double is for penalty and shows 13+ points with any shape.
- 2♣ shows any single suit; partner bids 2♦, after which the intervenor corrects to his actual suit.
- 2♦, 2♥, 2♠ shows the bid suit and any higher-ranked suit, with clubs as the highest-ranking suit.

=== Responses ===
There are variations in the agreed responses, and partners should establish a clear agreement.

One common system of responses is:

- Pass – Advancer is willing to play in the suit bid. Advancer will often have shortness in a higher-ranking suit or suits.
- Bid of the next cheapest suit (e.g. 1NT – 2♣ – Pass – 2♦) – Advancer asks overcaller to bid his other long suit, or pass if the bid is in that suit. Advancer will usually have at least 3-card length in all higher-ranking suits. If Advancer asks for overcaller's other suit and then rebids 2NT after overcaller shows it, advancer is making a strong game invitation in the second suit.
  - However over a 2♥ bid (1NT – 2♥ – Pass) a bid of 2♠ is simply a preference for the other known suit, and shows much the same strength as would a raise of the heart suit. Similarly a bid of 3♠ (1NT – 2♥ – Pass – 3♠) would tend to be preemptive.
- Bid of a new suit that is not the cheapest suit (1NT – 2♣ – Pass – 2♥ or 2♠) – Natural, showing advancer's own 6-card or strong 5-card suit.
- A raise of overcaller's 2♣ or 2♦ overcall or rebid tends to be preemptive.
- A raise of overcaller's major-suit overcall or rebid is mildly invitational. 2NT shows the strong invitation.
  - Others treat this as weak also, and insist that all invitational sequences go through 2NT.
- 2NT – A strong game invitation that asks overcaller to bid the other long suit at the 3-level (or 4-level, if the second suit is a major and overcaller is strong enough to accept the invitation). Advancer promises excellent support for all higher-ranking suits.

== Over strong club opening bids ==
When the opponents play Precision Club or other strong club system, 1♣ usually describes a 17-19 point hand. Accordingly, DONT can also be employed over these types of systems.

- Double shows any single suit; advancer bids 2♣, after which intervenor corrects to his actual suit
- 2♣, 2♦, 2♥ shows the bid suit and any higher-ranking suit
- 2♠ – shows spades

=== Variation ===
A variation of the system, claimed to provide additional disturbance of the notrump auction, calls for the partner of the intervenor to bid his cheapest doubleton when the intervenor has shown a single-suited hand. This relies on the Law of total tricks to find adequate protection at the three level.

West	North	East	South
1♣	2♣	Dbl	2♥
Dbl	3♣	?	

In this auction West has a strong hand (17+ points) and East has shown a positive response (8+ points) so they must be in the game zone. West's double of 2♥ is not clear. It might mean that he has a heart suit, but how long of a suit is it? South is known to have at most two cards in that suit. North and South meanwhile have found a minimum 9-card club fit (North with 6 and South with 3+ clubs). In an auction like this, East may just have to bid 3NT and hope for the best. The variation does have a few risks, for example if the partner of the intervenor has two short suits the fit in the agreed suit may be deficient.

== See also ==
- List of defenses to 1NT
