= Landy convention =

Landy, named after its inventor Alvin Landy, is the first of several conventional defenses created to compete against an opponent's one notrump (1NT) opening. Landy is a 2♣ overcall of the opponents' 1NT opening to show at least four cards in each of the major suits; all other bids are natural. Requirements for the overcall vary from partnership to partnership: some require 5-5, some 5-4, and yet others only 4-4 (provided the overall strength is sufficient). The partner can take a preference to either major or make a non-forcing bid of a suit; 2NT is used as a forcing query.

== Extended Landy ==
West	North	East	South
1♦	Pass	1♠	Pass
1NT	2♣		

An extension was proposed by Ira Rubin in 1947 using 2♣ as a takeout request after a response or rebid of 1NT after a suit opening. It implies more distribution and less strength than a double. It also applies in the passout seat.

Based on his initial inability to overcall the 1♦ opening directly, the bid of 2♣ by North shows five or more clubs and exactly four hearts. Similar uses were developed later by others.

== Variations ==
Various additional modifications to Landy have appeared over years, by various authors. The original Landy convention is deemed obsolete amongst tournament players today in favor of more advanced conventions. It is still very popular at club level.

=== Multi-Landy ===
A particular popular modification in the Netherlands is Multi-Landy, a combination of Landy, the Multi 2 diamonds convention and the Muiderberg convention. In this modification, the 2♣ overcall is the same as in Landy, the 2♦ overcall shows a 6-card major suit, and 2♥ or 2♠ overcall shows five cards in that major suit and at least four cards in a minor suit.

Very similar is Reverse or Modified Cappelletti, the only difference being that the 2♦ overcall shows any 6-card suit, either a minor or a major.

=== Woolsey or Robinson ===
A variant developed by Kit Woolsey and Steve Robinson uses the same responses as Multi-Landy (above) but also includes a pinpoint double. A double would show a 4-card major and a 5-card or longer minor, a constructive 6-card or longer single-suited minor, or a hand of 19 high card points or more. After 2♣, advancer would bid 2♦ to show equal length in the majors and ask overcaller to bid their better suit. After 2♦, advancer would respond 2♥ to ask overcaller to pass or correct. Advancer would bid 2♠ showing non-forcing values in spades but invitational values for hearts. Advancer would bid 2NT with a forcing hand asking for further description of overcallers hand. Advancer would bid 3♦ with invitational values in both majors. 3♥ or 4♥ are pass or correct at that level.

== See also ==
- List of defenses to 1NT
