= Highly unusual method =

Class of contract bridge bidding systems defined by the World Bridge Federation

Highly unusual methods (also HUM) is a class of contract bridge bidding systems defined by the World Bridge Federation. Usually these are artificial systems that require advance preparation to contend with, and are restricted to the highest levels of tournament play in most locations. These systems are designated by a yellow sticker, and are more regulated than brown sticker conventions.

The current definition of the WBF lists the following HUM Policy:

A Highly Unusual Method (HUM) means any System that exhibits one or more of the following features by partnership agreement:

1. an opening call of Pass that shows at least the values generally accepted for an opening bid of one, even if there are alternative weak possibilities
2. an opening bid at the one level that may be weaker than Pass.
3. an opening bid at the one level in either 1st or 2nd seat that may be made with 7 high card points or less.
4. an opening bid at the one level that shows either specified length (three cards or more) or specified shortage (one card or less) in a known suit, whilst excluding other intermediate lengths in that same suit.
5. an opening bid at the one level that shows either three cards or more in a specified major or three cards or more in another specified suit.

With the exception to the above being an opening of one of a minor in a strong club or strong diamond system.

== See also ==
- Bridge convention
