= Asptro convention =

Asptro is a contract bridge bidding convention used to intervene over a 1NT opening bid. Its methodology and hence its designation is a combination of two similar conventions – Aspro and Astro.

- 2♣ shows at least 5-4 either way round in hearts, the anchor, and a minor suit. Exceptionally the intervenor holds hearts and spades with preference for spades.
- 2♦ shows at least 5-4 either way round in spades, the anchor, and another suit. If the other suit is hearts, there is preference for hearts.
- 2♥ and 2♠ are natural.

Partner can bid two of the anchor suit, 2M, expecting to play that contract (sign off). 2♦ is a non-forcing enquiry, if available, and 2NT is a forcing enquiry. Other replies are natural. Responder can also pass with 6+ length in the bid minor. (You cannot expect support from partner but it might be the least evil).

After a 2♦ reply, the 2♣ intervenor passes with five diamonds or bids the 5 card suit, always the unknown one with 5-5.

After a 2NT reply, the intervenor routinely bids the unknown suit. Both the anchor and the unknown major imply both majors with preference for the new one. Thus 3♥ and 3♠ may be refined, such as by a strength difference with 3♠ stronger.

== See also ==
- List of defenses to 1NT
