= Kamikaze 1NT =

Kamikaze 1NT is a preemptive 1NT opening in the game of contract bridge and in common practice shows a balanced hand with 10-12 high-card points (HCP) - also known as the mini-notrump range. It is used in first or second seat hoping to make 1NT opposite an average hand of about 10 HCP.

Originally developed by John Kierein as part of a bidding system to indicate 9-12 HCP, he modified the point range to 10-13 HCP because American Contract Bridge League (ACBL) rules on conventions did not allow the use of Stayman on opening notrump bids with a lower limit below 10 HCP.

== See also ==
List of defenses to 1NT
