= Meckwell convention =

Bidding convention in contract bridge

This article describes the contract bridge bidding convention.

Meckwell is a method for defending against an opposing strong one notrump (1NT) opening by intervening in the direct and passout seats. It features the following calls:

Call	Meaning
Double	shows a single minor or both majors; advancer bids 2♣, after which the intervener corrects to his actual suit if a minor, or hearts if holding both majors
2♣ or 2♦	shows the bid suit and a major
2♥ or 2♠	shows the bid suit
2NT	shows the minors

The convention is named based on the common sobriquet for the partnership of Jeff Meckstroth and Eric Rodwell, who popularized it.

== See also ==
- List of defenses to 1NT
