= Last Train (bridge) =

Bridge term

In contract bridge, Last Train refers to a suit bid just below game level in the agreed suit. A Last Train bid is typically made in a bidding sequence in which one of the partners has already indicated slam interest.

A survey in the magazine The Bridge World showed a strong consensus approving the Last Train convention, with the following definition:

“Any time there is only one call that indicates slam interest or further slam interest without raising the partnership’s level of commitment, it is a Last Train slam-try, unrelated to the strain named (unless followed by an uninvited further action).”

The convention was both devised by Jeff Meckstroth and named by him after the Monkees song "Last Train to Clarksville".

Because Last Train is a bidding convention with a special meaning under a partnership agreement, subject to National Regulatory Authority rules, it must be alerted. In the absence of any partnership agreement, most players would interpret the Last Train bid as a control bid, showing a high card value in the suit named.

== Examples ==
1♥ - 3♥
4♣ - 4♦

The 4♣ bid shows a club control and slam interest. If the partnership has agreed to use Last Train, the 4♦ bid indicates extra values (i.e., responder's hand is at the upper end of the strength range indicated by the 3♥ bid) and invites partner to continue exploring slam. 4♦ does not show a diamond control, although of course responder might have one.

1♠ - 4♦
4♥

The 4♥ bid asks responder to consider bidding slam with values beyond those already shown (4♦ is a splinter bid showing at least four spades and a singleton diamond).
