= Brown sticker =

Conventional agreement in contract bridge

Brown sticker is a category of contract bridge conventional agreements defined by the World Bridge Federation (WBF). Brown sticker conventions are considered to be difficult to defend against, and thus are permitted only at high levels of tournament play. Only highly unusual methods (HUMs) have a higher classification.

A convention qualifies for a brown sticker if it fulfills any of the following criteria:

1. An opening bid of 2♣ through 3♠ may be weak and does not promise a known suit.
2. An overcall of a natural opening at the one level does not promise four cards in a known suit.
3. A weak two-suited bid where one of the suits by definition may be only three cards or shorter.
4. It is used for protection of psychic bids, or systemically required psyches.

Notable exceptions are the Multi 2 diamonds (due to its popularity), a natural 1NT overcall, and cue bids on strong hands to force partner.

In general, if a bid is weak (or potentially weak having multiple options) and does not promise four cards in a defined suit (when weak), then it is likely to qualify as a brown sticker convention.
