= Serious 3NT =

Contract bridge convention

Serious 3NT is a contract bridge bidding convention. It is used in game-forcing auctions where a major suit has been agreed upon.

1♠–2♣ if using 2/1 Game Forcing or 2♠–3♠ (Agreeing spades)

The next bid indicates suitability for slam:

- 3NT: strong (Serious 3NT)
- 4♣/4♦/4♥: cuebid, but not strong (non-serious).
- 4♠: truly minimum.

Since Spades are the agreed trump suit, Three No Trump is not usually the best contract. Using Serious Three No Trump, a bid of Three No Trump says "I am Serious about slam", i.e. "I have a good hand". Bypassing bidding Three No Trump says "I am not Serious about Slam". Examples shown in the above auction.

If one player bypasses 3NT with a Cuebid (and is 'not serious'), then a Cuebid by partner indicates that he is serious. Note that in the example auction above, if the strong hand is next (after the 3♠ bid), he can differentiate between a strong hand, a weak hand that has a control (in case partner is strong) or a minimum hand.

Serious Three No Trump was devised by and named by Eric Rodwell.

== Frivolous 3NT ==
Some partnerships reverse the meaning of 3NT in this situation. A weak hand bids 3NT to indicate no additional strength. This has the effect that a weak hand will not pinpoint a control for the defense.
