= Cappelletti convention =

Contract bridge bidding convention

Cappelletti (also called Hamilton and Pottage) is a defensive bridge convention used in the card game contract bridge to compete or interfere in the auction when an opponent has opened one notrump (1NT). It is usually attributed to Michael Cappelletti and his longtime partner Edwin Lewis, but the origin of the concept has also been claimed by Fred Hamilton, John Pottage and Gerald Helms. Cappelletti can show a variety of one- and two-suited hands while retaining the penalty double for stronger hands.

== Application ==
Cappelletti is particularly recommended for use against a weak 1NT opening (12-14 HCP) but can also be used against a strong 1NT opening (15-17 HCP). Cappelletti can be employed in either the direct seat or balancing seat.

=== Double ===
When holding 15 or more high card points (HCP), a double is for penalties.

=== Overcalls ===
With 9-14 HCP, other overcalls are artificial bids promising either a one-suited or two-suited holding. Importance is given to the state of vulnerability and the location of the values, which should be concentrated in the suit or suits held.

Over the 1NT opening, the over-calling opponent, known as the intervener, makes one of the following artificial bids to indicate a one-suited or a two-suited hand:

- 2♣ declares a one-suited hand - usually 6 or more cards, but some bid with a strong 5-card suit. The partner, known as the advancer, is expected to respond as follows:
  - usually, the advancer makes an artificial relay bid of 2♦, asking the intervener to pass if his suit is diamonds and otherwise to bid his long suit at the lowest level.
  - exceptionally, if the advancer has a good 6-card major suit, he bids two of that major instead of the conventional relay bid.
- 2♦ declares both major suits (traditionally at least 5-5 in length but now often reduced to 5-4). The advancer corrects to his longest major, bidding at the lowest level.
- 2 of a major suit declares 5 in the bid major and 4 in an as yet undisclosed minor suit. If he has a tolerance for the major suit, the advancer passes. Otherwise, he bids 2NT, inviting the intervener to bid his minor. Before making the switch to the minor, it is usually possible to deduce what that minor suit will likely be, since length in a suit in partner's hand is likely to reflect a suit shortage in your own hand.
- 2NT declares both minor suits (at least 5-4 or 4-5). the advancer corrects to his longest minor, bidding at the lowest level.

All artificial bids must be alerted.

=== Reverse Cappelletti or Multi-Landy ===
This variant reverses the 2♣ and 2♦ bids above, so that for hands with both majors it is similar to the Multi-Landy convention.

=== Extending the bidding towards game ===
With a strong hand of his own(13+ HCP), the advancer may think that the defensive partnership could have the possibility of a game call themselves.

To explore this possibility, any bid by the advancer beyond the natural conclusion of the intervener’s calls described above, is invitational to game.
Such a bid shows most importantly the HCP range in the advancer’s holding (which should be 13+ HCP — the intervener has promised only 9 HCPs, and since bidding is now advancing to the 3-level, 13 HCP in advancer's hand guarantees a minimum joint holding of 22 HCP for the partnership).

The advancer should consider that if he makes a 3-level bid in a suit ranking above the Cappelletti suit, then there may be no exit to bidding short of a Game Call anyway, so he should consider if he will be forcing a de facto game call by advancing the bidding in this way, and the probabilities of the partnership holding supporting it.

The most common and most useful circumstance for this is when the defender's own game call is likely to be 3NT, as in the following:

1. In this scenario, a Cappelletti bidding sequence between the intervener and the advancer of overcall 2♣-2♦-2♠ shows the advancer that partner has 9-14 HCP in a spades suit.

So if the advancer’s holding is 14+ HCP and with stops in the other suits, (bearing in mind that partner might have shortage in at least one of them so those stops need to be dependable), the advancer might extend the bidding to 2NT to ask the intervener if they are minimum or maximum.

With only 9-10 HCP, the intervener either passes, or if his own suit is likely to perform better, signs-off by re-bidding his own suit.

But with 11+ HCP, thus promising a partnership holding of at least 25 HCPs, the intervener advances to a game call of 3NT.

Finally, if the advancer has shortage in the Capelletti suit then 3NT is passed, but with 3+ card support for partner's Cappelletti major suit, then he signs off by correcting to a game call in the major suit.

(With the opposition having opened 1NT, to go beyond 3NT is unsafe if the Cappelletti suit is a minor).

1. In this scenario, a Cappelletti bid from the intervener of, for example, overcall 2♥ shows the advancer that partner has 9-14 HCP in a hearts suit and also another undisclosed 4 card minor suit.

So if the advancer is holding 14+ HCP and three cards in hearts, the advancer should extend the bidding to 3♥, asking the intervener 'Are you top or bottom of your points range?'.

With only 9-10 HCP, the intervener decides whether to pass 3♥ or sign-off with a game call of 4♥.

Of course with 11+ HCP the intervener doesn't need to think before signing-off with a game call of 4♥.

1. In this scenario, a Cappelletti bid from the intervener of, for example, overcall 2♥ shows the advancer that partner has 9-14 HCP in a hearts suit and also another undisclosed 4 card minor suit.

So with the advancer’s holding of 14+ HCP but only a doubleton in hearts, the advancer bids 2NT inviting the intervener to bid his minor. So the bidding sequence has now been 2♥-2NT-3♦.

The advancer now has to assess what the joint holding is; his partner likely has stopping values in hearts, and his length assures the heart suit is safe. Provided that the advancer has stopping values in the other three suits in his own holding (bearing in mind that partner may not have stopping values in diamonds, merely 4-card length), the only question for the advancer is whether or not the HCP holding for the partnership is strong enough for 3NT.

If the advancer has less than 15 HCP, this is a judgement decision, factoring in the range of the intervener, any outstanding cards and their locations, and possible finesses, among other factors.

== See also ==
- Bidding system
- Glossary of contract bridge terms
- List of defenses to 1NT
