= Two suiter =

Hand containing cards mostly from two of the four suits

In contract bridge, a two suiter is a hand containing cards mostly from two of the four suits. Traditionally a hand is considered a two suiter if it contains at least ten cards in two suits, with the two suits not differing in length by more than one card. Depending on suit quality and partnership agreement different classification schemes are viable. The more modern trend is to lower the threshold of ten cards to nine cards and consider 5-4 distributions also two suiters.

The six possible combinations are given the names "major suits" (spades and hearts), "minor suits" (diamonds and clubs), "black suits" (spades and clubs), "red suits" (hearts and diamonds), "pointed suits" (spades and diamonds), and "rounded suits" (hearts and clubs).

When including two suited hands with 5-4 distribution, two suiters have a high likelihood of occurrence, and the modern preemptive style is to incorporate such two-suited hands in the arsenal of preemptive openings. Example of such a preemptive conventional opening is the Muiderberg convention. Some take this aggressive style even further and use Ekren to preemptively open on a 4-4 in the majors.

Conventional overcalls such as Michaels, Unusual notrump, Ghestem and Raptor are designed to introduce a two suiter over an opening bid of the opponents. Conventions like Landy, DONT, Lionel and CoCa can be used to denote a two suiter over an opposing 1NT bid.

== See also ==
- Single suiter
- Three suiter
- Balanced hand
- Michaels
- Unusual notrump
- Ghestem
- Raptor
- Muiderberg
- Ekren
