= Precision Club =

Bidding system in the game of contract bridge

Precision Club is a bidding system in the game of contract bridge. It is a strong club system developed in 1969 for C. C. Wei by Alan Truscott, and used by Taiwan teams in 1969. Their success in placing second at the 1969 Bermuda Bowl (and Wei's multimillion-dollar publicity campaign) launched the system's popularity.

The central feature of the Precision system is that an opening bid of one club is used for any hand with 16 or more high card points (HCP), regardless of distribution. An opening bid of one of a major suit signifies a five-card suit and 11–15 HCP. A one notrump opening bid signifies a balanced hand (no five-card major suit) and 13–15 HCP.

== Popularity ==
After the success of Taiwan teams in 1969 and 1970 Bermuda Bowls with the system, the entire Italian Blue team switched to Precision Club and won yet another World Team Olympiad in 1972. The modifications to the system were made chiefly by Benito Garozzo and he titled it Super Precision. Today, multiple world champions Jeff Meckstroth and Eric Rodwell play their own variant known as RM Precision. In North America, Precision is less commonly played than Standard American or 2/1 game forcing, especially at the club level.

== Advantages and disadvantages ==
Advocates of Precision say that it is generally more efficient (and precise, as the name would suggest) than systems such as Standard American. Because all opening bids except 1♣ are limited, the responder almost immediately knows the hand potential and the chances for a part score, game or slam.

Critics of Precision question the wisdom of combining a strong club with 5-card majors. This causes certain hand shapes to bid awkwardly, and a high percentage of hands are opened with one diamond, including in some cases hands with only a doubleton diamond.

This is so absurd that I wish to go on record in stating that the Big Club cannot be played with any hope of success if you attempt to use it by bidding only 5-card majors.

— Howard Schenken, Howard Schenken's Big Club, Simon and Schuster, 1968

My opinion on Precision is that combining five-card majors with a forcing club is like trying to mix oil and water, and it has serious structural defects…"

— Bob Hamman, Smith, Mark. World Class: Conversations with the Bridge Masters, Master Point Press, 1999

The main disadvantage of the strong-club system is its vulnerability to preemptive bids. Knowing that they rarely can make game against a strong-club opening, experienced opponents will compete in the bidding with distributional hands, regardless of strength, and rob bidding space from the opening side.

== Main opening sequences ==
- 1♣: Conventional, 16+
  - Responses:
  - 1♦: negative, 0–7. If playing the "impossible negative", any 4–4–4–1; this will be followed by a strong rebid.
  - 1♥, 1♠, 2♣, 2♦: 8+, 5-card suit
  - 1NT: 8–10, balanced
  - 2♥, 2♠: 4–7, 6-card suit
  - 2NT: 11–13 or 16+, balanced
  - 3♣, 3♦, 3♥, 3♠: 4–7, 7-card suit
  - 3NT: 14–15, balanced
- 1♦: 11–15, no 5 card major or 6 card club suit. Originally 4+ suit and unbalanced hand. A notrump range is included in some versions, 2+ suit in this case. In some versions, where classic precision 2♦ opening is not played diamonds can be even shorter.
- 1♥, 1♠: 11–15, 5-card suit
- 1NT: (12)13–15, balanced
- 2♣: 11–15, 6-card suit or a 5-card suit with a 4-card major (always 6+ suit in some versions of the system)
- 2♦: Conventional, 11–15, 4=3=1=5, 3=4=1=5, 4=4=1=4 or 4=4=0=5 distribution (singleton or void in diamond, no 5-card majors, no 6-card club suit).
- 2♥, 2♠: Weak two bid, 6–10, good 6-card suit
- 2NT: 22–24, balanced
- 3♣, 3♦, 3♥, 3♠: normal preempts
- 3NT: Conventional (Gambling), solid 7-card minor suit leading with AKQ, no outside strength

== Precision today ==
Precision has seen several variations since 1969. 3NT is played as gambling (where it used to show 24–27 HCP), 1♣ – 1♦ is no longer a 4–4–4–1 (impossible negative), and the unusual positive is used instead.

When 1♣ – 1♦ is no longer a 4–4–4–1,

- 1♣ – 2♥ = 8+ HCP, 4–4–4–1 singleton ♠;
- 1♣ – 2♠ = 8+ HCP, 4–4–4–1 singleton ♣;
- 1♣ – 3♣ = 8+ HCP, 4–4–4–1 singleton ♦;
- 1♣ – 3♦ = 8+ HCP, 4–4–4–1 singleton ♥

Also, modern Precision often uses relay bids or transfer responses to 1♣ to both try to make the strong hand declarer and saving space in the auction. Other popular Precision variations on opening bids are using a strong 1NT (14–16 is most common), using 2♣ to show only a 6+ club suit and expanding the possible hand patterns for the 2♦ bid to include the usual 4–4–1–4 and 4–4–0–5 as well as 4–3–1–5 and 3–4–1–5,1♦ bid promises at least 2 diamonds.

=== RM (Meckwell) Precision ===
RM Precision is a bidding system played by Eric Rodwell and Jeff Meckstroth (which we will call Meckwell) – one of the most successful bridge partnerships of all time. Meckwell bidding is highly sophisticated variation of Precision system. Most of RM Precision was developed subsequently in the early '80s with adaptations following more slowly thereafter. Meckwell notes are a guarded secret. Though many conventions has been openly described and used: support double, conventional transfers in many situations, the pass-double inversion, Meckwell Defense... They trade long and verbose Alpha, Beta and Gamma Asking Bids for the shorter and concise descriptive sequences. The convention card is available on the internet. Eric Kokish nicely outlines the Meckwell system:

Their trademark is their tendency to open and overcall very light and consistently play routine partscore deals in game, making a far higher percentage of these games than the odds would suggest. Some intermediate jump overcalls (unfavorable vulnerability) and a no-fear two-suited overcall style.

==== Meckwell Lite ====
Meckwell Lite is a simplified version of RM Precision popular among students and widely played in many bridge clubs. There are many versions of Meckwell Lite (some are listed in external links). The common goal is to keep the active features of RM Precision and simplify the auction variations.
