= Relay bid =

In contract bridge, a relay bid is a conventional bid that usually has little or no descriptive meaning but asks partner to describe some feature of his hand. A relay is often the cheapest bid available but need not be. Stayman and Blackwood are common examples of relay bids.

The rationale for introducing relay bids emerged from the idea that it is not always the best use of bidding space for both partners to describe their hands. Instead, only one partner can make the cheapest bids available (relays) while the other describes his hand. This is especially useful when the asker has a balanced or very strong hand.

Relay bidding systems are for the most part based on relay bids: in most sequences (especially forcing ones), one partner just relays while the other describes his hand in a highly codified manner. While relay systems offer a higher level of exchanged information than natural systems, they also have the drawbacks that they are complicated to memorize and often exclude the players' judgment, particular in regard to honor location, which can be crucial.

There is often confusion between puppet bids and relays. A puppet bid requests partner to make the cheapest bid regardless of his hand. A relay bid requests partner to make a descriptive bid in response. The descriptive response can be natural (as in Stayman) or coded (as in Blackwood). A "marionette" bid is similar to a puppet bid except that it allows responses other than the cheapest bid with certain uncommon hand types. Thus technically it's a relay but with the cheapest bid expected most of the time.

== See also ==
- Relay (disambiguation)
