= Brozel =

Contract bridge convention

Brozel is a contract bridge bidding convention used to intervene after an opposing one notrump (1NT) opening bid. It features the following calls:

- Double – shows any single suit; advancer bids 2♣, after which intervenor corrects to his actual suit (or passes with clubs). This was originally played as requiring either a solid suit or a very good suit and an entry, leaving advancer the opportunity to pass with a couple of side-suit stoppers, though many partnerships now allow a weaker suit.
- 2♣ – shows clubs and hearts
- 2♦ – shows diamonds and hearts
- 2♥ – shows hearts and spades
- 2♠ – shows spades and an unspecified minor suit
- 2NT – shows clubs and diamonds

Brozel is named loosely after its creator, Bernard Zeller.

== See also ==
- List of defenses to 1NT
