= List of defenses to 1NT =

This is a list of defensive conventions used in the game of contract bridge to compete in the bidding after the opponents have opened with a one notrump (1NT) bid.

- ANTI
- Aspro
- Asptro, a hybrid of Astro and Aspro
- Astro, Modified Astro, Pinpoint Astro,
  Grano-Astro, Roth-Stone Astro
- Astrolite
- Becker
- Bergen over 1NT (see DONT)
- Blue Club transfers (see Transfer overcalls)
- Brozel
- Cansino, Modified Cansino
- Canape transfers
- Cappelletti, Modified Cappelletti, Revised Cappelletti
- CDH Buchanan
- CHASM
- Comfy Canapé or CoCa
- CRASH (a.k.a. CRO)
- Crowhurst convention
- DONT, Revised DONT
- Exclusion bids (a.k.a. Super Convention)
- Feathertson
- Feel Away Notrump (FAN)
- Feel Oriented Notrump Destroyer (FOND)
- Gates adjunct
- Grano-Astro (see Astro)
- Hamilton
- Hello
- Kelsey
- Landy
- Lionel
- Maestro Double
- Meckwell
- Meyerson
- Modified Astro (see Astro)
- Mohan
- MONK
- Multi-Landy
- Nilsland
- Pinpoint Astro (see Astro)
- Pottage, Revised Pottage
- Power
- RCO
- Ripstra
- Roche convention
- Roth
- Roth-Stone Astro (see Astro)
- Sahara convention
- Scorrchio
- Sharples convention, Modified Sharples
- Soap convention
- Splash convention
- Suction, Twerb Suction, Suction Redwood
- Supernatural
- Tizi convention
- Toss convention
- Transfer overcalls
- TRASH
- Uni-club
- Vroom convention
- Modified Wallis
- Westwood convention See also WIND convention
  and WINDA
- WIND convention
- WINDA
- WONT
- Woolsey
