= Pass-or-correct bid =

Type of bid in contract bridge

In the card game bridge a pass-or-correct bid (or convertible bid), is a non-forcing bid that asks the partner to pass or bid differently based on her/his holding. Pass-or-correct bids are generally used as responses to multiway bids.

A typical example is the 2♠ response on a multi 2 diamonds opening that asks the partner to pass with a weak hand with long spades or to bid three hearts with a weak hand and long hearts. This 2♠ bid implies length in hearts and denies length in spades.

Pass-or-correct bids that are made in a suit without length in that suit when the length in one of two suits has been shown by the partner's bid are also referred to as paradox responses.

== Conventions using pass-or-correct bids ==
- Multi 2 diamonds
- CRASH
- Suction convention
- Mini-Roman 2 Diamond
- Antispades Twos

== See also ==
- ParadoX Advances in Bridge
