= Kit Woolsey =

American backgammon and bridge player

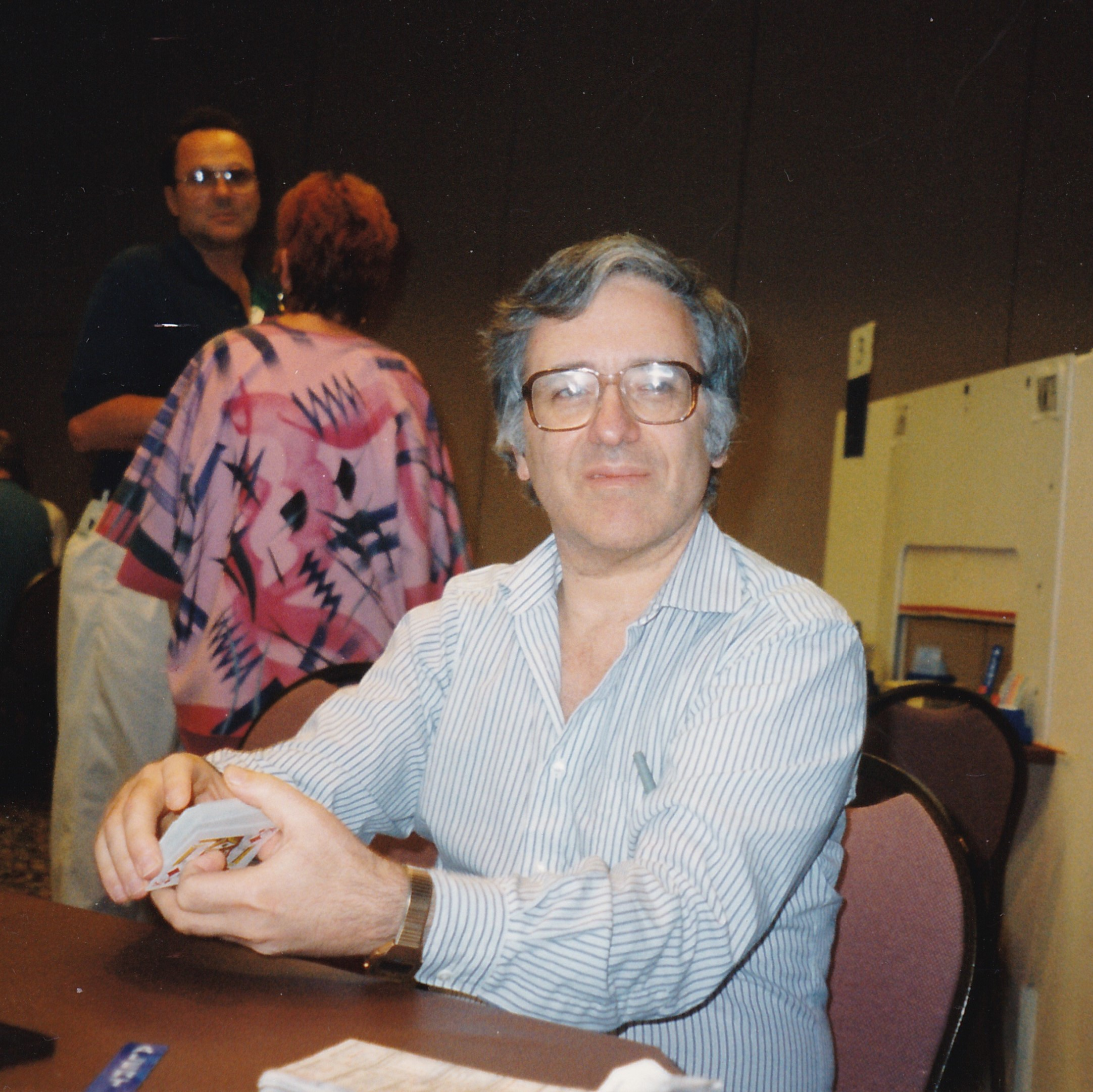
Kit Woolsey

Kit Woolsey (born Christopher Robin Woolsey in 1943) is an American bridge and backgammon player. He was inducted into the ACBL Hall of Fame in 2005.

== Personal life ==
Woolsey was born in Washington, DC. He graduated from Oberlin College in 1964 and earned a master's degree in mathematics from the University of Illinois at Urbana–Champaign in 1965. He lives in Kensington, California with his wife, world champion finalist bridge player Sally Woolsey.

== Career ==
In bridge, he was the winner of the 1986 Rosenblum Cup world teams championship. He was also runner-up in the 1982 Rosenblum Cup, 1989 Bermuda Bowl and won the Senior Teams at the 2000 World Team Olympiad, and another gold at the 2003 Senior Bowl, as well as more than a dozen American Contract Bridge League (ACBL) North American Bridge Championships (NABC-level) events. Many of his successes were in partnership with Ed Manfield. He is a World Bridge Federation (WBF) World Grand Master and was Inducted into the ACBL Hall of Fame in 2005. In backgammon he was runner-up in the 1996 World Cup; as of 2007 he was the 5th-rank player in the world.

Woolsey has written many bridge and backgammon books, and contributed to the bridge bidding theory with innovations including the two-way checkback convention and Woolsey, a defense against opposing notrump openings. He won the 1978 International Bridge Press Association (IBPA) award for Best Article or Series on a System or Convention. Since 1984, Woolsey has been one of four (before 2005) or six rotating directors of The Bridge World's monthly Master Solvers Club.

Kit Woolsey is editor of the online backgammon magazine GammOnLine. As of May 2014, the annotated match in the free "Demo issue" is "from 1996 World Cup finals between Malcolm Davis and Kit Woolsey".

Kit's wife Sally Woolsey was player-captain of the runner-up team, or losing finalist, for the inaugural, 1994 McConnell Cup—a quadrennial world championship event for women that runs to parallel to the open Rosenblum Cup he won in 1986. From 1998 they have played together in all four Mixed Pairs championships at the same convention, now called the World Bridge Series Championships (within the bridge world, World Series for short).

== Bridge accomplishments ==
=== Honors ===
- ACBL Hall of Fame, 2005
- American Backgammon Hall of Fame, 2015

=== Awards ===
- Herman Trophy 1986
- Precision Award (Best Article or Series on a System or Convention) 1978

=== Wins ===
- Rosenblum Cup (1) 1986
- Senior Bowl (1) 2003
- Senior International Cup (1) 2000
- North American Bridge Championships (19)
  - Vanderbilt (1) 1991
  - Grand National Teams (3) 1984, 2009, 2017
  - Open Board-a-Match Teams (1) 1994
  - Men's Board-a-Match Teams (3) 1978, 1986, 1989
  - North American Men's Swiss Teams (2) 1986, 2012
  - Blue Ribbon Pairs (3) 1973, 1975, 1990
  - Open Pairs (2) 1987, 1989
  - Men's Pairs (2) 1972, 1985
  - Mixed Pairs (1) 1967
  - Baze Senior Knockout Teams (1) 2012
- United States Bridge Championships (6)
  - Open Team Trials (2) 1989, 2009
  - Senior Team Trials (5) 2000, 2001, 2003, 2019, 2021
- Other notable wins:
  - Cavendish Invitational Teams (1) 1990
  - Reisinger Knockout Teams (1) 1981
  - Cavendish Invitational Pairs (3) 1979, 1994, 2011

=== Runners-up ===
- Bermuda Bowl (1) 1989
- Rosenblum Cup (1) 1982
- North American Bridge Championships (22)
  - Vanderbilt (2) 1992, 1999
  - Spingold (3) 1979, 1981, 1992
  - Reisinger (1) 1980
  - Grand National Teams (4) 1977, 2006, 2014, 2016
  - Mixed Board-a-Match Teams (1) 1997
  - Blue Ribbon Pairs (3) 1985, 1986, 2002
  - Life Master Men's Pairs (2) 1971, 1972
  - Open Pairs (1) 1981
  - Open Pairs I (1) 1996
  - Open Pairs II (1) 2004
  - Men's Pairs (2) 1973, 1974
  - Base Senior Knockout Teams (1) 2010
  - Freeman Mixed Board-a-Match (1) 2010
- United States Bridge Championships (1)
  - Open Team Trials (1) 2005
- Other notable 2nd places:
  - Cavendish Invitational Teams (1) 1999
  - EOE Optiebeurs Pairs (1) 1990
  - Cavendish Invitational Pairs (1) 1980
  - Goldman Pairs (2) 1980, 1982

== Publications ==
=== Bridge ===
- Woolsey, Kit (1982). Matchpoints. Shelbyville, KY: Devyn Press Inc. p. 343. ISBN 978-0-910791-00-7. OCLC 13491401. — (reprinted 1988 and 1992) Louisville, KY: Devyn Press Inc., pp. 343, OCLC 477153995.
- Woolsey, Kit (1980). Partnership Defense in Bridge. Shelbyville, KY: Devyn Press Inc. p. 303. OCLC 7498214. — (reprinted 1991), pp. 303, ISBN 978-0-910791-68-7.
- Woolsey, Kit (1981). Modern Defensive Signalling in Contract Bridge. Port Chester, NY: Barclay Bridge Supplies Inc. p. 64. — (reprinted 1992) Louisville, KY: Devyn Press Inc., pp. 64, ISBN 0-910791-40-6.
- Baron, Randy; Champney, Ken; Woolsey, Kit (1979). Clobber Their Artificial Club. Shelbyville, NY: Baron Bridge Supplies Inc. p. 20. OCLC 69199994. — (reprinted 1980). — (2nd edition 1983), Louisville: Devyn Press Inc., pp. 32. OCLC 10409994. — (reprinted 1990), pp 32.
- The Language of Bridge. Bridge winners. 2017

=== Backgammon ===
- New Ideas in Backgammon (with Hal Heinrich)
- How to Play Tournament Backgammon
- Backgammon: Master Versus Amateur, Volume 1
- MatchQiz Book: Greiner vs Phillip Marmorstein
- MatchQiz Book: Hal Heinrich vs. Mika Lidov
- MatchQiz Book: Joe Sylvester vs. Nack Ballard
- Understanding Backgammon (with Tami Jones)
- 52 Great Backgammon Tips (with Patti Beadles)
- The Backgammon Encyclopedia, Volume 1: Cube Reference Positions
- The Backgammon Encyclopedia, Volume 2: More Cube Reference Positions
