= Aspro convention =

Aspro is a contract bridge bidding convention devised by Terence Reese as a British variant on the Astro convention to intervene over a 1NT opening bid.

Like Astro, Aspro is initiated by a 2-level overcall in a minor suit when the overcaller or intervenor holds an unbalanced hand with at least nine cards in two suits (i.e. 5 in one and 4 in the other), at least one of which is a major.

- 2♣ shows hearts and another suit, and
- 2♦ shows spades and a minor suit.

== Subsequent bidding ==
The foregoing includes the possibility that the 2♣ overcaller holds both majors. Using Aspro with five spades and four or five hearts, the 2♣ bid is followed by 2♠ over partner's 2♦ or 2♥; with four spades and five hearts, one rebids 2♥ over partner's 2♦.

== See also ==
- List of defenses to 1NT
