= Muiderberg convention =

Muiderberg is a bidding convention in the card game bridge. It is a two-level preemptive opening based on a two-suiter with precisely a five-card major and a minor suit (four-card or longer). In Muiderberg the 2♥ opening denotes five hearts and an unknown minor suit, whilst 2♠ denotes five spades and an unknown minor suit. The convention is also known as the Dutch Two, Lucas Two or Woo Two (mainly UK) opening. The convention is named after the Dutch village Muiderberg, the residence of the designers of the convention – Onno Janssens and Willem Boegem.

== Responses ==
The partner of the Muiderberg opener can take the following actions:

- pass (with tolerance for the opened suit)
- bid 3♣ (a pass-or-correct bid)
- bid 3♦ to invite for game in the major suit
- bid 2♠ (over 2♥) as a contract improvement (opener is allowed to raise with a suitable hand)
- bid 3♥/♠ (opener's suit) as a preemptive raise
- bid 3♠/♥ (other major) which is non-forcing but invitational
- ask for the minor suit using a 2NT relay bid with a strong hand.

The 2NT response is often defined as forcing to game, for example in Biedermeijer and AcolPlus. In particular, with a strong hand with a good suit of its own or with support for partner's opened suit, responder must bid 2NT first, as there is no other way to establish a force. The Muiderberg opener can respond in several ways to the 2NT answer:

- bid 3♣ with a minimum and clubs / with four clubs
- bid 3♦ with a minimum and diamonds / with four diamonds
- bid 3♥ with a maximum and clubs / with five or more clubs
- bid 3♠ with a maximum and diamonds / with five or more diamonds
- bid 3NT with 4-4 in both minors
- bid 4♣/♦ with a 6+ cards in the bid suit

Both approaches (2NT forcing to game or forcing for one round only) are equally popular.

In competition, 3♣ is natural (opener is expected to pass) while 2NT asks for opener's minor suit and is not necessarily strong. Further, 4♣/♦ are defined as fit-bids in competition.

== Variants ==
Partnerships may choose to play Muiderberg Twos (or the variants below) as: (a) at least 5-4 shape, (b) at least 5-5 shape, or (c) at least 5-4 when non-vulnerable but at least 5-5 when vulnerable, for added safety. Statistically, 5-4 hands are about four times as common as 5-5.

A variant known as Lucas Twos allow for five cards or more in the bid suit (diamonds, hearts or spades) and four cards or more in a second suit which can be any of the remaining three suits. Particularly in the UK, the term Lucas Two is often used to describe what is actually a Muiderberg Two, where the second suit has to be a minor; this makes it safer for responder to explore for a second-suit fit if short in opener's longest suit.

A difficulty with Muiderberg and Lucas Twos is that it is no longer possible to make a Weak Two bid with a single-suited major. These hands may instead be bid using the Multi 2 diamonds convention.

Another variant, called Antispades Twos, provides for either a two-suited hand containing at least nine cards in the two suits with four or more cards in the bid suit — clubs, diamonds or hearts — and four or more in another suit, or a single-suited hand of at least six cards in the bid suit, in a hand worth 5–10 HCP.

== See also ==
- Antispades Twos

== Bibliography ==
- Wilson, Gavin (2016). Antispades Twos — Open Markedly More Often. Claygate, Surrey, UK: Org2B Press. ASIN B01MRUJ8AA.
