= Multi two diamonds =

Contract bridge convention

Multi-coloured 2 diamonds, is a contract bridge convention whereby the opening bid of 2♦ shows a defined range of hand types. These always include a weak-two bid in a major suit, and the second option, that must be a strong. The inherent ambiguity as to both suit and strength makes a powerful, and hence popular. It was originally considered disruptive, but is now thought fairly easy to defend. It is commonplace in the British Isles, permitted in international competition, but rarely seen in North America.

The convention offers several constructive system opportunities. It might be decided that its weak option always be a standard 6-card Major, and then that 2♥ and 2♠ are used as e.g. the Muiderberg/Lucas Two two-suited weak openings.

The strong options are also important as they may be used for hand types that are otherwise awkward within your general system. Some English pairs include 2NT with 5-card major or 6-card minor. This avoids need for puppet Stayman, greatly streamlining assessment of slam prospects over a simplified 2NT opening.

While technically a "brown sticker" convention because Multi has no known "anchor suit", its popularity, and availability of published defenses, have persuaded the World Bridge Federation to allow its use even in lower rankings tournaments. It is described in the WBF Convention Booklet. It is permitted by the English Bridge Union at competition level. 2♦ is not "Multi" if it is not ambiguous with respect to its weak major option

== Description ==
An opening bid of 2♦ which contains both a weak and a strong option.

The weak option is either 5+ ambiguous major or hearts.

The strong option is 1 or 2 choices taken from:

- An Acol Two(the suit need not be specified)
- A strong 3-suited hand(the singleton need not be specified)
- A strong balanced or semi balanced hand(with or without a singleton)
- A game forcing hand type

== Continuation ==
A multi 2 diamonds is forcing for one round.

The initial response should assume that opener has a weak two in a major. It is standard to offer a paradox method advance, in which 2♥ is a pass or correct bid, while 2♠ indicates a willingness to play in hearts.

A common agreement is that calls of 3♥ and above extend the preempt . Paradox methods are again applied; 3♠ shows a willigness to play in 4♥. 4♥ is either to play or a pass or correct bid.

== After interference ==
A simple agreement over double is to simply make the same paradox advance that you would have done anyway. Either pass or redouble(which one depends on partnership agreement)show willingness to play in diamonds.

A common agreement is that 3H or 4H over a minor overcall are pass or correct bids.

Overcalls in a major suit are more awkward to handle, but a common agreement is that opener must double or bid should he hold the strong option, clarifying type if he or she has 2 of those.

== Defense ==
There are numerous popular defenses to multi 2 diamonds. The "Dixon" method below is not necessarily best from a technical point of view, however it is perfectly adequate and is easy to remember. In general, when defending against multi 2 diamonds, players should assume that the opener holds one of the weak options, as they occur much more frequently than the strong ones.

With a good suit, it is important to bid aggressively on the first round of bidding, before opener's partner has disambiguated the opening. Otherwise, it is often wise to wait until it is apparent what opener's suit is. In this mode, the second hand passes initially. A takeout double of the pass or correct response then becomes key on the next round of bidding.

It is helpful to discuss the concept of "position"(i.e. relative to opener) in any defence agreement. After the right hand opponent bids multi 2 diamonds,

- A double shows a balanced hand with 13-15 HCP or any hand with 19+ HCP, with strength being clarified by subsequent bidding (the hand will usually pass if it has the lower range or bid again with the higher).
- 2 of a suit is natural, showing opening values with a 5-card major
- 3 of a minor is natural, showing opening values with a sound 5-card or better minor. (Guaranteeing a sound suit facilitates partner calling 3NT holding at least a positional guard in both majors).
- 2NT is natural, usually with a guard in both majors.
- Higher bids are strong and sound in any suit called.

After left hand opponent bids multi 2 diamonds,

- A double of 2 of a major by opener’s responder, or of subsequent correction to spades by either partner, are for takeout.
- Other "bids are similar to if right hand opponent opened. It is important not to pass with opening values in case no later opportunity arises.

== Other "Multi" openings ==
2♣may also be used as a Multi opening. It is most commonly seen in conjunction with Benjaminised Acol, where a 2♦ opening is strong. 2♣ strong options might be either the game forcing, or Acol Two hand types.

Depending on regulations, the weak option is usually ambiguous with respect to major, but a weak, 5+ diamonds type might be allowed.

Tartan two bids allow multi-like openings in the majors, showing either a strong two bid in the suit, a weak two-suiter including that suit, or optionally a strong balanced hand, combining Acol Twos with a Lucas Two. A significant disadvantage is the inability to stop at the 2 level with the weak hand type.
