= Forcing bid =

Call that obliges the partner to bid over an intermediate opposing pass

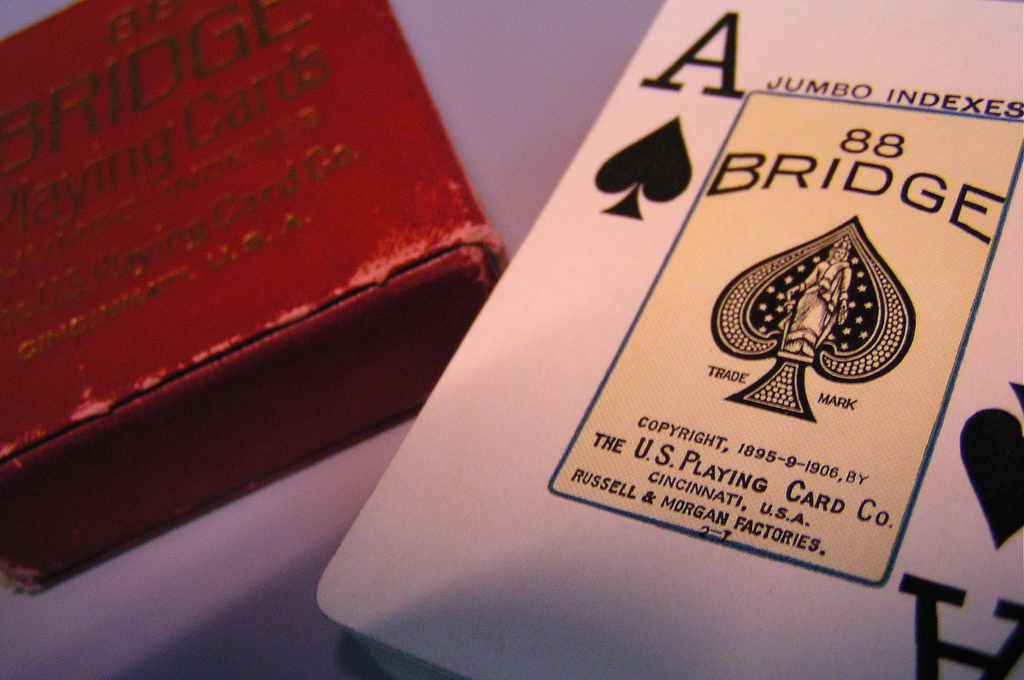
U.S Playing Card Co bridge cards from 1906 featuring jumbo indexes.

In the card game contract bridge, a forcing bid is any call that obliges the partner to bid over an intermediate opposing pass. Owing to the partnership's bidding system or a bridge convention, partner must "keep the bidding open", i.e. not pass, thereby preventing his left-hand opponent from ending the auction with a pass and enabling the "forcing bidder" to bid further.

A forcing bid that creates no further obligation is called forcing for one round. A bid that is forcing and promises a rebid creates an obligation on the forcing bidder next round (typically, up to some level of the auction). A game forcing bids creates a mutual obligation to continue bidding at least to game level, or to double the opponents.

All bridge bidding systems use forcing bids. For instance, one over one and two over one responses to one-of-a-suit opening bids are treated as forcing in almost all bidding systems. Also, introducing a new suit at three level is generally treated as forcing provided this bid is made in a non-limited hand. The main reason it is necessary to have certain bids in the system designated as forcing is to allow the partnership to start a dialogue exploring for the right contract.

Partnership agreement on which bids are forcing is essential. This is no easy territory, as is exemplified by the fact that in certain auctions even a pass can be forcing. In particular, the following bidding situations require agreement as to their forcing character, i.e. non-forcing, round forcing or forcing to a specified level:

- responses to preempts
- responses to overcalls
- various responses to a reverse bid of opener
- 2NT in competitive bidding situations

== See also ==
- Forcing pass
