= Raptor convention =

The Raptor 1NT overcall over an opposing 1-level suit opening is a contract bridge convention that indicates a two-suited hand with exactly four cards in the unbid major and a longer suit in an unbid minor.

The idea of utilising a 1NT overcall to denote a 5-4 two suiter seems to have originated independently in Sweden and Poland in the early 1980s. The name, however, comes from Ron Sutherland and his son who re-invented this approach and published it in a Toronto magazine in 1993 under the acronym "wRAP around TORonto" style.

When playing Raptor, an overcall of 1NT shows a 4 card major and a longer (5+) card minor. One of these suits will be known. For example: (1♣) – 1NT shows 5+ diamonds and a 4 card major. (1♥) – 1NT shows 4 spades and a 5 card minor.

Strength is a matter for partnership agreement. Compared with a natural 2-level overcall, the Raptor 1NT may be safe with fewer points, as it promises two places to play, and it may have a wider range, as it is forcing.

Followups:

- A bid of the known suit is to play.
- If the major suit is known, then advancer's cue bid shows a limit raise of the major (or better)
- If the major suit is unknown, then advancer's cue bid requests that overcaller bid his major, and may be weak.
- If the minor suit is unknown, 2♣ asks overcaller to pass (with clubs) or correct to 2♦.
- Other bids tend to show values in the suit, and suggest it as trump even if the overcaller is short.

== See also ==
- Unusual notrump
- Michaels cuebid
- Ghestem
- Takeout double
