= Unusual vs. unusual =

Bridge (game) strategy

Unusual vs. unusual is a competitive bidding convention used in contract bridge by the opening side after an opponent has made an overcall showing two suits (e.g. a Michaels cuebid or an Unusual notrump overcall).

== Description ==
The Unusual vs unusual convention is used after opponents have made an overcall that specifies two suits, for example using:

- The Unusual notrump convention which shows the two lowest unbid suits
- A so-called comprehensive system (such as Ghestem or Questem) where any two-suited combination can be shown
- A Michaels cuebid after a one-level opening in a minor showing both majors

The convention does not apply where only one suit is specified, for example:

- Michaels cuebid after a one-level opening in a major which promises the other major and an unspecified minor

For completeness a defense to use when a single suit is bid is shown below.

Both suits are specified

- A three-level bid in partner's suit is constructive (7-10 HPC) and non-forcing
- A bid in a suit which has not yet been bid by either opponent is competitive without showing game interest.
  - In some auctions the new suit will have to be bid at the three level - responder should only do this with a good suit of six or more cards and with two or fewer cards supporting partner
- A cuebid of the opponents’ lower ranking suit shows an invitational limit raise of partner's suit with a likely five-card side suit in the other nonadverse suit.
- A cuebid of the opponents’ higher ranking suit shows a game forcing raise with a likely five-card side suit in the other nonadverse suit.
- A double shows the ability to penalize at least one of the opponent's two specified suits. Any subsequent double by the partnership is for penalty.

Only one suit is specified

- A bid in partner's suit or a new nonadverse suit is competitive without showing game interest.
- A cuebid of the opponents’ known suit shows a raise of partner's suit. The raise is invitational limit raise or stronger. The cue bid raise implies a five-card side suit (probably, not the overcaller's unspecified second suit).
- A double shows the ability to penalize at least one of the opponent's implied suits. Any subsequent double by the partnership is for penalty
  - The player holding length in a suit bid naturally by the opponents should double

== Variations ==
There are several variations that are subject to partnership agreement including:

- In the version on the ACBL site, a cuebid in clubs always shows hearts and a cuebid in diamonds always shows spades. So if opener has bid one spade, a cuebid of three clubs over Unusual 2NT shows five hearts and invitational values, while a cuebid in diamonds shows a limit raise in spades.
- Reversing the cuebids:
  - A cuebid of the opponents’ higher ranking suit shows an invitational limit raise of partner's suit with a likely five-card side suit in the other nonadverse suit.
  - A cuebid of the opponents’ lower ranking suit shows a game forcing raise with a likely five-card side suit in the other nonadverse suit.
- Only showing the strength of support for partner, with cuebids, without promising any length in the other unbid suit
- Only one cuebid shows support (partnership agreement on which)
  - One cuebid shows a limit raise or better
  - The other cuebid shows the other, nonadverse suit and game interest
    - With the other suit and less than game interest responder bids their suit
- A jump cuebid is a splinter bid in the bid suit
- With a 10+ card major fit (e.g. 5+ playing five-card majors) with opener and less than game values responder bids the major at the four level
  - Playing four-card majors some partnerships would bid a major at the four level with five or more card support and an unbalanced hand on the assumption that if the overcaller is 5-5 and responder is unbalanced, opener is unlikely to have a balanced hand and therefore is most likely to have opened a five-card suit
- Raises show either four-card or longer trump support or three-card support with a splinter in a known, adverse suit. Since the overcaller with the two-suited hand probably has a short holding in the opening side's trump suit, one expects the adversely held trumps to break unevenly. Thus, the opening side should have either nine or more trumps or good ruffing values in the hand with short trumps.

== Advantages and disadvantages ==
This convention is an application of the Useful Space Principle and where a meaning is assigned to all available bids and therefore no bidding space is wasted. In some auctions there is an advantage to the opening team taking away bidding space from the overcalling team. In other cases the advancer might have no support for the overcall's suit but still have to make a preference bid, in this case the responder's bid means they can pass with the possibility that the opening side will be playing a three-level contract with a misfit.

The only bid lost is the Negative double (if used by the partnership) to show precisely three-card support for partner. There is also the general disadvantage to more complex bidding systems that will be used relatively infrequently and have different meanings to different partnership: the impact of a misunderstanding within a partnership might prove more costly than the potential benefits.
