= 2/1 game forcing =

Contract bridge bidding system employing 2/1 as game forcing

2/1 game forcing (Two-over-one game forcing) is a bidding system in modern contract bridge structured around the following responses to a one-level opening bid:

1. a non-jump response in a new suit at the one-level is constructive and forcing for one round,
2. a non-jump response in a new suit at the two-level is forcing to game, and
3. a 1NT response to a major opening is forcing for one round and indicates insufficient values to immediately commit to game or bid a suit at the one-level.

The 2/1 game force does not apply to responses by a passed hand, or if there is an intervening call by an opponent. Other responses are per Standard American methods in accordance with partnership agreement.

== Game forcing auctions ==
The 2/1 auctions are: 1♦–2♣, 1♥–2♣, 1♥–2♦, 1♠–2♣, 1♠–2♦, and 1♠–2♥.

=== Variations ===
The following variations may be made by partnership agreement:

- Some play that 1♦–2♣ is not game forcing
- Some play that 2/1 is not absolutely game forcing and the pair can stop below game when responder rebids his suit. For example, 1♥–2♣; 2♥–3♣ may be treated as nonforcing.

== 1NT response to major suit opening ==
Because the two-level responses are stronger than in Standard American bidding, the response of 1NT is forcing for one round and is used (among other things) for weaker hands containing low-ranking suits. Since the 1NT response is forcing, hands with a three-card limit raise can start with 1NT and later jump-support partner. See Forcing notrump for additional details. Some pairs play a variant in which the 1NT response to 1♥ or 1♠ is semi-forcing.

Since opener has been forced to rebid on hands which he might otherwise have passed, he may have to rebid in a new suit with only three or even two cards.

== Other features ==
Use of the 2/1 system usually implies (at least) the following additional agreements:

- Five card majors, i.e. major suit openings require at least a five-card suit;
- Either limit raises of major suit openings (i.e. the jump raise 1♠ – 3♠ or 1♥ – 3♥ shows a game-invitational hand with at least four-card support) or Bergen raises;
- Inverted minor raises, in which a jump raise of a minor suit opening is a weak preemptive bid, while a single raise is strong and forcing for one round;
- Jacoby 2NT, showing strong support with 4 or more cards;
- Splinter bids;
- New minor forcing;
- Fourth suit forcing and artificial.

== Examples ==
1♠ – 2♣
2♦ – 2♠
Forcing to game, with original spade support and good club suit. This is different from standard bidding, in which such a sequence would show about 10 points, and club suit could be semi-fake.

1♠ – 2♣
2♠ – 2NT.
Forcing to game, with balanced hand and a good club suit.

1♠ – 2♣
2♦ – 3♣
Forcing, unless the partnership has agreed that this is an exception to the "2/1 rule."

1♦ – 2♣
Forcing for one round only (as in Standard American), except in the variant of 2/1 where this sequence is game forcing as well.

1♣ – 2♣
Forcing for one round; 10 points or more with at least four clubs.

1♣ – 3♣
Weak; 9 points or less—sometimes much less—with at least five clubs.

1♥ – 2♥
Weak; 6-9 points with at least 3 hearts (unless Bergen raises are in use, in which case it shows precisely 3 hearts)

1♠ – 1NT;
2♣ – 2♠
Shows a weak hand, 6-9 points, with precisely two spades. Some also use this for an extremely weak hand (0-5) with three spades.

1♠ – 1NT;
2♣ – Pass
Shows a very weak hand, perhaps 5-7 points, with at least four clubs.

1♠ – 1NT;
2♣ – 2♦
Shows a weak hand, 5-9 points, with a long diamond suit.

1♠ – 1NT;
2♦ – 2♥
Shows a weak hand, 5-9 points, with a long heart suit.

1♠ – 1NT;
2♥ – 3♣
Shows a weak hand, 5-9 points, with a long club suit.

1♠ – 1NT;
2♣ – 2NT;
Shows 10-11 points without support for spades.

1♠ – 1NT;
2♣ – 3♠
Shows 10-11 points with 3-card support for spades.

1♠ – 3♠
Shows 10-11 points with at least 4-card support for spades.

1♠ – 1NT;
2♣ – 3♥
Shows 10-11 points with a long heart suit.

1♦ – 2♥
This is a jump response, and there are different ways of handling it. In Standard American, such a "jump shift" shows a very strong hand and is unequivocally forcing. However, since such hands do not occur with great frequency, it is more common today to use such a bid to show a weak hand with a long suit, unsuitable for defense. Another possibility is to play it as a "fit-showing jump", showing 8-10 points, a decent heart suit, and good diamond support.
