= Balancing (bridge) =

Bidding tactic in the game of bridge

In the game of contract bridge, balancing (or protection in Britain) refers to making a call other than Pass when passing would result in the opponents playing at a low level. Balancing is done by the player in the balancing position, i.e. to the right of the player making the last non-pass call. This is in contrast to bidding in the direct position, i.e. by the player to the left. Balancing is normally done with values unsuitable for direct action, but only after the opponents' bidding has demonstrated weakness or minimal strength. The aim of the tactic is to find a makeable or nearly-makeable contract for one's own side or to "push" opponents a level higher. It is more common in matchpoint games, where even a defeat and loss of 100 points is a relatively better result than the opponents' gain of 110-140 points.

== Examples ==
=== After an opening bid is passed by responder ===
Balancing situation result from sequences like:

West	North	East	South
1♥	Pass	Pass	?

Note that a Pass in this balancing position would result in defense against a 1♥ contract. The player in the balancing position, knows that the opener has made a non-forcing bid and that the opener's partner has denied values required to respond. In such a situation, it is probable that the opponents have less than half of the high-card strength. It is important to be able to enter the bidding on hands in which one has about 9-11 high card points (HCP). Therefore, in balancing position, either a takeout double or 1NT overcall can be made on less values than in direct position.

Mike Lawrence gave a detailed account of the various balancing situations in his Complete Book on Balancing in Contract Bridge. He stressed the fact that balancing over a minor suit is markedly different from balancing over a major suit. The difference stems from the fact that on a minor suit you can double and - after partner's response at 1-level - can rebid 1NT with 15-17 HCP. However, on a takeout double over a major suit, partner will seldom bid at the 1-level. As a result, the 1NT overcall over a major suit needs to be stronger.

The following summarises the balancing agreements made by competitive bridge players:

Balancing Over a Minor Suit Opening
West	North	East	South (in the balancing position)	
West	North	East	Call	Meaning
1♦	Pass	Pass	Double	8+ HCP
1♦	Pass	Pass	1♥/♠	normal overcall
1♦	Pass	Pass	1NT	10-14 HCP, does not guarantee a stopper
1♦	Pass	Pass	2♣	normal overcall
1♦	Pass	Pass	2♦	unknown two-suiter (see Michaels cuebid)
1♦	Pass	Pass	2♥/♠	good 6+ card, 12-16 hcp
1♦	Pass	Pass	2NT	18-19 HCP, balanced

Balancing Over a Major Suit Opening
West	North	East	South (in the balancing position)	
West	North	East	Call	Meaning
1♥	Pass	Pass	Double	8+ HCP
1♥	Pass	Pass	1♠	normal overcall
1♥	Pass	Pass	1NT	12-16 HCP, does not guarantee a stopper
1♥	Pass	Pass	2♣/♦	normal overcall
1♥	Pass	Pass	2♥	unknown two-suiter (see Michaels cuebid)
1♥	Pass	Pass	2♠	good 6+ card, 12-16 hcp
1♥	Pass	Pass	2NT	17-19 HCP, balanced

=== In later rounds ===
Balancing can be also executed in later rounds of bidding, in the sequences where the opponents have found a fit but stopped at a low-level. Normally, it is performed with some values, but less than if it was in direct seat. The opponents' fit requirement is important: statistically, existence of one side's 8+ cards fit favors the possibility that their opponents also have one (see Law of total tricks). Also, the opponents fit gives a clue to the partner's length in the suit, and, by inference from previous rounds of bidding, in other suits.

Bidding	South Holding	Comment
West / North / East / South; / / 1♥ / Pass; 2♥ / Pass / Pass / ?	♠ J1084 ♥ 8 ♦ A982 ♣ QJ63	South was too weak to give a takeout double in the first round, but the bidding now places some points with partner, and a likely fit in some suit
West / North / East / South; / / 1♥ / Pass; 2♥ / Pass / Pass / ?	♠ KQ108 ♥ 8532 ♦ A82 ♣ J6	South can now venture 2♠ overcall, judging that the partner has singleton heart and some values, so even a 4-3 fit could play well.
West / North / East / South; 1♦ / Pass / 1♥ / Pass; 2♥ / Pass / Pass / ?	♠ 108642 ♥ 83 ♦ A98 ♣ QJ6	A hand too weak for initial overcall might now try a 2♠, as partner is marked with some values.
West / North / East / South; 1♦ / Pass / 1♥ / Pass; 2♦ / Pass / Pass / ?	♠ 10864 ♥ AJ6 ♦ 98 ♣ KJ103	Although the distribution and strength are fine, opponents have not found a fit, and balancing can be dangerous; no fit from partner is implied, and East may have passed with significant values in fear of a misfit.
West / North / East / South; 1NT / Pass / 2♦ / Pass; 2♥ / Pass / Pass / ?; Jacoby transfer	♠ 10864 ♥ 5 ♦ KQ65 ♣ J1094	This is a fairly extreme case, but a takeout double might be ventured at matchpoints. The partner is marked with values which lie behind 1NT opener, although he might fail to provide a fit or expect more from the balancer and pass for penalties.

=== Balancing in direct seat ===
Although the "balancing in direct seat" term is self-contradictory, it is occasionally possible to have the "balancing values", yet to act relatively safely in the direct seat. The classic case is after the opponents have found a fit at the two level:

Bidding

West	North	East	South
			Pass
1♥	Pass	2♥	?

South Holding
♠ 10963 ♥ 8 ♦ A8532 ♣ KQ8
Comment
South can see that the partner is not short in hearts and is unlikely to balance over 2♥, so a takeout double is in order. A prior partnership agreement for light actions is in order.

It can also occur when the LHO has bid a sign-off without a clear fit, though this is not recommended due to the danger of not landing in a fit after the "pre balance". The tactics/convention is often referred to as "OBAR BIDS" (acronym for "Opponents Bid And Raise - Balance In Direct Seat").
