= Texas transfer =

Texas transfer, or simply Texas, is a bidding convention in contract bridge designed to get the partnership to game in a major suit opposite a one notrump or two notrump opening, thus making the opener declarer and keeping the stronger hand hidden from the opponents. Texas is used in response to a notrump opening when holding a six-card or longer major suit and at least game-going features; responder may have interest in slam via continuations in Blackwood or its variants. Originated independently by David Carter of St. Louis and Olle Willner of Sweden.

After a notrump opening, responder bids the suit below his major at the four-level, i.e. if he holds hearts, he bids 4♦ and if he holds spades, he bids 4♥. Opener is obliged to bid the next available major suit, i.e. after a 4♦ bid by responder, he bids 4♥ and after a 4♥ response, he bids 4♠ setting the contract.

The standard defense to the Texas transfer: double is one-suited and lead-directing, 4NT is for the minors, five of responder’s suit is a Michaels cuebid. A delayed double after opener accepts the transfer is a three-suited takeout.

Transfers at a lower level (Jacoby transfers) were developed from Texas transfers and occur on a much larger number of hands.

== Example ==
West is dealer		♠♤	AJ732		
West is dealer		♥	4		
West is dealer		♦	J96		
West is dealer		♣♧	K963		
♠♤	Q4	N W E S		♠♤	1095
♥	AK8	N W E S		♥	Q1076532
♦	A1053	N W E S		♦	82
♣♧	Q872	N W E S		♣♧	5
		♠♤	K86		
		♥	J9		
		♦	KQ74		
		♣♧	AJ104		

West	North	East	South
1NT	Pass	4♦!	Pass
4♥	Pass	Pass	Pass

The 4♦ response is the Texas transfer conventional bid, is alertable and requires opener to rebid 4♥.

This effective pre-emptive sequence by East-West gives North-South no convenient way to discover their eight-card spade fit and a plausible 4♠ contract.

== Variations ==
The natural-sounding sequence 1NT - 4♥ can pose a memory problem where a forgetful opener may pass the 4♥ transfer bid. In the variant known as South African Texas, responses of 4♣ and 4♦ are used as transfers to hearts and spades respectively. With minor suit bids being more distinctive, opener is more likely to recognize them as the partnership agreement requesting a transfer to a major. A disadvantage is that the use of a 4♣ bid as ace-asking Gerber is no longer available.

A comparable transfer convention often known as Namyats employs the 4♣ and 4♦ opening pre-emptive bids as transfers to 4♥ and 4♠ respectively as a slightly different hand type (usually stronger) compared to a direct 4♥ or 4♠ opening.

A further advantage of South African Texas / Namyats is that partner can break the transfer to show slam interest.

== Interference ==
Texas transfers may be used after the opponents overcall the notrump opening, usually through to the three spade level but that if the overcall is at the four level, all bids by responder are natural.

== See also ==
- Jacoby transfer
- Bidding system
- Glossary of contract bridge terms
