= Support double =

In contract bridge, the support double is a bridge convention used to distinguish between three-card and four-card support for partner's suit response to one's opening bid in the scenario where his response is either overcalled or doubled by the opponents. A call of two in partner's suit indicates four-card support and a call of double promises three-card support; if partner's suit bid is doubled instead of overcalled, a redouble serves the same meaning as double. The convention was invented by Eric Rodwell in 1974.

For example, after 1♦ - (Pass) - 1♥ - (1♠)

- Double shows three-card heart support
- 2♥ shows four-card heart support
- Pass or other bids: fewer than three hearts

A support redouble applies when Right Hand Opponent makes a take-out double of the response of one of a major: 1♦ - (Pass) - 1♠ - (Double)

- Redouble: three-card spade support
- 2♠ shows four-card spade support
- Pass or other bids: fewer than three spades

The convention came as result of the scenario where in competitive auctions, the opening bidder would like to show his minimal three-card support for partner's suit on the possibility that partner has five or more cards in it. However, there would be a risk of a 4-3 fit, known as a Moysian fit which does not play as well as eight-card fits. Since the need to distinguish between three- and four-card support occurs more frequently than those cases where the opening bidder would like to make a penalty double over the opponent's one-level overcall, the meaning of the double (and redouble) was modified to convey the conventional meaning of three-card support.

== Usage ==
Take the following auction:

| West | North | East | South |
|---|---|---|---|
| Pass | 1♣ | Pass | 1♥ |
| 1♠ | Dbl | Pass | 1NT |
| Pass | | | |

Playing support doubles, North, the opener, has shown three-card support for South's 1♥ call. This is important because South might only have four hearts. Based on the South no trump bid, it can be assumed that South doesn't have five or more hearts.

Hand in hand with the support double is the support redouble which also shows three card support. Examine this auction, which is similar to the one above.

| West | North | East | South |
|---|---|---|---|
| Pass | 1♣ | Pass | 1♥ |
| Dbl | Rdbl | | |

North has shown three-card support for South's heart suit. South uses this information to form the next bid.

== Exceptions ==
Support doubles are not used (except by special agreement) by partner of an overcaller.

| West | North | East | South |
|---|---|---|---|
| 1♦ | 1♠ | 2♣ | Dbl |

The assumption is that the overcaller must surely have at least five cards in the suit he has bid. As such a simple raise is normally sufficient to show some points and support. In such a situation, a double by the partner of the overcaller would be treated as either a Rosenkranz double, a snapdragon double, a responsive double or a penalty double based on partnership agreement.

== At what level ==
The above examples show the support double's use over one-level overcalls. Partnerships usually decide to play support doubles through 2 Hearts or 2 Spades. Here are several other less discussed examples but nonetheless valid examples of normal support doubles

| West | North | East | South |
|---|---|---|---|
| Pass | 1♣ | 1 ♥ | 1♠ |
| 2 ♥ | Dbl | | |

Playing negative doubles or not, opener's double shows three spades. It is irrelevant that opener knows that partner has five spades (if playing negative doubles), the double shows three-card support. The principle is that you and your partner use the opponent's bidding to assist your bidding. Clarify right now if you have three- or four-card support unless you have something else very important to say.

| West | North | East | South |
|---|---|---|---|
| 1♦ | 1 ♥ | 2♣ | 2 ♦ |
| Dbl | | | |

In this case with a really competitive auction, someone is probably stretching their bid.

West has opened and his partner has shown five clubs and 10 points yet South is showing a limit raise of Hearts.

The double is still support. It is particularly important in this instance. BTW: The most likely culprit is South.

== Importance of nine-card fits ==
There is a lot of literature for advancing players on the importance of determining eight- versus nine-card fits. Here is one example of its importance: As East, your hand is xxxxx, xx, void, KQxxxx The auction is

| West | North | East | South |
|---|---|---|---|
| 1♣ | 1 ♥ | 1 ♠ | 2 ♥ |
| 2 ♠ | | | |

Without knowing RHO's next bid, if East knows there is a nine-card spade fit, East can bid 4 Spades even in an IMP game and expect a chance to make it. In the same auction, if a partner doubles showing exactly three spades, your bid now becomes a guess.

== ACBL rules ==
In American Contract Bridge League (ACBL) tournaments, support doubles must be indicated on the convention card and must be Alerted. Additionally, when opener makes a call other than a support double (including Pass) when the support double is an option, an Alert should be made if the partnership agreement is that opener's failure to double or to raise denies three-card or longer support for responder's suit (normally, one would expect only four-card or longer support to be denied by failure to raise responder's major suit). Per the "Alert Procedures" page on the ACBL website: "In general, when the use of conventions leads to unexpected understandings about suit length by negative inference, a natural call becomes Alertable." While the ACBL does make an exception for agreements that "have become expected and are fairly common," the fact that the ACBL continues to require an Alert for the support double itself argues against applying this exception; the requirement to Alert implies that the support double is not considered "expected... and fairly common" to date.

Most bridge clubs require a partnership to employ active ethics, and the partnership should disclose all relevant agreements to the opponents. Secret conventions are illegal.

== See also ==
- Negative double
- Negative free bid
- Takeout double
