= Unusual notrump =

Conventional overcall in bridge

In the card game of bridge, the unusual notrump is a conventional overcall showing a two-suited hand. It was originally devised by Al Roth in 1948 with Tobias Stone, to show the minor suits after the opponents opened in a major.

The convention concept is now generally extended to show the "two lowest unbid" suits. Thus, over 1♣, 2NT shows diamonds and hearts; and over 1♦, it shows clubs and hearts. In addition to succinctly describing the hand to the partner, it deprives the opponents of bidding space, i.e. it has a preemptive effect. A drawback is that it provides the opponents with information about the strength and distribution of the overcaller's hand, potentially enabling improved declarer play should they secure the contract.

== History ==
In his seminal 1953 book, The Roth-Stone System, Alvin Roth suggested that poor matchpoint scores usually result when the opponents are permitted to play low-level contracts and recommended protective bidding tactics for the player in the pass-out (balancing) seat in such auctions.

He advocated use of weak jump overcalls and responses at a time when the standard practice was for jump overcalls and responses to show strong hands. In one such application - when the opponents reach the two-level having bid only a major – he recommended an overcall of 2NT, as an artificial protective bid indicating,

- a probable 9 (or more) points.
- strong minor suit holding – 5-4, 5-5 or better – and a request for partner to choose between the minor suits. If necessary, responder must bid a three-card minor suit.
- a warning against bidding the unbid major (however, the unbid major may be bid if self-sufficient).

== Current usage ==
When an opponent opens the bidding with 1♥ or 1♠, the immediate overcall of 2NT shows at least 5–5 in the minor suits (that is, at least five clubs and at least five diamonds). If the right hand opponent (RHO) of the partner of the 2NT bid passes, that partner is expected to bid the minor suit that he prefers at the three-level. The unusual notrump applies the principle that when the natural meaning of a bid is not generally very useful, it is profitable to agree that it means something somewhat opposite. That is, while natural notrump bids show a strong hand with balanced distribution, the unusual notrump shows a weak hand with very unbalanced distribution.

If the 2NT bidder bids again freely, then it shows a strong two suiter. To distinguish the weak and strong holdings, many partnerships agree not to use the unusual notrump for intermediate hands (about 12 to 14 points); they would simply overcall with one of their suits and show the other later if the bidding offers a chance. However, for two-suiters, many players apply losing trick count (LTC) instead of point count, as it more accurately depicts the offensive trick-taking potential of the hand. With LTC in effect, the required strength is about 4.5–7 losers, the latter only in favorable vulnerability.

Similarly, a 4NT overcall shows an extreme two suiter (usually at least 6–5, often 6-6 or 7–6) and enough trick-taking potential so that a 5-level contract can be made, or a sacrifice will likely be profitable. It shows the same two suits as 2NT would show. Note that 4NT is "unusual" only when the opponents open the bidding; otherwise, 4NT is normally played as the Blackwood convention or a quantitative invitation to 6NT.

The Michaels cuebid is a similar convention which is used to show a two suiter with one or both major suits.

To counteract the unusual notrump, the opening side may employ unusual vs. unusual.

== Modifications ==
Recently, the Unusual 2NT has been used in opening seat showing a 5-5 minor suited hand and 7-11 HCP. The preemptive value of the two suited hand puts pressure on the opponents to find their fits, games and slams at the three level.

== Defense ==
When the opponents open or overcall with an Unusual 2NT, defense uses a bidding scheme which incorporates two features:

- the 'double' becomes available as an additional call
- the concept of a major-minor pairing is adopted whereby diamonds are associated with spades and clubs with hearts. A cuebid of the paired minor shows a good holding in the corresponding major while a bid of a major shows a weaker holding.

After an Unusual 2NT overcall of a major:

Opener	Overcaller	Responder	
Opener	Overcaller	Response	Meaning
1♥	2NT	Dbl	looking to penalize, no primary major fit
1♥	2NT	3♣	good raise in hearts (8 losers or better)
1♥	2NT	3♦	sound values in spades at the three level or better
1♥	2NT	3♥	weak raise in hearts but stretched (8½ to 9 losers)
1♥	2NT	3♠	six spades, not forcing
1♥	2NT	3NT	to play
1♥	2NT	4♣	splinter (singleton or void in clubs) in support of hearts
1♥	2NT	4♦	splinter (singleton or void in diamonds) in support of hearts
1♠	2NT	Dbl	looking to penalize, no primary major fit
1♠	2NT	3♣	sound values in hearts at the three level or better
1♠	2NT	3♦	good raise in spades (8 losers or better)
1♠	2NT	3♥	six hearts, not forcing
1♠	2NT	3♠	weak raise in spades but stretched (8½ to 9 losers)
1♠	2NT	3NT	to play
1♠	2NT	4♣	splinter (singleton or void in clubs) in support of spades
1♠	2NT	4♦	splinter (singleton or void in diamonds) in support of spades

After an Unusual 2NT opening:

Opener	Overcaller	
Opener	Response	Meaning
2NT	Dbl	able to penalize one of the minors or 20+ HCP
2NT	3♣	takeout for the majors, better hearts
2NT	3♦	takeout for the majors, better spades
2NT	3♥	single suited in hearts, opening hand values
2NT	3♠	single suited in spades, opening hand values

== Drawbacks ==
Use of the convention with insufficient strength or lengths (such as 5–4 in the minors) may lead to:

1. Opponents doubling and collecting more penalty points than the contract points they would otherwise have scored.
2. Opponents outbidding to obtain a major suit contract.
3. Opponents making a contract owing to the additional information gained about the strength and distribution of the hand of the unusual notrump bidder.

== See also ==
- Ghestem
