= Copenhagen convention (bridge) =

Contract bridge overcall

The Copenhagen convention in the game of contract bridge is a conventional overcall which shows a two-suited hand. It was first devised by Mr. John Trelde and Mr. Gert Lenk, both of Copenhagen, Denmark. While it is rarely used in North America (where Michaels cuebids are most popular), it is fairly popular in Europe, especially Denmark.

The requirement for a bid in the Copenhagen convention is a two-suited hand with at least five cards in each suit and typically an opening hand. Point count requirements vary, but it is commonly agreed that an overcall using this convention is constructive and should be made on hands that hold the prospect of winning the auction. When made on very weak hands, the chances are the opponents will win the auction and will have been warned about the unbalanced holding, leading to games that would not have been bid otherwise. Given that a bid using the Copenhagen convention is forcing for one round, most partnerships apply no upper limit to its high card strength.

To use the convention, when the opponents make a one level opening, you make one of three bids. To show the bottom two unbid suits, bid 2 NT. To show the top and bottom unbid suits, bid 3♣. To show the top two unbid suits, bid 3♦. If the opponents have bid two suits, both at the one level, then the only overcall is 2 NT, which shows the two unbid suits.

As opposed to Michaels cuebids, the 3♣ and 3♦ jump overcalls aren't available as natural bids. Bids at the two level (barring 2 NT) are natural. The Copenhagen convention is more precise in terms of uniquely defining the specific suits denoted than standard Michaels cuebids. However, the lowest level the hand can be played at is the three level, and rarely will a nine card trump suit fit be found. This goes against the Law of Total Tricks, which states the three level should have at least a nine card fit. The Ghestem convention and its variants have similar advantages but also allow some fits to be found at the two level by using a cuebid at the 2 level rather than 3♦.

== See also ==
- Michaels cuebid
- Ghestem
