= Rusinow leads =

Convention in the game of contract bridge

Rusinow leads is a bridge convention used as part of defensive carding. Rusinow leads are commonly used only on the opening lead against a suit contract; nevertheless, some experts use Rusinow leads only against notrump.

They were devised by Sydney Rusinow and used by him, Philip Abramsohn and Simon Rossant in the 1930s, but were banned until 1964 by the American Contract Bridge League.

== Application ==
Using Rusinow leads against a suit contract, the second highest honour card is led from touching honours against a suit contract. So from ♥KQ94, a player using Rusinow leads would lead the queen. This eliminates the ambiguity of the more traditional lead of the king against a suit contract where the partner of the leader may not be clear whether his partner has the ace or the queen.

Accordingly,

- the lead of the ace denies the king except with A-K doubleton.
- the lead of the king is made from a holding headed by A-K. Third hand should encourage holding the queen or a doubleton.
- the queen is led from holdings headed by K-Q. Third hand should encourage with the ace or jack, but not with a doubleton if dummy has three or four low cards. Declarer may duck, and partner may continue into his A-J.
- the jack is led from holdings headed by Q-J; 10 from holdings headed by J-10 and 9 from holdings headed by 10-9.

If the touching honors to be led are doubleton, the top card should be led. Then when the second honor is played, partner will know that the leader has no more of that suit.

With more than two honors in sequence, the second highest is still led (queen from K-Q-J, etc.), followed by a lower one in most cases. These leads blend nicely into Middle Upside Down (MUD) leads of second highest from three spot cards.

Rusinow leads are used only on the first trick against a suit contract in a suit partner has not bid. Later in the hand, or in partner’s suit, the highest card should be led from touching honors.

== See also ==
- Journalist leads
- Opening leads
- Rule of 10-12
- Rule of 11
