= Forcing notrump =

Bidding convention in bridge

The forcing notrump is a bidding convention in the card game of bridge.

In Standard American bidding, the response of 1NT to an opening bid of 1♥ or 1♠ shows 6 to 9 high card points (HCP) and is non-forcing. Opener, with a balanced minimum, may pass the 1NT response and, if the opponents also pass, that will become the contract.

A partnership may agree that this bid is forcing for one round; if the intervening opponent passes, opener must bid at least once more. This guarantees the responder at least one more opportunity to bid or pass. This mechanism allows the partnership to use the 1NT response for a greater variety of hands: in particular, invitational as well as minimum responder holdings. The forcing notrump is used over major suits only; 1NT is always standard and non-forcing over the minor suits.

The forcing 1NT bid shows 6 to 12 HCP, denies the ability to make a single raise (but not necessarily an invitational raise), and denies holding four spades if the opening bid was 1♥; it must be announced as "forcing" by partner.

As the forcing notrump creates problems of its own, a popular variation that overcomes these is the forcing next step.

== Opener's rebid ==
Opener is forced to bid again:

- two of original major shows a six-card suit
- two of a lower-ranking suit shows a second suit (which of necessity may be short - see below)
- 2NT is natural and invitational (showing about 18 HCP)
- three of a new suit (jump shift) is natural, normally agreed to be game-forcing, and shows about 19 points or more

When opener does not have a six-card original suit nor a four-card lower-ranking second suit, she will have to bid a short suit. Normally, she bids her three-card minor. If she has three cards in both minors, she bids 2♣.

If opener holds exactly four spades, five hearts, two diamonds and two clubs (and thus originally opened 1♥), she bids 2♣, a two-card suit. There is no point in showing the spades, because responder has denied holding four spades (having skipped the 1♠ response to bid 1NT). After a 1♠ opening, however, there is no distribution that would compel opener to rebid a two-card suit.

Some partnerships agree not to rebid a two-card suit, preferring to promise a minimum of three cards. This allows responder to pass with zero or one hearts and four or more clubs. Instead, these partnerships rebid 2♥ (violating rule #1), or pass (if playing Semi-forcing notrump.)

The forcing next step variation (discussed below) overcomes these problems by allowing opener to show a balanced hand, or any second suit and guarantee four cards in it, yet still offer the option of playing in two of the major.

== Responder's rebid ==
Responder categorizes her hand as either minimum (6-9 HCP) or invitational (10-12 HCP).

The minimum responder rebids are:

- two of opener's original major (shows two-card support)
- two of a new suit (shows a five-card or longer suit; some play a six-card or longer suit)
- pass denies either of the above (shows a distinct preference for opener's second-bid suit)

The invitational responder rebids are:

- three of opener's original major (shows exactly a three-card limit raise)
- three of a new suit (shows a six-card or longer suit)
- 2NT (natural)
- three of opener's second suit (shows at least four-card support)
- over a first suit of hearts unusual 2♠ may apply (see below)

Variation. There is more than one school of thought for responder's second call. The above text represents only one theory. Another widely utilized theory is:

With a minimum (6-9 support points):

- pass (or raise) holding five or more cards in the suit bid: exception - see false preference.
- bid openers first suit with two-card support: exception see false preference.
- pass holding four or more cards in the current suit bid
- with a six-card or longer suit with reasonable top-cards in the suit, bid that if it is between the current suit and two of openers suit. Example: (opponents passing) 1♥ – 1NT; 2♣ – ?. 2♦ would fit this bid, but 2♠ would not (as the responder would have bid 1♠ the first time, see Unusual two spades below)
- if none of these options work, usually pass with three in the current suit, otherwise bid openers first suit false preference (see below) may apply.

== Further bidding ==
When responder rebids two of a new suit, opener should pass with a minimum and two or more cards in the suit. With a singleton or void in responder's suit, opener should rebid her original major. Responder may yet have a doubleton there and pass, or will be able correct to three of opener's second suit or her own good six-card (or longer) suit. In this way, the partnership is normally assured of at least a seven-card fit.

After an invitational responder rebid, opener is expected to pass (or sign off below game) with a minimum opening hand, or to bid game with extra values.

In line with the above Variation, when responder bids their own suit it is 'drop-dead', and Pass should be the expected response. However, with a good hand and three-card or more support, a raise may be appropriate. Otherwise, the only reason to bid should be a good hand with no cards in the bid suit, and extra length in one of the first two suits, as partner has at most one card in our major and three cards in our minor.

== Tactical raise ==
When responder has a very weak hand (0-4 points), but yet support for opener's major (three or more cards), standard bidding dictates a pass (because opener may have a very good hand and get over-enthused after a single raise). This may allow the opponents to get into the bidding at a low level. Playing the forcing notrump, however, it is sometimes tactically advantageous to bid 1NT with this hand and then correct to 2 of opener's major. The 1NT bid tends to shut out the opponents and make partner cautious at the same time.

== System implications ==
The forcing notrump is generally used by players using the 2/1 game forcing system, but may be used to advantage by other players as well.

== False preference ==
When in the maxi-minimum range (8-9 support points), and holding two cards in opener's major and five cards in opener's minor, you are worried about passing and missing game when partner has some extra-values. So you take 'preference' to two of opener's major. This keeps the bidding alive and allows partner to take another call even though your preference would in fact be for the minor.

When in the mini-minimum range (6-7 support points) and holding two cards in opener's major and four cards in opener's minor, you Pass. Even though the 'rule' says to prefer the major, the last thing you need is for partner to take another bid with extra values. By passing in a known fit, you hope to ensure the partnership a plus score.

== Unusual two spades ==
Specific to the auctions: 1♥ – 1NT - 2♣ and 1♥ – 1NT - 2♦. In these auctions responder is known to have fewer than 4 spades. Thus, a call of 2♠ would have no sensible meaning. In these situations the raise of partner's minor is a slightly weaker hand, and the 2♠ bid is a 'power' raise to opener's minor, usually based on five or more of partners minor and invitational values.

== Semi-forcing notrump ==
As a variation, some partnerships choose to play their 1NT response as semi-forcing. The rebids and subsequent auctions are the same as with the forcing notrump, except that the opener is allowed to pass with a 5-3-3-2 minimum and no interest in game opposite a limit raise (including three-card support for opener's major).

This changes follow-up auctions in that opener is assumed to either have four or more cards in any new suit bid, or some extra values when holding only three cards in a newly bid minor.

== Forcing next step ==
With this approach, the next step bid over the major open is forcing and unspecified. "Forcing next step," also known as the "Kaplan Inversion", is a mid-chart convention in the ACBL.

- 1♠ - 1NT is forcing, unspecified
- 1♥ - 1♠ is forcing, with responder having 0-4 spades
- 1♥ - 1NT is forcing with responder showing 5+ spades.

One immediate benefit of this is that the correct major fit can be found. In standard forcing notrump, responder with five spades bids 1♠ over opener's 1♥ but if she also has 2 hearts she does not then know whether to rebid 2♥ or 2♠. In forcing next step, opener will raise 1♥ - 1NT to 2♠ if she has support, so if she makes another bid, responder can happily give preference to 2♥.

The forcing next step approach has the further benefit over the classic forcing notrump of allowing an opener with a balanced hand to define his point count range more tightly.

Here is a simple approach. Assuming the use of strong 1NT openings, the sequence 1♥ - 1♠ - 1NT would show a balanced 12-14 HCP with five hearts and 1♥ - 1♠ - 2NT would show 18-19 HCP with five hearts.

Here is a more complex approach: Over a sequence of 1♠ - 1NT, opener rebids:

- 2♣ = 12-16, four clubs, or balanced. (2♦ from responder finds out which, as well as the strength range.)
- 2♦/♥ = 12-16, four-card suit
- 2♠ = 12-16, six-card or longer suit
- 2NT = 17-18 balanced
- 3 any = 17+ natural

If responder wishes to know further about the 2♣ bid, she asks with 2♦. Opener rebids 2♥ = 12-14 balanced, 2♠ = 12-14 club suit, 2NT = 15-16 balanced, 3♣ = 15-16 clubs.

Similarly with a sequence starting 1♥ - 1♠, opener rebids:

- 1NT = 12-16, balanced, or four spades. (2♣ from partner finds out which, as well as the strength range.)
- 2♣/♦ = 12-16, four-card suit
- 2♥ = 12-16, six-card or longer suit
- 2NT = 17-18 balanced
- 3 any = 17+ natural

If responder wishes to know further about the 1NT bid, she asks with 2♣. Opener rebids 2♦ = 12-14 balanced, 2♥ = 12-14 spade suit, 2♠ = 15-16 spade suit, 2NT = 15-16 balanced. Note that if responder and opener both have four spades, they can still play in 2♠ in spite of the artificial response.
