= Bridge maxims =

Advice for playing contract bridge

A bridge maxim is a rule of thumb in contract bridge acting as a memory aid to best practice gained from experience rather than theory.

== Maxims ==
=== Bidding ===
- If you have a choice of reasonable bids and one of them is 3NT, then bid it – known as "Hamman's Law", devised by Bob Hamman.
- Prefer majors to minors. Bid a major suit before a minor suit. They can overbid opponents at the same level and score higher.
- Prefer length to strength. A long suit, even if weaker, is often ultimately more powerful and desirable as a contract than a short suit, however good, because long trumps will usually make tricks in the end, and they allow a greater level of control during the game.
- With a misfit, bid cautiously; with a good fit, bid boldly. Avoids chasing a poor contract with a misfit, but enables a surprisingly high contract with a good fit.

=== Card play ===
==== Declarer ====
- Eight ever, nine never. This refers to guidance for the common situation where declarer has eight or nine cards in a suit including the Ace and King, and is trying to choose a strategy for drawing the opponents' queen without losing a trick.

There are two strategies - the finesse, which is 50-50 in both cases, and the drop, which relies upon the opponent who has the queen having only one or two (but not more) cards in the suit, and becomes more likely to succeed the more cards in the suit are held.

Lacking any further information, the maxim suggests that optimal strategy is to finesse when holding a total of eight cards in the suit, and do not finesse but play the two top cards to cause the queen to be "dropped" if nine cards are held.

Advanced players will often try to gain further information or deduce which hand holds the queen, before choosing their play. The difference in percentages is so close (the Bridge Encyclopedia states that the finesse is a 50% probability of success holding 8 cards, while the drop has a 53% holding 9 cards) that the slightest inference might influence a player to choose to finesse or to drop with nine cards.

"Eight ever nine never" refers only to when declarer can afford no loser in the suit: there are many more things for them to think about when declarer can afford a loser. For example, if the finesse would land in the hand of the dangerous opponent who can give the other opponent a ruff that declarer cannot afford, with eight cards they might have to play for a "drop" by playing the ace and king then a small one to the jack. Even if the finesse would have lost, now the dangerous opponent cannot give their partner a ruff, because they cannot have any more trumps left (if the queen did not fall under the ace and king, the potential ruffer cannot have more than two cards in the suit).

==== Defenders ====
- If in doubt, lead a spade. This applies to NT contracts and works on the assumption that declarer or dummy would likely bid spades if they had them. (Because it is axiomatic to consider a major suit fit if one exists, before settling on no trumps, and spades as the highest ranked suit are the suit which would have been easiest to bid had a fit existed.)
- Cover an honour with an honour. May set up a trick for partner, or prevent the opposition making a 'free' extra trick. Example: Suppose declarer (South) leads the Queen of a suit, dummy (North) has the Ace, and the hand in between (West) has the King. If West fails to play the King over the Queen, declarer will allow the Queen to make a trick, and then the Ace will also make a second trick. By playing the King, one ensures that declarer must use the Ace and Queen on the same trick, and cannot make a second trick with these cards. In addition, partner may now turn out to have the Jack doubleton, which will now be a winner. The same thing happens with partner having 10 to three cards or 9 to four cards. Their 10 or 9 will never make a trick if one does not cover.

However, it is best to use one's judgment: if the bidding or previous play suggests that partner cannot have the jack, 10 or 9, or enough cards for this card to be promoted (e.g. if they can only have two cards and one knows declarer has the jack, their 10 will still fall under one of declarer's cards whether one covers or not) then there is no point covering, as this will only help declarer by telling them where an important card is.

- Play into weakness and play through strength. Two versions on a similar theme: Gives partner more opportunity to take advantage of possible finessing situations (since partner will play after the strong hand). Likewise it may give partner more opportunity for tricks, or to win with a lower card, if the last hand (after they play a card) is known to be weak in the suit played. By leading into strength, one is finessing one's partner (they have to play before the strong hand).
- Second hand plays low. Prevents wastage of useful cards. This is because one's partner may be able to win the trick with a low card, and one does not accidentally finesse oneself. However, if one knows partner cannot possibly have a card capable of winning the trick and there is no reason why one does not want the lead or want the 1st player to remain on lead, one should not play 2nd hand low.
- Third hand plays high. Prevents opponent winning a trick cheaply and may help partner. This only applies if there will be a choice of cards to play for 4th player (silly to play one's king when 4th player has a singleton ace!) and there is a possibility of promoting something for one's partner. For example, they might have three cards with the jack, and 4th player has the ace and the queen. If one plays one's king, 4th player has to play the ace, and now the queen cannot drop partner's jack: it has been promoted.

== Principles ==
- Principle of fast arrival. In game forcing auctions, bidding game directly with a preemptive jump bid shows a limited minimum hand and no slam interest.
- Principle of restricted choice. The play of a particular card decreases the probability its player holds any equivalent card.
- Useful space principle, or USP. The Bridge World glossary defines USP as: "a partnership's assigning meanings to actions so that the remaining bidding space matches the needs of the auction."

== Rules of thumb ==
- Rule of Eleven
