= Ekren =

Ekren may refer to:

- Nazım Ekren (born 1956), Deputy Prime Minister of Turkey responsible for economic affairs
- Ekren convention, bridge term
