= Namyats =

In the card game bridge, Namyats is a conventional agreement to open hands with a long major suit that are too strong for a direct preemptive opening with a 'two-under' transfer bid. When the long suit is in hearts, opener bids 4♣, and when in spades, opener bids 4♦. Accordingly, the method was originally named 'Four Club and Four Diamond Opening Transfers'; it is also referred to as 'Mitchell Transfers', after the developer of this bidding method, Victor Mitchell. The name 'Namyats' is the surname of Mitchell's bridge partner, Samuel Stayman, spelled backwards. In England, this convention is known as 'South African Texas', a name borrowed from a similar variant on the Texas transfer convention played over 1NT opening bids.

Opener		Responder	
Bid	Meaning	Bid	Meaning
4♣	Opener has a long heart suit and a strong hand	4♦	slam interest
4♣	Opener has a long heart suit and a strong hand	4♥	to play
4♣	Opener has a long heart suit and a strong hand	6♥	to play
4♦	Opener has a long spade suit and a strong hand	4♥	slam interest
4♦	Opener has a long spade suit and a strong hand	4♠	to play
4♦	Opener has a long spade suit and a strong hand	6♠	to play

When playing Namyats, a one-suited hand containing a long solid major too strong for a preemptive opening, like ♠ 9 ♥ A K Q 10 8 6 5 3 ♦ 4 ♣ A J 7, is opened with a 4♣ bid. This allows the partnership to explore for slam by deploying a conventional one-step (4♦) relay response. When partner has no slam interest a two-step response is made that completes the bidding. Also, a slam can be bid directly over the opening with sufficient strength. The responses to both Namyats openings are summarised in the table.

The advantage of Namyats is that it allows the partnership to narrow the range of hands opened in a major suit at the one-level and rebid in a later round. Also, the method may prevent the opponents to enter the bidding despite having a cheap sacrifice against the major suit game indicated by the Namyats opening. Disadvantage is that the 4♣ and 4♦ bids are no longer available as preempts, although proponents of the method argue that this is hardly a disadvantage as such preempts are rarely invoked for fear of bypassing a making game in notrump. Alternatively, partnerships can describe these hands by adopting the Gambling 3NT convention.

== See also ==
- South African Texas
- Namyats description on Bridgehands
- Namyats description on BridgeGuys
- Truscott, Alan. "Alan Truscott on Namyats". The New York Times.
