= Rosenkranz double =

The Rosenkranz double and Rosenkranz redouble are elements of a bridge bidding convention invented by Dr. George Rosenkranz, collectively known as the Rosenkranz double. It is a double made by the advancer (partner of the overcaller) in an auction where opener, overcaller and responder have all bid different suits. It is used to describe the advancer's top honor card holdings in the overcaller's suit.

== Original version ==
The conventions come into play when the auction has started with: (a) an opening bid by the opponents; (b) a direct overcall by partner at the one-level; and (c) a bid or negative double (that is, not a Pass) by the opener's partner, responder. Two cases follow: (1) if responder bids below two of opener's suit, Double by advancer is a raise of the overcall and promises a top honor; (2) if responder doubles, Redouble by advancer has the same meaning. Either way, advancer's natural raise to the two-level denies possession of a top honor in that suit. A top honor is either the Ace, King or Queen.

Showing the top honor may allow the overcaller with a serrated holding to lead the suit safely; while denying the top honor (and thereby suggesting strength elsewhere) encourages the overcaller to lead a different suit.

== Reverse Rosenkranz ==
Subsequent to creating the Rosenkranz double and redouble, Rosenkranz announced in a letter published in the ACBL's Bridge Bulletin that he had adopted a proposal by Eddie Wold to switch the meaning of the two sequences, so that the advancer's immediate raise now showed the Ace, King or Queen honor, while the double (and redouble) denied it – a treatment known as "Reverse Rosenkranz". The term "Guildenstern" (alluding to Shakespeare's Rosencrantz and Guildenstern) is also used for these sequences, an independent creation of "Reverse Rosenkranz".

The reasoning for the reverse treatment is that a better hand for the bid suit (by virtue of the additional honor strength) should raise the level of the auction to make things difficult for the opponents.

== Variations ==
Munson (or "Tolerance Redoubles") is an alternative, created by Kitty Munson Cooper, in which the redouble shows shortness (one or two cards) including the ace or king. After a Munson redouble, overcaller's spot-card lead in his suit is a suit preference signal showing which side suit overcaller prefers partner to lead back (shift).

The Rosencranz redouble is also used to indicate a doubleton honor in overcaller's suit.

The Snapdragon double is a convention used by advancer when the other three players have shown three different suits without a jump. It shows length in the fourth (unbid) suit, and tolerance for partner's suit (10x or better).
