= Marty Bergen (bridge) =

American bridge expert

Marty A. Bergen (born April 21, 1948) is an American bridge teacher, writer and player. A ten-time national champion and American Contract Bridge League Grand Life Master, he retired from active competition in 1993. He is still a bridge teacher and writer and is a World Bridge Federation World International Master. He was recently voted to be the 22nd most influential person in the history of bridge.

Bergen has been a columnist in the monthly ACBL Bridge Bulletin since 1976. He has also written a total of 69 bridge books and booklets from 1995 to 2018 Two of his books won the ABTA Bridge Book of the Year award, Points Schmoints!: Bergen's Winning Bridge Secrets in 1996 and Declarer Play the Bergen Way in 2005.

Bergen is known for his development of many new conventions and treatments. His most popular ones are DONT, Bergen raises, 1NT semi-forcing and The Rule of 20. He and Larry Cohen were one of the most successful pairs in the 1980s, and they later were instrumental in educating players about the Law of Total Tricks.

Bergen is married to Cheryl Bergen née Lance and they reside in Palm Beach Gardens, Florida.

== Bridge accomplishments ==
=== Awards ===
- Herman Trophy 1983
- American Bridge Teachers' Association Book of the Year 1996, 2005
- Elected to Bridge Hall of Fame in 2022

=== Wins ===
- North American Bridge Championships (10)
  - Spingold (1) 1984
  - Reisinger (2) 1985, 1991
  - Men's Board-a-Match Teams (2) 1981, 1984
  - Blue Ribbon Pairs (2) 1983, 1988
  - Life Master Pairs (1) 1988
  - Life Master Men's Pairs (1) 1983
  - Men's Pairs (1) 1983
- Other notable wins:
  - Pan-American Maccabi Games (1) 1983
  - Cavendish Invitational Teams (1) 1988
  - Cavendish Invitational Pairs (2) 1984, 1989
  - Goldman Pairs (1) 1983

=== Runners-up ===
- North American Bridge Championships (10)
  - Vanderbilt (2) 1982, 1990
  - Spingold (1) 1983
  - Grand National Teams (2) 1979, 1991
  - Open Board-a-Match Teams (1) 1990
  - Master Mixed Teams (2) 1989, 1991
  - Life Master Men's Pairs (1) 1986
  - Grand National Pairs (1) 1984
- United States Bridge Championships (1)
  - Open Team Trials (1) 1985
- Other notable 2nd places:
  - Cavendish Invitational Teams (1) 1986
