= 2/1 =

2/1 may refer to:

- February 1 (month-day date notation)
- January 2 (day-month date notation)
- 2nd Battalion, 1st Marines
- 2/1 game forcing, bidding system in Bridge
