= Opening lead =

First card played in the playing phase of a contract bridge deal

The opening lead is the first card played in the playing phase of a contract bridge deal. The defender sitting to the left (LHO) of the declarer is the one who makes the opening lead. Since it is the only card played while dummy's cards are still concealed, it can be critical for the outcome of the deal. Making the best opening lead is a combination of selecting the best suit and then the best card within that suit.

== Selecting the suit ==
Considerations are:

- Good suits to lead may be:
  - a suit partner has bid
  - a suit not bid by declarer's side
  - a suit bid by declarer's partner
- Against a suit contract:
  - a short suit lead may be good, but only when it is likely that partner will be able to obtain the lead and return the suit.
  - but leading a suit containing an ace may be bad
- Against NT contracts
  - leading a long suit may be good
  - leading a suit in which partner could have length may be good
- Choosing an aggressive or safe lead is important:
  - defeating some contracts calls for aggressive leads, while others call for safe leads. For example, take a look at the following deal:

♠♤	9 3 2
♥	J 8 7
♦	A Q J 6 5
♣♧	7 3
N S
♠♤	A 6
♥	K Q 10 5 3
♦	8 3 2
♣♧	A 9 8 5

North and South have reached a contract of 4♥, which has some possibilities. At first glance the declarer seems to be losing a spade, a heart, maybe a diamond if the finesse fails and a club or maybe more. However, if the opening lead is the ♥2 (a safe lead) Declarer will find it much easier to make the contract because he will have time to set up the diamond suit. The ♠4 lead (an aggressive lead) will make his job more difficult.

  - the best of both worlds is a lead that is both aggressive and safe, for example leading a suit headed by an honour sequence will give little away and may well set up tricks for the defence

== Selecting the card ==
Partnerships may choose their own method of "carding". The following is considered fairly standard (mainly Klinger 1994):

- Leading a singleton against a suit contract is recommended only when defender has a trump stop
- Other short suit (two or three cards) leads:
  - from a doubleton lead the higher card, thus from 93 lead the 9
  - from a three card suit
    - if headed by an honour (not a sequence) lead the lowest, thus from Q92 lead the 2
    - if all cards are low, there are three schools of thought:
      - TON "top of nothing" – lead the top card. It has the advantage of denying an honour, but is ambiguous with a lead from doubleton,
      - MUD "middle-up-down" – lead the middle card, and play the highest card next.
      - the lowest card (least popular)
    - if headed by a sequence (even two cards) lead the highest. From QJ2 lead the Q
- long suit (four cards or more) leads:
  - from a sequence of honours lead the highest, thus from KQJx lead the K
  - from a suit containing an internal sequence lead the top of that sequence, thus from KJ109 lead the J
  - from a suit headed by an honour, defender generally leads the fourth best card, allowing partner to employ the Rule of 11
  - from an honourless suit, the highest or second-highest is normally led, especially against suit contracts; some partnerships lead fourth best against notrump though.
- From hands containing both A and K
  - from AKx or AKxx etc. lead the A
  - from AK doubleton lead the K
- Against a suit contract, many partnerships reserve a special meaning for the lead of a 10 .. it promises a touching card J or 9 and a non-touching higher honour e.g. K J10, K 109, Q 109.

== Difficulties ==
Ambiguities can arise from this standard method, thus:

- A defender would lead the 2 from K532 and from K32 ... does he have a four-card suit or not?
- Similarly a defender may lead the 2 from 9432 and from KJ92 ... does he have an honour or not?
- A defender would lead A from AK2 or from A32 ... does he have the K or not?
- A defender would lead the K from AK doubleton and from KQx ... does he have the A or the Q?

To overcome these problems various conventions have been devised:

- Rusinow leads - overcomes the ambiguity of a K lead:

	543	
AK6	W N↑ S↓ E	JT2
	?	

When West leads the ♠K East may be confused as to the nature of his holding. If he is leading from ♠KQ East will want to encourage, but if leading from ♠AK East will want to discourage. Rusinow leads recommend leading the second of touching honours and the above confusion is largely eliminated. Rusinow leads are now considered a standard part of the Roman Club system.

- Journalist leads - overcomes the ambiguity of a J lead.

The leader might have J1094 or KJ104. The convention proposes that the opening lead be the Jack from the first sequence and the 10 from the second in order to better inform his partner about the nature of his holding.

== See also ==
- Journalist leads
- Rule of 10-12
- Rule of 11
- Rusinow leads
