= Negative free bid =

Contract bridge convention

Negative free bid is a contract bridge treatment whereby a free bid by responder over an opponent's overcall shows a long suit in a weak hand and is not forcing. This is in contrast with standard treatment, where a free bid can show unlimited values and is unconditionally forcing. The treatment is a relatively recent invention, and has become quite popular, especially in expert circles.

Negative free bids resolve relatively frequent situations where the responder holds a long suit with which he would like to compete for a partscore, but is deprived from bidding it by opponent's overcall.

== Example ==
West	North	East	South
	1♦	1♠	?

For example, if South holds: ♠ 86 ♥ KJ10852 ♦ K6 ♣ 532, partner opens 1♦ and East overcalls 1♠, he couldn't bid 2♥ in standard methods, as it would show 10+ high-card points, and a negative double would be too off-shape. With NFB treatment in effect though, he can bid 2♥ which the partner may pass (unless she has extra values and support, or an excellent suit of her own without tolerance for hearts).

However, as a corollary, negative free bids affect the scope of negative double; if the hand is suitable for "standard" forcing free bid (10-11+ points), a negative double has to be made first and the suit bid only in the next round. Thus, the negative double can be made with the following types of hand:

- A weakish hand with unbid suits (unbid major)
- A stronger hand with unbid suits
- A strong (opening bid or more) one-suited hand.

This can sometimes allow the opponents to preempt effectively.

West	North	East	South
1♦	1♥	Dbl	4♥
?			

For example, West, holding: ♠ KJ103 ♥ J8 ♦ AKQ104 ♣ J2, after this auction is in an awkward situation — he doesn't know whether partner has spades or not; whether South was bidding to make or to sacrifice — is it correct to double, bid 4♠ or pass?

== See also ==
- Negative double
- Support double
- Takeout double
