= Ekren convention =

In the game of bridge, Ekren refers to a preemptive opening of 2♦ defined as 4-4, 4-5, 5-4 or 5-5 in the majors and 3–10 high card points. This conventional preempt was designed by Bjørn Olav Ekren from Norway and is an example of the modern style of highly aggressive preemptive bidding.

== Responses ==
Responses to a 2♦ Ekren opening:

Pass = to play (can be a tactical manoeuvre in the absence of a major suit fit and does not guarantee long diamonds)
2♥/♠ = to play
2NT = relay (invitational or stronger)
3♣ = natural, not forcing
3♦ = invitational with 3-3 in the majors
3♥/♠ = preemptive, to play
4♥/♠ = to play

In responding to the 2NT relay the opener indicates whether he holds a minimum or a maximum (because of their playing strength 5-5s are generally considered maximum), and – in case of a maximum – the distribution in the majors:

3♣ = any minimum (responder's 3♥/♠ rebid now indicates an invite)
3♦ = 5-5 min or max (creates game force)
3♥ = 4-5 max (creates game force)
3♠ = 5-4 max (creates game force)
3NT = 4-4 max (creates game force)

== Modifications ==
Variants of Ekren include the use of the 2♥ opening to indicate a weak hand with at least a 4-4 in the majors. This treatment has the advantage that the left hand opponent of the opener can hardly gamble on the fact that (s)he will get a second chance to bid.

Another variant that is popular in the Netherlands (where it is referred to as Tilburg Two) and Belgium is to accommodate the Ekren hands as a weak variant in the strong 2♣ opening. This leaves untouched the 2♦/♥/♠ openings which are commonly utilised in the Low Countries as Multi 2 diamonds and Muiderberg (also known as Tartan or 'Jón og Símon') openings. Also, a 2♦ relay is now available to responder that can be used to ask for the longest (or better) of the two major suits.
