= Fragment bid =

Bidding convention in contract bridge

Developed by Monroe Ingberman, a fragment bid is a bidding convention used in the card game contract bridge. It is an unusual jump rebid, usually a double jump, by either the opener or the responder which shows a fit with partner's suit and shortage, either a singleton or void, in the fourth suit.

Although analogous to splinter bids, fragment bids differ in that they require the naming of a suit held rather than the short suit itself. Partnership agreement is required on the details of either splinter or fragment bids and their continuations.

== Examples ==
=== Fragment bid by opener ===
North	South
1♠	2♦
4♥	

The 4♥ rebid by opener is a fragment bid; it is double jump showing two or three cards in the fragment suit (hearts), a singleton or void in clubs and support for partner's diamond suit.

=== Fragment bids by responder ===
North	South
1♣	1♥
1♠	4♣

The 4♣ bid is a fragment bid showing support for spades and shortness in the unbid suit, diamonds.

North	South
1♣	1♥
1♠	4♦

When three suits have been bid naturally, a double jump in the fourth suit is a fragment bid. The 4♦ bid shows support for partner's last bid suit (spades) and a singleton in his first suit (clubs).

North	South
1♣	1♥
1♠	4♦
4♠	5♣

If the fragment bidder rebids the suit in which he has promised shortness, he shows a void; in this case in clubs.

== See also ==
- Splinter bid
