= Rule of 11 =

Contract bridge guideline about a lead

In contract bridge, the Rule of 11 is applied when the opening lead is the fourth best from the defender's suit. By subtracting the rank of the card led from 11, the partner of the opening leader can determine how many cards higher than the card led are held by declarer, dummy and himself; by deduction of those in dummy and in his own hand, he can determine the number in declarer's hand.

== Logic ==
The rule works because the opening leader is known to have exactly three cards higher than that led and the number of cards lower in rank to that card is also known. The following reasoning applies when the lead is known to be or is suspected to be the lead of opener's fourth best card in the suit:

- the total number of cards greater than the card led is self-evident based upon the rank of the card led. If a 2-spot card is led, there are 12 higher cards because there are only 13 cards in a suit and the 2 is the lowest; if a 3-spot is led, there are 11; if a 4, there are 10 and so on. In general, the total number of cards higher in rank than the card led is (14-x) where x represents the spot rank of the card led.
- from the total number higher than the card led (14-x), we deduct the number held by leader (3). This is expressed as (14-x) - (3) or (11-x), stated as 11 minus the spot card led.

Thus, 11-x represents the number of cards higher than the card led held collectively by dummy, declarer and partner of the opening leader. When dummy is tabled after the opening lead is made, partner of the opening leader can count the number of cards higher than the card led that are in dummy and in his own hand and, by deduction of this total from 11-x, can determine the number of higher cards declarer holds.

== Example ==
When West leads the ♠7 in the hand below, East applies the Rule of 11. This shows that there are four cards higher than the ♠7 that dummy, declarer and East hold. Since East can see the ♠Q and ♠8 in dummy and the ♠A and ♠10 in his own hand, declarer can have no cards higher than the ♠7. Knowing this, if the dummy covers with the ♠8, East knows he can win the trick cheaply with the ♠10.

	♠ Q 8 2	
♠ K J 9 7 3	W N↑ S↓ E	♠ A 10 5
	♠ 6 4	

However, the declarer can apply the Rule of 11, too. When West leads the ♠7 in the deal below, South can see the four higher cards in his hand and on the board. Accordingly, he knows that the play of the ♠8 from the board will win the trick cheaply.

	♠ Q 8 2	
♠ K J 9 7 3	W N↑ S↓ E	♠ 6 4
	♠ A 10 5	

Since the Rule of 11 may help declarer as well as the defenders, some prefer leads other than the fourth-best. For example, Journalist Leads generally call for the lead of the third or fifth best.

== See also ==
- Bridge maxims
- Opening lead
- Rule of 10-12
