= Principle of fast arrival =

Contract bridge bidding treatment

In the game of contract bridge, the principle of fast arrival (also known as the principle of slow arrival) is a bidding treatment widely used in game forcing auctions whereby:

- Bidding game directly, usually via a jump bid, shows a minimum hand for one's previous bidding, and is limiting, and
- Conversely, making a forcing bid, such as a change of suit below game level, shows extra strength or potential beyond the minimum.

Historically, constructive bidding was based on the idea that the stronger a responding hand, the higher a bid, or jump, was made. In modern bidding styles, a slower progression of bids was deemed a more scientific method of investigating for the best contract. The principle of fast arrival was a logical product of this newer style and inverted previous meanings on the premise that since jumps to game leave less room for slam investigation, they imply an absence of slam values and therefore discourage more bidding. In addition, on weaker (or limited) hands fast arrival has a pre-emptive effect on the opposition and minimizes the information they might otherwise exchange.

Stated conversely as the principle of slow arrival, the approach leaves more bidding space for stronger hands to explore for slam or choose the optimum game contract.

== See also ==
- Bridge maxims
- Principle of restricted choice
- Useful space principle
