= Overcall =

Bid made after an opening bid has been made by an opponent

In contract bridge, an overcall is a bid made after an opening bid has been made by an opponent; the term refers only to the first such bid. A direct overcall is such a bid made by the player seated immediately to the left of the opener, i.e. next in the bidding rotation; an overcall in the 'last seat', i.e. by the player to the right of opener, which is made after two intervening passes, is referred to as a balancing or protective overcall.

== Objectives ==
The overcaller has one or more of the following objectives:

- To secure the contract
- To suggest a good lead from partner
- To induce the opponents to a higher-level contract
- To find an effective sacrifice
- To hinder the opponents in their bidding

== Suit overcalls ==
In most bidding systems, an overcall in an unbid suit is natural, denoting length and strength in the suit bid. The common requirements include:

- A good five-card or any longer suit; the features that qualify a suit as 'good' are subject to partnership agreement.
- 8-16+ high-card points (HCP) for an overcall at the one-level.
- 10-16+ HCP for an overcall at the two-level.
- A higher level overcall (e.g., after an opponent's preempt) requires at least opening-bid strength.

The rule of thumb is that the weaker a hand is in high card points, the better the bid suit should be (i.e., longer or with stronger honors).

Examples

According to modern bridge theory, the following hands warrant a 1♥ overcall over an opposing 1♣ or 1♦ opening:

♠ 632 ♥ AKJ96 ♦ 8752 ♣ 4
♠ A32 ♥ AKJ96 ♦ 752 ♣ 104
♠ A3 ♥ AK986 ♦ KQ5 ♣ 742

Stronger hands such as ♠ A3 ♥ AK986 ♦ KQ5 ♣ Q42 are considered too strong for an overcall, and should be bid via a takeout double followed by the most economical rebid in hearts.

== Notrump overcalls ==
Notrump overcalls at the one-level normally indicate 15-18 HCP in a balanced hand, with at least one stopper in opponent's suit. Usually, Stayman is on but transfers are off.

Example

The hand ♠ KJ63 ♥ AQ2 ♦ A84 ♣ Q93 is suitable for a 1NT overcall over any opening bid, as well as a 2NT overcall over an opponent's weak two bid.

== Jump overcalls ==
Jump overcalls are made by skipping one level of bidding, e.g. 1♦ – (2♠).

Jump overcalls are classified according to strength of hand as weak, intermediate, and strong. In the United States weak jump overcalls are currently considered normal, while intermediate and strong overcalls are not expected by the opponents and those treatments of the bid by partnership agreement require that the opponents be alerted to the meaning of the bid.

The Four Aces team (David Burnstine and others) introduced the weak, "preemptive jump overcall" in the U.S. late in 1933, but the strong treatment was standard for decades, following the popular authorities Ely Culbertson and Charles Goren whose bidding systems incorporated the strong. Goren adopted the weak treatment in May 1955, two months before the ACBL introduced its first convention card, with "Pre-emptive single jump overcalls and responses" one of ten pre-printed items to be marked if applicable.

According to The Official Encyclopedia of Bridge, published by ACBL, the definitions of the three bids are as follows:

1. Weak. A hand roughly equivalent to a weak two bid opening, normally in the 6-10 point range, below the strength for a normal overcall. The strength requirement declines as vulnerability becomes more favorable.
2. Intermediate. A hand about equivalent to a minimum opening. Frequently used in balancing seat even by those who use weak jump overcalls in other situations.
3. Strong. A hand worth an opening bid followed by a jump. Such a bid is sometimes used over weak two-bids, even by those who use weak jump overcalls in other situations.

Thus, a weak jump overcall of 2♠ would be made with ♠ KQJ653 ♥ J53 ♦ 432 ♣ 3, while an intermediate jump overcall of 2♠ would be closer to or including opening bid values, like ♠ QJT532 ♥ AK3 ♦ J43 ♣ 3 or ♠ AKJ432 ♥ 3 ♦ 43 ♣ K432.

Strong jump overcalls are not commonly used in today's game except over a weak preemptive bid by an opponent. After 2♦(weak), a jump overcall of 3♠ would reflect a hand such as ♠ AKQ543 ♥ AQ3 ♦ K94 ♣ 5.

== Other overcalls ==
Some partnerships utilise more exotic overcalls. An example are the canapé overcalls used by the Italian top pair Norberto Bocchi and Giorgio Duboin. In canapé overcalls the suit bid typically contains a three card, whilst the hand contains a five card in another suit.

Conventional overcalls, such as Michaels cuebid, Unusual notrump and Raptor, denote specific hand types.

== Responses to overcalls ==
The partner of the overcaller is called the Advancer. In response to partner's overcall, Advancer typically bids as follows: (Players may agree to slightly different methods)

- pass: weak hand (no fit guaranteed)
- Single raise: three or more trumps, 7-10 total points, including distribution
- cue bid: Three or more trumps, invitational or better. Game or slam may be bid later from this starting point. 11+ total points. May also be a notrump response with 16+ HCP, clarified on the next round of bidding.
- Jump raise: four or more trumps, weak. The distinction between a weak jump raise and a single raise may be based on the constructive values contained in the hand, such as HCP. The fewer the values and the greater the number of trumps, the more likely the jump raise will interfere with the opponents' bidding while warning partner of lack of HCP assets. Preemptive raises are based on four or more trumps and likely shortness in a side suit.
- New suit: at least five cards. Depending on agreements, either forcing one round or simply constructive. Typically 10 or more HCP.
- Jump shift: A good six card suit and opening bid values or better. Forcing for one round.
- 1NT: 8-11 HCP, no fit, stopper(s) in opener's suit.
- 2NT: 12-15 HCP, no fit, stopper(s) in opponent's suit.

== See also ==
- Takeout double
- Leaping Michaels
- Unusual notrump
- Ghestem
- Raptor
- List of defenses to 1NT
