= Bergen raises =

Bridge convention

In contract bridge, Bergen raises are conventional treatments of responses to a major suit opening in a five-card major system. Developed by Marty Bergen and first published in April 1982, Bergen raises are based on the Law of total tricks, a hand evaluation concept which states that with a combined nine trumps in the partnership one should compete to at least the three-level regardless of combined high card strength.

Bergen recommended that instead of the more rare occurrence in the use of the 3♣ and 3♦ response as a jump shift to show a strong hand, these bids should be redeployed to provide more precise information about the length and strength of support held by responder for partner's five-card major suit opening when responder has four-card support.

Bergen raises are used in response to a 1♥ or 1♠ opening bid to show hands of specific length in trump support and strength as follows:

- 1NT followed by 3♥/3♠ on next round – invitational to game (typically 11-12 high card points) with three-card support
- 2♥/2♠ – weak (7-10 high card points) with three-card support
- 3♣ – weak (typically 7-10 high card points) with four-card support
- 3♦ – a limit raise (typically 11-12 high card points) with four-card support; invitational to game
- 3♥/3♠ – very weak (preemptive, typically less than 7 high card points) and four-card support
- 4♥/4♠ – very weak (preemptive, typically less than 7 high card points) and five-card support

Over 3♣, Opener may sign off in trumps, but a bid of 3♦ asks partner to bid three of the major with a weaker hand, i.e. 7-8 points, or bid four with a stronger hand, i.e. 9-10 points.

Many partnerships which employ Bergen raises also use Jacoby 2NT and splinter bids in response to major suit openings for game-forcing hands with trump support. A direct raise to game is then preemptive on a very shapely hand (often with five card trump support).

Modifications to Bergen responses do exist. One such method (usually called Reverse Bergen) is to reverse the meanings of the two minor suit responses at the three level, thereby creating a system of responses that denote progressively weaker hands on subsequent bids.

== Bergen Raises over One-of-a-Major Doubled (BROMAD) ==
Some partnerships play an extension of Bergen Raises after opener's bid has been doubled. This is called "BROMAD". There are several schemes, including one which keeps 3♣ and 3♦ (as above) and adds 2♣ and 2♦ with similar meanings, but with only three-card trump support. Others simply have one raise at each level for 7-10 HCP (with three or four trumps), and use Jordan 2NT with four trumps and 11+ HCP. Bergen himself indicates that different partnerships have different preferences for which suit to use. In all cases, the direct raise shows a 'pre-emptive' three-card raise, limited to 6 HCP.
