= Fourth suit forcing =

Contract bridge convention that allows responder to create a forcing auction

Fourth suit forcing (also referred to as fourth suit artificial; abbreviated as FSF or 4SF) is a contract bridge convention that allows responder to create, at his second turn to bid, a forcing auction. A bid by responder in the fourth suit, the only remaining unbid suit, is artificial indicating that responder has no appropriate alternate bid, remains interested in the potential for a game contract and asks opener to bid again to show additional features.

Opener responds to the fourth suit forcing by (in prioritised order):

1. Raising responder's first bid suit with 3-card support,
2. Bidding notrump with values in the fourth suit,
3. Raising the fourth suit with four cards in that suit,
4. Making the most natural rebid possible, lacking any of the above.

Fourth suit forcing is minimally forcing for one round and usually forcing to game – partnership agreement is required. Whether or not the convention is applicable if the fourth-suit bidder is a passed hand is also a matter of partnership agreement; there is no consensus amongst experts on the options as to its use being non-forcing, forcing, or forcing only after a reverse.

It requires an invitational hand with at least 10 points, or 12–13 upwards if it is game-forcing and opener has not shown any extra strength.

The convention was introduced by the British bridge author Norman Squire as part of the Baron System developed in the 1940's and is adopted by the majority of partnerships playing at competitive levels. Useful with strong game-going hands where responder has no natural forcing rebid, it is a type of game try bid.

Corollary to fourth suit forcing

One of the negative inferences of fourth suit forcing is that all other simple jumps by responder at his second turn are invitational and not game forcing. In the unopposed sequence 1♣ – 1♥; 1♠ a jump by responder to 2NT, 3♣, 3♥ or 3♠ are all invitational and not forcing. They suggest 10–12 HCP. Conversely, going through 2♦, the fourth suit, lets you make any of those calls at your next turn and have the call be forcing.

Fourth suit by a passed hand

Entirely different considerations apply when the fourth suit bidder is a passed hand. Since the bidder is limited in strength through failure to open, he cannot force his partner to keep bidding, but the fact that opener has rebid at all says that opener is either very shapely or has more than minimum values for an opening bid.

Opener may pass a bid of the fourth suit. If opener continues with 2NT, which will show values, responder is expected to raise to 3NT with nothing more, by way of shape, to show. Opener will generally pass a rebid in responder's second suit, knowing the hand opposite is very shapely and weak. With ill-fitting hands, lacking game going values, a bid in the fourth suit will often allow the partnership to subside in a playable contract in a reasonable fit, at the two-level. See example 3.

== Example 1 ==
North	South
1♦	1♠
2♣	?

South holds ♠ A Q 8 6 2 ♥ 8 4 3 ♦ Q 7 ♣ A 6 5 in the auction at left.

After 2♣ by North, South sees there is likelihood for game given that the partnership has bid three suits bid and holds around 24–26 high card points. However, he does not have a good natural bid available; each would give partner the impression of stronger support than he has, and might lead to a poor choice of contract.

- He has shown his spade suit fully. To rebid spades would imply a longer or stronger suit than he has; they are not good enough for a 3♠ rebid.
- He cannot bid in support of either minor suit because his holding in both is inadequate.
- He cannot bid notrumps because it implies a heart stopper, which he lacks and his partner is quite likely to lack as well, having shown two suits so far. If he bids notrumps and ends up in 3NT, a heart lead will be an obvious strategy and loss of four or five heart tricks is possible.

South instead bids the fourth suit (fourth suit forcing), i.e. 2♥, to indicate that he believes they have values for game, that he lacks a stopper in hearts needed for notrumps and that he has no viable bid in any of the other suits. Depending on partnership agreement, this 2♥ bid may be either forcing for one round, or forcing to game.

== Example 2 ==
North	South
1♣	1♥
1♠	2♦
2♥	2♠

The fourth suit forcing approach in conjunction with the principle of fast arrival allows the partnership to create a game-forcing auction at low level that leaves ample room to explore for slam.

Here, the 2♠ bid denotes a four card spade support and a hand too strong for a fast-arrival bid of 4♠. This assumes the partnership are playing all FSF bids, at 2 or 3 level, as forcing to game. If playing that a 2 level FSF bid is forcing for one round only, responder will need to jump to 3♠ on the third round to create the game force.

== Example 3 ==
The following is an example of a fourth-suit bid by a passed hand being non-forcing; this partnership agreement allows opener to make a preference bid by either passing or returning to partner's first suit.

♠♤	KQ754	W E	♠♤	AJ
♥	65	W E	♥	AK743
♦	KQ75	W E	♦	42
♣♧	82	W E	♣♧	QJ93

West	North	East	South
Pass	Pass	1♥	Pass
1♠	Pass	2♣^{1}	Pass
2♦^{2}	Pass	2♠^{3}	Pass
Pass^{4}	Pass		

^{1} Just strong enough to justify another bid over West's passed hand response.
^{2} Natural, not forcing, more flexible than 2NT.
^{3} With three-card support East would give strong, jump preference.
^{4} No primary fit has been uncovered, to bid on would jeopardise a plus score.

The side has done well to avoid a very poor 25 point 3NT contract.
