= Journalist leads =

Opening lead convention in the game of contract bridge

Journalist leads are an opening lead convention in the game of contract bridge. The method is designed to solve some problems with traditional agreements regarding opening leads. It bears some resemblance to Rusinow leads but differences exist. Journalist leads were advocated and publicized in 1964–1965 by The Bridge Journal and were written under the name Journalist, which meant that they were a compilation of the opinions of the entire editorial staff of the magazine. (The Bridge Journal ceased publication in 1968 when its editor, Jeff Rubens, joined the editorial staff of The Bridge World.)

Not only do Journalist leads attempt to show what the opening leader has, but may also request the partner of opening leader to take specific actions, such as unblocking.

There are entirely different leads against notrump and suit contracts.

Against notrump contracts:

- A = demands unblock or count
- K = normal from AK or KQ
- Q = from QJ, KQ10, AQ10, or AQJ; demands J
- J = from J10; denies higher honor
- 10 = from Q109, K109, A109, KJ10 or AJ10
- 9 = from 109; denies higher honor
- relatively high spot = discourages continuation of suit
- relatively low spot = encourages continuation of suit

The proposed advantage of Journalist leads is shown in this deal:

	64	
KJ1092	W N↑ S↓ E	A53
	Q87	

When West leads the Jack his partner may win the Ace and switch to another suit. When the 10 is led East will know to return the suit.

== See also ==
- Rule of 10-12
- Rusinow leads
