= Rule of 10-12 =

Contract bridge lead

In contract bridge, the Rule of 10-12 is applied when the opening lead is the third or the fifth best from the defender's suit. By subtracting the rank of the card led from 10 or 12 respectively, a defender can determine how many cards are higher than the card partner has led. Ten is used if the lead is fifth best and 12 is used if the lead is the third best. The Rule of 11 applies when the lead is the 4th best.

When following the Rule of 10-12, the lead is the third card from a three or four-card suit and the fifth card from a five-card or longer suit. Leading the third best is also applied to interior sequences (K J 10 x x) which is less ambiguous than the top of interior sequence. The third best lead from an interior sequence is called a coded 9 & 10 lead.

Sometimes opening leader may choose to lead the fourth best card from a four-card suit against a notrump contract if the third card is a spot card. The spot-card lead may give declarer a trick that he can't get if the fourth best is led.

	Q 6 5 4	
K 9 7 3	W N↑ S↓ E	A 10 2
	J 8	

If the opening lead is the 7, the suit will be blocked and defense is unable to set up the 3rd winner in the suit.

== Variation ==
Possible variation that helps giving count from 5+ cards suit is leading the third best from even number of cards and the lowest from odd number.

== See also ==
- Rule of 11
- Journalist Leads
