= Negative double =

Type of bid within contract bridge

The negative double is a form of takeout double in bridge. It is made by the responder after their right-hand opponent overcalls on the first round of bidding, and is used to show shortness in overcall's suit, support for the unbid suits with emphasis on majors, as well as some values. It is treated as forcing, but not unconditionally so. In practice, the negative double is sometimes used as a sort of catch-all, made when no other call properly describes responder's hand. Therefore, a partnership might even treat the negative double as a wide-ranging call that merely shows some values.

== Usage ==
Using the modern negative double convention, it is understood that a double over an initial overcall is conventional, and not for penalties (but see Playing for penalties). For example, using this convention, the following doubles would be regarded as negative, not for penalty:

- 1♣ – (1♦) – Dbl
- 1m – (1M) – Dbl
- 1♥ – (1♠) – Dbl
- 1M – (2m) – Dbl

In understandings regarding negative doubles, the emphasis is on major suit lengths. This is largely due to the special value that tournament play, especially the pairs game, places on major suits. Since the mid-1980s, the negative double has been used mainly to stand in for a bid in an unbid major suit.

Most partnerships using the negative double agree that it applies only through a particular level of overcall. For example, they may agree that the double of an overcall through 3♠ is negative, and that beyond 3♠ a double is for penalties.

At rubber bridge many players are reluctant to give up the penalty double of an overcall, and so do not use the double as conventional.

== History of terms used for this bid ==
The term negative double was initially employed to distinguish it from the penalty, or business, or positive double, and signified a double over an opponent's opening bid whose meaning was a request for partner to bid his best suit. Around 1930, the term informatory double replaced negative double, and that term later gave way to takeout double as it is used at present; the original term negative double fell into disuse.

In 1957, Alvin Roth in his partnership with Tobias Stone appropriated the abandoned term negative double to denote a conventional double by responder over an overcall and gave it its current meaning. The bid was also briefly known as Sputnik, because it was as new as the satellite of that name that the Soviet Union had recently launched. The term is still used sometimes in Europe.

== Forcing ==
The negative double is generally forcing, but opener might pass to convert the double to a penalty double. There is a special agreement called negative free bids, under which (after the overcall) the bid of a new suit by responder is not forcing. However, most negative doublers play that a new suit response (or free bid), whether at the one level or higher, is forcing.

The negative double loses even more definition when it can be made with a very broad range of strength, from roughly six HCP up to game forcing values. In a pinch, players use it to "get by this round of bidding."

== Playing for penalties ==
The negative double does not cause the partnership to completely lose the ability to penalize an overcall. There are two ways that the overcall can be doubled for penalties. For example:

- 1♦ – (1♥) – Dbl – (Pass); Pass

Responder makes a negative double, and opener passes for penalties. This position is analogous to one in which a player makes a takeout double and his partner passes the double, converting it to a penalty double.

- 1♦ – (1♥) – Pass – (Pass); Dbl – (Pass) – Pass

Responder passes the overcall, opener makes a re-opening double, and responder passes that double for penalties. This can be dangerous, because opener often doesn't know whether responder is simply too weak to make any call, or is hoping that opener can re-open with a double.

These situations are rare, though, and the more so because some five-card major partnerships play negative doubles over minor suit openings only. The rationale is that responder knows much more about opener's distribution after a major suit opening than after a minor suit opening, and can better judge whether to play in opener's major suit, to play for penalties by doubling, or to show a suit of his own.

== Support for unbid suits ==
Partnerships have different understandings about the length in unbid suits that is shown by a negative double, and the understandings differ according both to which suits remain unbid and to the current level of the bidding. Nevertheless, the following are popular understandings:

- After 1♣ – (1♦), a negative double is often understood to show at least four cards in both hearts and spades. The degree of support for this agreement has grown over the years. A poll of experts taken in 1983 showed that about half concurred that doubler should have at least four hearts and at least four spades; a similar poll taken in 2000 showed 80% in concurrence. An alternative would be the meaning of exactly four hearts, without providing information on spades. This version of negative double is called Collante or Sticky.
- After 1m – (1♥), a popular agreement is that a negative double shows exactly four spades. Responder would bid 1♠ with five or more. However, in 2000, this approach was favored by fewer than two thirds of polled experts.
- After 1m – (1♠), in contrast to the prior sequence, most experts prefer the negative double here to show at least four hearts – not exactly four hearts. Partnerships playing Rodrigue use the raise to 2m (opener's minor) to show a 5-card ♥ too weak for a natural 2♥ bid in competition. These partnerships can play the negative double to show exactly four hearts after a 1♠ overcall.
- After 1M – (2m), most play that a negative double shows at least four cards in the other major.
- After 1♦ – (2♣), few play that double shows at least four cards in each major, but most play that doubler shows at least one major at least four cards long.
- After 1♥ - (1♠) or 1♠ - (2♥), the negative double shows at least 4 cards in each minor because there are no unbid major suits.

== See also ==
- Negative free bid
- Support double
- Takeout double
