= Michaels cuebid =

Conventional bid in contract bridge

The Michaels cuebid is a conventional bid used in the card game contract bridge. First devised by Michael Michaels of Miami Beach, FL, it is an overcaller's cuebid in opponent's opening suit and is normally used to show a two-suited hand with at least five cards in each suit and eight or more points.

After the opponents have opened at the one-level, the overcaller bids the same suit at the two-level; the two normal cases are:

1. Over an opponent's minor opening, a cuebid shows both majors. For example, 1♣ – 2♣ shows hearts and spades.
2. Over an opponent's major opening, a cuebid shows the other major and a minor suit. For example, 1♠ – 2♠ shows hearts and either clubs or diamonds. Partner can make a 2NT relay bid to request partner to bid his minor suit, or a 3♣ pass-or-correct bid.

Partnerships who have incorporated Michaels cuebids amongst their bidding system agreements usually also play the unusual notrump convention.

== Requirements ==
Point count requirements vary and are a matter of partnership agreement. It is commonly agreed that a Michaels cuebid is constructive and should be made on hands that hold the prospect of winning the auction; hand emphasis is on trick-taking capability suggesting that the long suits contain most of the HCP and have good texture, particularly at unfavourable vulnerability.

With less than eight points, Michaels is not recommended - the chances of winning the auction are small and it gives the opponents too much information. Bidders expecting to make or sacrifice can use basic Michaels at all point ranges with eight or more. In a common variant, known as Mini-Maxi Michaels, candidate hands are classed into three ranges and Michaels is applied more selectively:

- Weak - 8 to 12 points: use Michaels
- Intermediate - 13 to 15 points: do not use Michaels, bid the higher suit followed by the lower
- Strong - 16 or more points: use Michaels

== Responses to Michaels ==
Initially, partner should assume a weak hand by the Michaels bidder; with a strong hand, the Michaels bidder will follow with a second non-forced call. Responses to the Michaels cuebid include:

- A preference bid
- A jump preference bid (usually preemptive)
- A cuebid of opener's suit, which is a game or slam try
- A new suit, non-forcing
- 2NT. When the cuebid is in a major suit, asks partner to name his minor suit. (3♣, pass or correct, may also be used for this, showing a lower strength range than 2NT).
- 3NT is to play
- 4♣ serves the same purpose as 2NT in competitive auctions when 2NT is no longer available. 4NT serves the same purpose as 2NT when 2NT and 4♣ are not available.

== Rebids by the Michaels bidder ==
- With 12 or fewer, pass or raise. Raise is not invitational, it shows 6/5 or better and is optional and preemptive
- With 16 or more, bid a new suit inviting game

== Modifications ==
Several modifications and extensions exist, such as the Modified Michaels cuebid, Leaping Michaels and Super Michaels.

In the Netherlands, a particular modification is growing in popularity: over opponent's opening, a cuebid shows a major and a minor unbid suit. The 2NT overcall is then used to show both majors (after a minor suit opening) or both minors (after a major suit opening). This approach allows all three two suiters in the three unbid suits to be indicated. Compared to standard Michaels, the disadvantage is that after an opposing minor suit opening, one cannot introduce a two suiter in the majors at the two-level. Also, the cuebid invariably leaves one of both suits unspecified.

A variant often referred to as upper cuebid is popular in Germany. In this treatment a cuebid shows the highest unbid suit and another unspecified suit. Together with the unusual notrump convention to indicate the lowest of the two unbid suits, this approach allows all two suiters in the three unbid suits to be indicated. Compared to standard Michaels, the disadvantage is that after an opposing minor suit opening, one cannot describe a two suiter in the majors in one bid.

Also, Michaels cuebid variants exist that remove any ambiguity on what is the second suit. An example is the hi-hi cuebid that over opponent's opening invariably shows the highest unbid suits. Together with the unusual notrump convention to indicate the lowest of the two unbid suits, this hi-hi cuebid allows two out of the three possible two suiters in the unbid suits to be specified in one single bid. A drawback of this method is that the hi-hi cuebid does not cater for two-suiters in the highest and lowest unbid suits.

An alternative approach is to use three separate bids to specify each two-suited combination explicitly, as in Ghestem and its variants. This of course requires a third bid to be used for this purpose, typically 3♣.

== Defense ==
The opening side may defend against a Michaels cuebid or any other conventional two-suited overcall with the Unusual vs. Unusual convention. This defense assigns conventional meanings to a double and to cuebids of the suits shown by the two-suited overcall.

== Comparison to Ghestem ==
Ghestem is more precise in terms of uniquely defining the specific suits denoted. Another drawback compared to Ghestem is that following an opposing minor suit opening, the Michaels cuebid used in combination with the unusual notrump convention does not cater for a two-suiter in spades and the other minor. Hands like these can only be indicated by overcalling 1♠ and, if possible, later introducing the minor suit. However, Ghestem has the disadvantage that after a 1 of a minor opening, you cannot choose a major at the two level, as the cuebid to show both majors is 3 ♣. Another two-suited overcall system defining both suits explicitly is CRO (Colour, Rank, Other) which has similar advantages and disadvantages to Ghestem. It is also possible to use combinations of the bids that show all the two-suiters explicitly while allowing both majors to be bid at the two-level, such as RCO and SpoDo (Specific Michaels), giving a small theoretical advantage. However, all methods explicitly showing both suits in all combinations lose a natural bid, usually the 3C overcall which can otherwise be useful as a weak or pre-emptive jump overcall.

== See also ==
- Copenhagen convention
- Cue bid
- Takeout double
