= Law of total tricks =

Contract bridge guideline

In contract bridge, the Law of total tricks (abbreviated here as LoTT) is a guideline used to help determine how high to bid in a competitive auction. It is not really a law (because counterexamples are easy to find) but a method of hand evaluation which describes a relationship that seems to exist somewhat regularly. Written by Jean-René Vernes for French players in the 1950s as a rule of thumb, it was first described in English in 1966 International Bridge Academy Annals. It received more notice from appearing in The Bridge World in June 1969. In 1981 Dick Payne and Joe Amsbury, using their abbreviation TNT (Total Number of Tricks), wrote at length about it for British readers. Later, in the US, Marty Bergen and Larry Cohen popularized the approach, using their preferred abbreviation: 'the LAW' (all capitals).

It was prefigured in S. J. "Skid" Simon's 1945 book Why You Lose at Bridge in his aphorism "When in doubt, bid one more".

== Definition ==
LoTT can be stated as follows:

The total number of tricks available on a deal is equal to the total number of trump cards both sides hold in their respective best suits, where the total number of tricks is defined as the sum of the number of tricks available to each side if they could choose trumps.

As an example, if North-South between them hold nine spades and East-West hold eight clubs, the LoTT says that the total number of tricks available is 17 (9 + 8). Note the LoTT says nothing about how many tricks each side will make; this depends on the split of high card points (HCP) as well as the number of trumps held - if, in the example, the side with eight clubs held all the HCP, they would make all 13 tricks with clubs as trumps - but if the other side could choose spades as trumps, they could well make four tricks (draw trumps and cross ruff) - note 13 + 4 still = 17. When the HCP are fairly evenly split between the two sides, the number of trumps held by each side is a close indicator of the tricks available to each side.

This method works on the assumption that for shapely hands, the combined length of the trump suit is more significant than points or HCP in deciding on the level of the final contract. It is of most value in competitive bidding situations where the HCP are divided roughly equally between the partnerships.

LoTT is said to be most accurate when the HCP are fairly evenly divided between the two sides and the bidding is competitive. Experts apply adjustment factors to improve accuracy.

== TNT (Total Number of Trumps = Total Number of Tricks) ==
Payne and Amsbury's Bridge: TNT and Competitive Bidding (1981) may have been the first major book on the topic. In the introduction, the authors acknowledge Jean-René Vernes as the first writer to investigate TNT (Total Number of Tricks) Theory. Page 19 includes a key table that may not have been printed elsewhere.

== Total trumps principle ==
By combining LoTT with the scoring table, it is argued that the following Total trumps principle is quite often a winning strategy:

Bid to a number of tricks equal to the number of trumps you and your partner hold (and no higher) in a competitive auction.

Thus, with an eight-card fit, a pair is safe to bid to the two level but are unsafe to go to the three level. But, with a nine-card fit, the three level will be safe.

In this context, "safe" does not necessarily mean that the contract will be made. But if not, it means that it is a worthwhile sacrifice against the opponents' contract. For example, if the opponents have bid to two spades, and you have a nine-card heart fit, the "law" says you should bid three hearts. Assuming the opponents have an eight-card spade fit, there are 17 total tricks. If the opponents can take eight tricks, LoTT says you can take nine. If the opponents can take nine tricks, LoTT says you can take only eight. But down one (even doubled, if not vulnerable) is a smaller negative score for you than letting the opponents make three.

Derived from LoTT, this principle assists players in judging the level to which they should bid in a competitive situation. At its simplest, a player should bid to the level of their calculation (from the bidding) of the number of trumps held by their side:

- When the balance of HCP is unfavourable, bidding to this level will act as a useful sacrifice
- When the balance of HCP is favourable, bidding to this level will be an achievable contract
- When the HCP are fairly equally split between the two sides, bidding to this level avoids the danger of a misplaced sacrifice

In certain competitive situations, vulnerability can influence the optimum contract. Thus, with the HCP evenly split and facing a bid at the three level by the opposition, bidding to a level above the number of trumps held can be a useful sacrifice at favourable vulnerability.

== Examples ==
For example, suppose that North-South have an eight-card heart fit and East-West have an eight-card spade fit. The total number of trumps is 16 so the "law" says the total number of tricks is also 16. That is, if North-South can take eight tricks playing in hearts, then East-West can take 16 - 8 = 8 tricks playing in spades; if North-South can take nine tricks in hearts, LoTT says East-West can take only seven tricks in spades.

		♠♤	K Q 8 5 3		
		♥	K 4 3		
		♦	7		
		♣♧	J 10 4 3		
♠♤	10 7	N W E S		♠♤	J 4
♥	A 8 7 6 5	N W E S		♥	10 9 2
♦	J 9 4	N W E S		♦	K Q 10 3
♣♧	K Q 9	N W E S		♣♧	A 8 7 2
		♠♤	A 9 6 2		
		♥	Q J		
		♦	A 8 6 5 2		
		♣♧	6 5		

In the diagram, N-S have 9 spades and E-W 8 hearts combined. N-S can make 4 spades (conceding two clubs and heart ace) while E-W can make only 1 heart on a good defense (which takes a trump from QJ, two spades, diamond ace and two diamond ruffs)—the law holds, as the total tricks available is 10+7=17.

Note, however, how minor card rearrangements affect the law:

1. If the N-S diamonds were divided 4-2 instead of 5-1, with clubs consequently divided 3-3, the available total tricks would be only 8 for N-S + 8 for E-W = 16
2. If, on the other hand, the E-W spades were divided 3-1 instead of 2-2 (with appropriate minor-suit rearrangement), they could make 2♥, while N-S could still make 4♠, giving 18 total tricks.

=== Consequences ===
There are a number of bridge conventions that take advantage of this principle. For example, Bergen raises following an opening bid of one of a major (using a 5-card major system):

- 3 of the major = 4-card support and 0-6 HCP
- 3C = 4-card support and 7-9 points
- 3D = 4-card support and 10-12 HCP

In 2002, Anders Wirgren called the accuracy of the "law" into question, saying it works on only 35-40% of deals. However, Larry Cohen remains convinced it is a useful guideline, especially when adjustments are used properly. Mendelson (1998) finds that it is "accurate to within one trick on the vast majority of hands"
