= Snapdragon double =

Call made during the bidding phase of contract bridge

The snapdragon double (also known as competitive double, fourth-suit double, or impossible double) is a bidding convention in contract bridge. It is a call of double by fourth hand, when three different suits have been bid by the first three players and shows a good holding in the fourth suit (generally six cards, though some partnerships allow five) and tolerance for partner's suit.

The word snapdragon derives from Antirrhinum, which is a genus of plants commonly known as snapdragons from the flowers' fancied resemblance to the face of a dragon that opens and closes its mouth when laterally squeezed, which as a result produces a snap-like sound. The reason for this designation is that the Snapdragon double can only be triggered by the player in the fourth seat after the three previous players have each bid a different suit.

For example, after 1♦ – 1♥ – 1♠, a double would show a hand with primary clubs and heart tolerance. The definition of "tolerance" varies among partnerships, and may include any doubleton, only honor doubleton, or require three-card support. A typical hand for most partnerships would be ♠ Kxx ♥ Kx ♦ xx ♣ QJ10xxx.

In standard bidding, this would be a penalty double, but it is extremely rare to have such a double at the one level, and even there, the opponents may have a better spot. An alternative modern interpretation is for this double to show "cards," and simply ask partner to do something intelligent.

Players choosing to make Snapdragon part of their partnership agreement should agree on:

1. The maximum level to which it can apply. The generally accepted guideline is not to employ it beyond the two-level.
2. The preferred minimum strength and features of the doubling hand at each level.

== See also ==
- Article by Bob Crosby
- Article by Bridge Guys
