= Minor suit =

Diamonds and clubs in contract bridge

In contract bridge the minor suits are diamonds (♦) and clubs (♣). They are given that name because contracts made in those suits score less (20 per contracted trick) than contracts made in the major suits (30 per contracted trick), and they rank lower in bidding. In particular, one can make game with a four-level bid in a major suit, while a five-level bid is required in a minor. Of the two minor suits, diamonds rank higher than clubs.

== Suit combinations ==
Fundamentally, there are three ways to divide four suits into pairs: by color, by rank and by shape resulting in six possible suit combinations.

- Color is used to denote the red suits (hearts and diamonds) and the black suits (spades and clubs).
- Rank is used to indicate the major (spades and hearts) versus minor (diamonds and clubs) suits.
- Shape is used to denote the pointed (diamonds and spades, which visually have a sharp point uppermost) versus rounded (hearts and clubs) suits. This is used only as a mnemonic.

== See also ==
- Standard 52-card deck
- Major suit
- Two suiter
