= Takeout double =

Low-level conventional call

In the card game contract bridge, a takeout double is a low-level conventional call of "Double" over an opponent's bid as a request for partner to bid his best of the unbid suits. The most common takeout double is after an opponent's opening bid of one of a suit where the double shows a hand with opening values, support for all three unbid suits (at least three cards in each) and shortness in the suit doubled (preferably, no more than two). Normally, the partner of the doubler must bid his best suit but may pass if (a) his right hand opponent intervenes or (b) on the more rare occasions when his hand is such that he wishes to convert the takeout double to a penalty double.

== Requirements ==
Commonly a double is considered for takeout whenever one of the following conditions is met (but see balancing double below):

- Opponents have previously bid only one suit, and the player did not have chance to double that suit before.
- Opponents have previously bid two suits, and partner has passed.
- Opponents have found a fit.

Most common requirements to make a takeout double are:

- Shortness in the opponents' suit(s) - preferably two or less, three at most
- Length in each unbid suit - preferably four cards, at minimum three
  - Some partnerships play that the double of a major promises four or more cards in the other major
- High card point (HCP) strength of at least a minimal opening bid - 11 or more HCP
  - More high-card strength is required when opponents have bid on higher levels (e.g. preempted).

The most common treatment is that the fewer high card points the hand possesses, the more strict are the distribution requirements (i.e. opponent's suit(s) shorter and unbid suits longer). With stronger hands a common treatment is to double first, regardless of distribution, and then make your bid even when it differs from partner's bid:

- 16+ HCP and a good six-card suit can convert partner's bid to this suit
- 18+ HCP and a good five-card suit can convert partner's bid to this suit
- 19+ HCP balanced with a stopper in opener's suit can convert partner's bid to notrump
- Exception: 15-18 HCP balanced hands with a stopper in opener's suit usually make a 1NT overcall instead of a takeout double

Partnership agreement is required on the level to which Takeout doubles apply. A typical treatment is that a double up to the level of 4♥ is takeout, while doubles on higher levels are for penalties or "cooperative" (i.e. the partner is supposed to pass unless his distribution and/or strength indicates that playing a contract of their own on a higher level is a better prospect). However an alternative is to play takeout doubles even higher for several reasons:

- It is rare to hold a "true" penalty double (length and strength in opponent's suit)
- With highly distributional hands it is possible for both sides to have a making game
- Usually the preemptive bid is designed to be sacrifice (in the expectation that the penalty score will be less than the score for the making game or slam)

Sometimes a “shape” double can be made on less than 12 HCP and can be made with 9+ HCP but requires 4 cards in all unbid suits (if only 1 suit bid by opponents) or 5–4 in unbid suits (if 2 suits already bid by opponents)

== Examples ==
1) ♠ Q974 ♥ 9 ♦ AJ93 ♣ KJ85	This hand is a minimal takeout double when the opponent opens 1♥. With other opening bids, it should be passed. Also, if the opening bid was 3♥, the hand would be not strong enough to double.
2) ♠ KQ83 ♥ A52 ♦ 10 ♣ AJ1062	If opponents have bid 1♦ – 1♥, the takeout double shows the unbid suits (spades and clubs)
3) ♠ KJ63 ♥ AQ2 ♦ A84 ♣ Q93	With 16 balanced points, this hand is more suitable for a 1NT overcall over any opening bid rather than for a takeout double.
4) ♠ KQJ1063 ♥ AK72 ♦ A4 ♣ 6	With 17 points and an excellent spade suit, this hand should double RHO's opening bid in any of clubs, diamonds or hearts rather than overcall in spades. Whatever partner bids, a subsequent bid of spades will indicate a stronger hand than a simple overcall.
5) ♠ 8 ♥ AQ1094 ♦ KJ107 ♣ A83	Over an opening bid of 1♠ this hand can double or overcall 2♥ depending on style and agreements. However, over an opening bid of 1♥, it should pass, expecting to double the opponents' subsequent heart or notrump bids for penalties.

== Responses ==
=== Opponents pass ===
If the RHO passes, the advancer (the doubler's partner) is forced to bid and should make a descriptive bid indicating suit length, high-card strength and any stoppers:

- Showing the shape:
  - With a longest suit bid this
  - With 2 suits of equal length but different rank (1 major and 1 minor) favour the major suit (as this will typically score better whether in a part-score, game or slam)
  - With 2 suits of equal length and rank bid the stronger suit
  - With 3 suits of 4 cards bid the (better) major
  - With a balanced hand and at least 1 stopper in the opponent's suit bid notrump
  - With an opening strength hand and no clear strain, a cue bid of opponents' suit is often used to set up a game forcing auction and asking doubler to describe their hand
  - When advancer's best suit is the opponent's suit, the takeout double can be passed for penalties and this is described in more detail below
- Showing the strength when bidding a suit:
  - 0-8 HCP - bid at the lowest available level in a suit (an expression sometimes used is "no more than an Ace and a King)
  - 9-11 HCP make a jump-bid
  - 12+ HCP jump to game, or if the strain is unclear, a cue bid of opponents' suit is often used to set up a game forcing auction and asking doubler to describe their hand
- Showing the strength when bidding notrump:
  - 8-10 HCP bid 1NT
  - 11-12HCP bid 2NT
  - 13+ HCP bid 3NT

The strength requirements above are lowered when the partner is known to be stronger (e.g. an opponent's preempt is doubled), and raised when partner can be weak (as in protective position).

One conventional variation (Bungay Black Dog Double) is that 1NT shows 6+ points and the cheapest bid in a suit is a natural "weak squeak" denying 6 points.

=== Opponents bid ===
If the RHO bids advancer is not forced to make a bid so, if one is made, it is a free bid and different strength ranges are used although the guidance on showing the shape remains the same except for the availability of the double as a new bid:

- Showing the strength when bidding a suit:
  - 0-5 HCP pass
  - 6-8 HCP bid at the lowest available level (can compete at the 2 level)
  - 9-11 HCP jump bid or compete at the 3 level
  - 12+ HCP bid the game or cue bid the opponents' suit
- Showing the strength when bidding notrump:
  - 8-10 HCP bid 1NT
  - 11-12HCP bid 2NT
  - 13+ HCP bid 3NT

== A special case for 1NT ==
Typically doubles of notrump bids are for penalty, the exception is when opponents make a "dustbin" notrump bid:

West	North	East	South
1♦	Pass	1NT	?

In this case, responder is not showing a balanced hand but denying both support for opener and the values to make a two-level bid so a double is for takeout in this situation. However attention must be paid to the likely meaning of the 1NT bid. In this case, responder is likely to have long clubs so it will be safe for North–South to play in hearts or spades.

West	North	East	South
1♥	Pass	1NT	?

Spades would be considered a safe suit but East might have length in clubs or diamonds.

West	North	East	South
1♠	Pass	1NT	?

There are no safe suits, East might have length and strength in any suit below spades. In addition, opener might have a second suit but have decided against bidding at the two-level given responder's weakness. In addition, since East-West may not have a fit it is possible that North-South do not have a fit and might end up at the two-level doubled so will need to exercise caution when vulnerable.

== Later-round takeout doubles ==
Double can be for takeout even in later rounds of bidding. As before, it denotes support for unbid suits and, often, extra values. In general, any low-level double after opponents have bid a suit (especially if they have found a fit) and partner has passed is generally played for takeout:

- the opener himself can double for takeout in the second round of bidding, after the opponents have entered the auction and partner had (usually) passed
- also, an overcaller can second-round double as well, to show extra values and support for unbid suits.
- a first-round takeout doubler can make a takeout double again, with a strong hand (around 16+ points)

1) 1♣ – (1♠) – pass – pass; Dbl	This type of is referred to as "reopening double", and shows shortness in spades and support for other suits
2) 1♦ – (1♠) ; Dbl	Shows 4+ cards in the unbid suits. See negative double.
3) 1♣ – Dbl – pass – 1♠; Dbl	Again, the opener has shortness in spades and support for other three suits.
4) 1♣ – (1♥) – pass – (2♥); Dbl	This shows shortness in hearts, but the opener must have extra strength, as the responder is forced to bid on level 2 or 3.
5) (1♦) – 1♠ – (2♦) – pass; (pass) – Dbl	The overcaller shows shortness in diamonds, and at least 3 cards in hearts and clubs, with some extra values for the overcall.
6) (1♥) – Dbl – (2♥) – pass; (pass) – Dbl	The original doubler shows extra values and/or extreme shortness in hearts.

=== Balancing (protective) doubles ===
Balancing (commonly called protective in England) doubles occur when the doubler had to choose between passing and ending the auction or bidding again to reopen the auction. Distribution and strength requirements for a takeout double are lowered in this situation. A common expression is "borrow a King" meaning that the balancing doubler can add 3 points to their hand and then bid according to strength guidance. So in this case a balancing double can be made with as little as 8HCP. and in some situations as little as 6HCP.

West	North	East	South
1♥	Pass	Pass	?

South, holding ♠ Q863 ♥ 84 ♦ A85 ♣ K1054 can now double, expecting to find partner with strength and likely length in hearts, allowing him to pass for penalties or make a bid and this is a case for bidding with a little as 6HCP with the right holding, shortness in hearts is particularly important and 4+ in all other suits would be ideal.

West	North	East	South
		1♥	Pass
2♥	Pass	Pass	?

Although the bidding is a level higher East-West have found a comfortable fit and will probably be happy to play there. This suggests that North–South also have a fit and should be very keen to enter the auction. Competing at the three level might be risky as the major auction says very little about the minor suit holdings of East-West. South should double with 10+HCP and shortness in hearts.

West	North	East	South
		1♣	Pass
2♣	Pass	Pass	?

As above South should be keen to compete (assuming East - West play traditional methods rather than inverted minors) but the auction has suggested that east–west don't hold length in any other suits (and the majors in particular).

West	North	East	South
1♣	Pass	1♥	Pass
2♥	Pass	Pass	?

South, holding ♠ Q863 ♥ 984 ♦ K1085 ♣ AJ was not strong enough to double in the first round. However, he can expect the partner to have shortness in hearts and likely 4 cards in spades or diamonds, and thus make a balancing takeout double. Such doubles are more frequent on matchpoint scoring, where even a penalty of −100 for the failure to make 2♠ can be profitable against −110 or −140 that the opponents could score in 2♥.

West	North	East	South
1♣	1♠	Pass	Pass
?			

West's double denotes shortness in spades and support for the other, unbid suits with a hand such as ♠ 7 ♥ AJ85 ♦ K63 ♣ AQ1052.

Reopening doubles once showed extra values as well. With adoption of the negative double, however (a takeout double by responder), responder must pass with length and strength in the opposing suit. In order to protect against such situations, opener is obliged to double even with thin values, whenever his distribution is suitable. Some pairs even require opener to act somehow; responder's pass is forcing.

== Equal level conversion doubles ==
This convention (also referred to as ELCD) can change the meaning of doubler bidding a new suit in some situations, for example:

West	North	East	South
1♥	Dbl	Pass	2♣
Pass	2♦	Pass	?

This does not promise the extra values in diamonds but shows a hand with 5 diamonds and 4 spades and the values for a normal takeout double. In this case doubler would need to jump in diamonds to show the stronger hand. Some partnerships only play the convention in a sequence like this converting clubs to diamonds. The name is derived from the fact that doubler is converting partner's bid at the same level.

West	North	East	South
1♥	Dbl	Pass	1♠
Pass	2♦	Pass	?

This sequence does show a strong diamond hand as doubler has converted at a higher level.

Some partnerships also play this convention when holding 5–4 in the majors but with a hand that is neither weak nor strong and, therefore, they cannot use a 2 suited bid (e.g. Michael's cue bid).

== See also ==
- Negative double
- Negative free bid
- Support double
