= Useful space principle =

Principle of bridge bidding

The Useful space principle in the game of contract bridge was first articulated in a series of six articles in The Bridge World, published from November 1980 through April 1981.

In essence, the principle asserts that the best bridge conventions and systems are those that take up the least bidding space. The core reason for this is it leaves the maximum possible bidding space in which to explore the possibility of a slam.
