= Ghestem =

In the game of bridge, Ghestem is a conventional overcall structure, using 2NT, 3♣, and the (non-jump) cuebid over an opposing opening at the one level to denote two-suited hands in two of the remaining three suits.

This convention was devised by the French bridge and checkers player Pierre Ghestem.

When playing Ghestem, after an opposing one-level opening, the three overcalls mentioned denote the three possible two-suited hands in the suits excluding the opened suit:

2NT : shows the two lowest-ranking unbid suits

3♣ : shows the two highest-ranking unbid suits

Cuebid : shows the top- and bottom-ranking unbid suits

== Requirements ==
The requirement for a Ghestem overcall is a two-suited hand with at least five cards in each suit and opening values. Point counts vary, but it is commonly agreed that a Ghestem bid is constructive and should be made on hands that hold the prospect of winning the auction. If made on very weak hands, there is the danger that if the opponents win the auction they will also have been warned about the distribution of the Ghestem bidder's hand. Given that the Ghestem overcalls are forcing, many partnerships apply no upper limit to the high card strength. Many partnerships also use a much lower minimum strength requirement, or a "weak-or-strong" pattern.

== Responses ==
Invitations are made via jump support bids at the three level (if available), cue bids denote slam interest, a bid in the fourth suit is to play, as are direct game bids. For instance:

(1♦) - 2♦ - (pass) - ??

2♥ : to play (misfit)

2♠ : weak support bid

3♣ : weak support bid

3♠ : invite with spades as trump suit

4♠ : to play

3♦ : slam interest

Following responder's cuebid, the Ghestem bidder makes a relay bid in the next strain, and the bidding continues with the responder indicating the trump suit:

(1♦) - 2♦ - (pass) - 3♦
(pass) - 3♥ - (pass) - 4♣ : slam interest with club support

== Advantages and disadvantages ==
The advantage of Ghestem is that a single bid uniquely specifies the two suits of the overcaller.

The primary disadvantage is the loss of the natural 3♣ jump overcall; furthermore, the artificial 3♣ bid may be prone to partnership misunderstandings. Also, by using 3♣ over an opposing minor opening to denote the two majors, the major suits cannot be introduced at the two level whereas alternative methods such as the Michaels cuebid can. This second disadvantage can be overcome by changing the order of the two suits shown by each bid; methods include RCO, inverted Ghestem (Questem) and Specific Michaels (SpoDo), although the similar and quite popular CRO fails to achieve this.

== Variations ==
Given that over a 1♦ opening the majors have to be introduced at three level, many partnerships who play Michaels have agreed that over an opposing 1♦ opening a modified structure applies that retains the availability of a natural 3♣ overcall:

(1♦) - ??

2NT : shows the lowest two unbid suits

2♦ : shows the top and bottom suits (i.e. blacks)

3♣ : natural

3♦ : shows the major suits

To overcome the problem of having to introduce the majors at the three level over an opposing 1♣, and in order to retain the natural (1♣)-2♣ overcall (indicating a good 5+ card suit), some partnerships also apply a modified structure over 1♣:

(1♣) - ??

2NT : shows the lowest two unbid suits (i.e. reds)

3♣ : shows the pointed suits

2♦ : shows the majors

2♣ : Natural, lead-directional (like a 2♣ overcall over a 1♦/♥/♠ opening)

A modified structure that allows the partnership to introduce the majors at the two-level after both minor suit openings is attributed to Garozzo:

(1♣/1♦) - ??

2NT : shows the lowest two unbid suits

2♣ : natural

2♦ : shows the major suits

3♣ : shows the top and bottom unbid suits (over 1♦ non-forcing)

Notice that in this variation of Ghestem following a 1♣ opening, one retains the option to make a natural 2♣ overcall. This is valuable over an artificial Strong Club 1♣ opening. Alternatively, over natural minor-suit opening bids, the cuebid can be used to show both majors. As (1♦) - 3♣ is non-forcing, partnerships playing Ghestem à la Garozzo can use (1♦) - 3♦ to introduce very strong black two-suiters, or begin with a simple 1♠ overcall.

Other combinations of bids to show the three pairs of suits are possible, such as CRO (Colour-Rank-Other), and have various advantages and disadvantages.

== See also ==
- Michaels cuebid
- Copenhagen Convention
