= Splinter bid =

Convention in contract bridge

In the card game "contract bridge", a splinter bid is a convention whereby a double jump response in a side-suit indicates excellent support (at least four cards), a singleton or void in that side-suit (but preferably not the ace or king), and at least game-going strength. Some partnerships agree that the maximum strength can be only that necessary to reach a game contract; stronger holdings with major suit support instead might temporize with a Jacoby 2NT bid.

The idea was developed independently in 1963 by David Cliff, the first to write about it, and Dorothy Hayden Truscott; it grew out of two earlier bidding tools, the Fragment bid and the Void-Showing bid.

== Examples ==
For example, a four clubs (4♣) response to a one heart (1♥) opening establishes hearts as trump suit and indicates a singleton or void in clubs. Different bidding systems may specify different strengths for responder's hand, e.g. 10-12 high card points (HCP), 10-14 or 11-15, for a splinter. With a strong hand, a responder and opener may be able to make slam on sheer strength, so splinters by responder are best restricted to hands containing a fairly narrow HCP range and a void or a small singleton in the splintered suit. A singleton honor is frowned upon. Although they consume bidding space, splinter bids are very descriptive as they help partner to reevaluate his/her hand: soft honors (a king, queen or jack) in the splinter suit lose value, while honors in the other three suits gain value.

In some positions if a simple bid of the suit would be forcing then a single jump can be a splinter. For example, in a system where 1♥–2♣; 2♦ is a forcing sequence, 1♥–2♣; 3♦ may be used as a splinter. (However, this approach would require a specific agreement in advance—many players use this sequence to denote a strong two-suiter.) Some partnerships use certain single jumps as "mini-splinters" that promise less strength, allowing partner to choose between part-score and game rather than between game and slam.

The short suit in a splinter hand is preferably a small singleton, though it can occasionally be a singleton honor or a void. The idea is that partner can easily tell if he has wasted values in the splinter suit; for example, Axxx is ideal whereas KJ9x is almost worthless.

Opener can also make a splinter bid to agree responder's suit if he is strong enough to be able to force to game if responder was minimum for his bid; see example 2 below. Typically, opener would have 15-18 points for this sequence.

The four diamond bids in the following bidding sequences (with East-West passing throughout) are generally agreed to be splinter bids establishing spades as the trump suit:

North	South
1♠	4♦

North	South
1♣	1♠
4♦	

North	South
1♣	1♥
1♠	4♦

A splinter may occur at the three level. In the following auction, South is showing acceptance of hearts and a singleton in spades.

North	South
1♥	3♠
