= Major suit =

Spades and hearts in contract bridge

In the card game contract bridge, the major suits are spades (♠) and hearts (♥). The major suits are of prime importance for tactics and scoring as they outrank the minor suits while bidding and also outscore them (30 per contracted trick for major suits—compared to 20 for minor suits). Much of the tactics of bidding in bridge revolves around the attempt by partners to find a "fit" in one of the major suits that will allow them to make a game contract. Another reason why the major suits is more desirable than the minor suits is that they need one less trick to make game. Of the two major suits, spades rank higher than hearts.

== Suit combinations ==
Fundamentally, there are three ways to divide four suits into pairs: by color, by rank and by shape resulting in six possible suit combinations.

- Color is used to denote the red suits (hearts and diamonds) and the black suits (spades and clubs).
- Rank is used to indicate the major (spades and hearts) versus minor (diamonds and clubs) suits.
- Shape is used to denote the pointed (diamonds and spades, which visually have a sharp point uppermost) versus rounded (hearts and clubs) suits. This is used only as a mnemonic.

== See also ==
- Standard 52-card deck
- Minor suit
- Two suiter
