= Streamlined Ocean Liner =

Proposed ship design

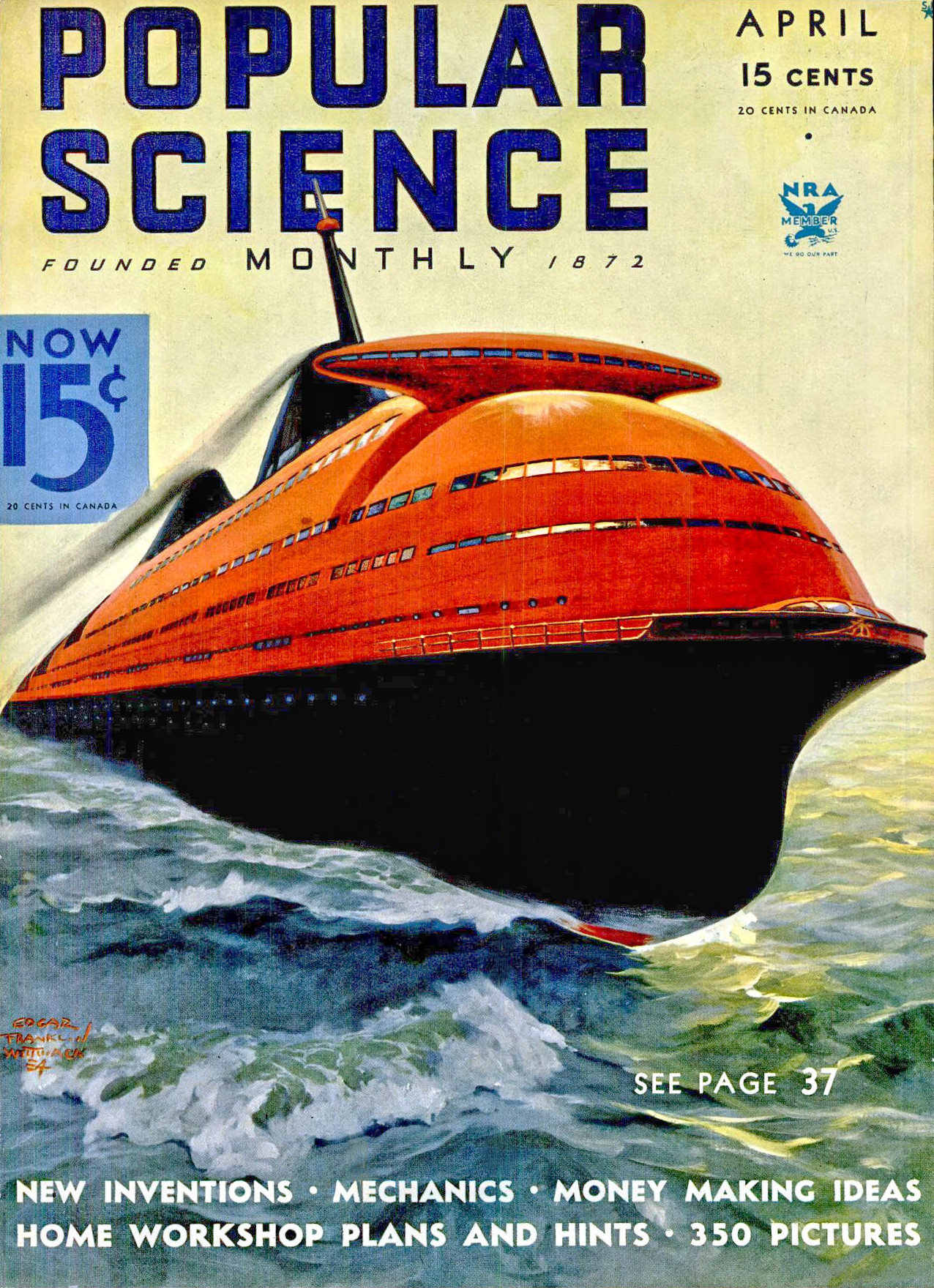
The liner as featured on the cover of Popular Science Monthly, April 1934

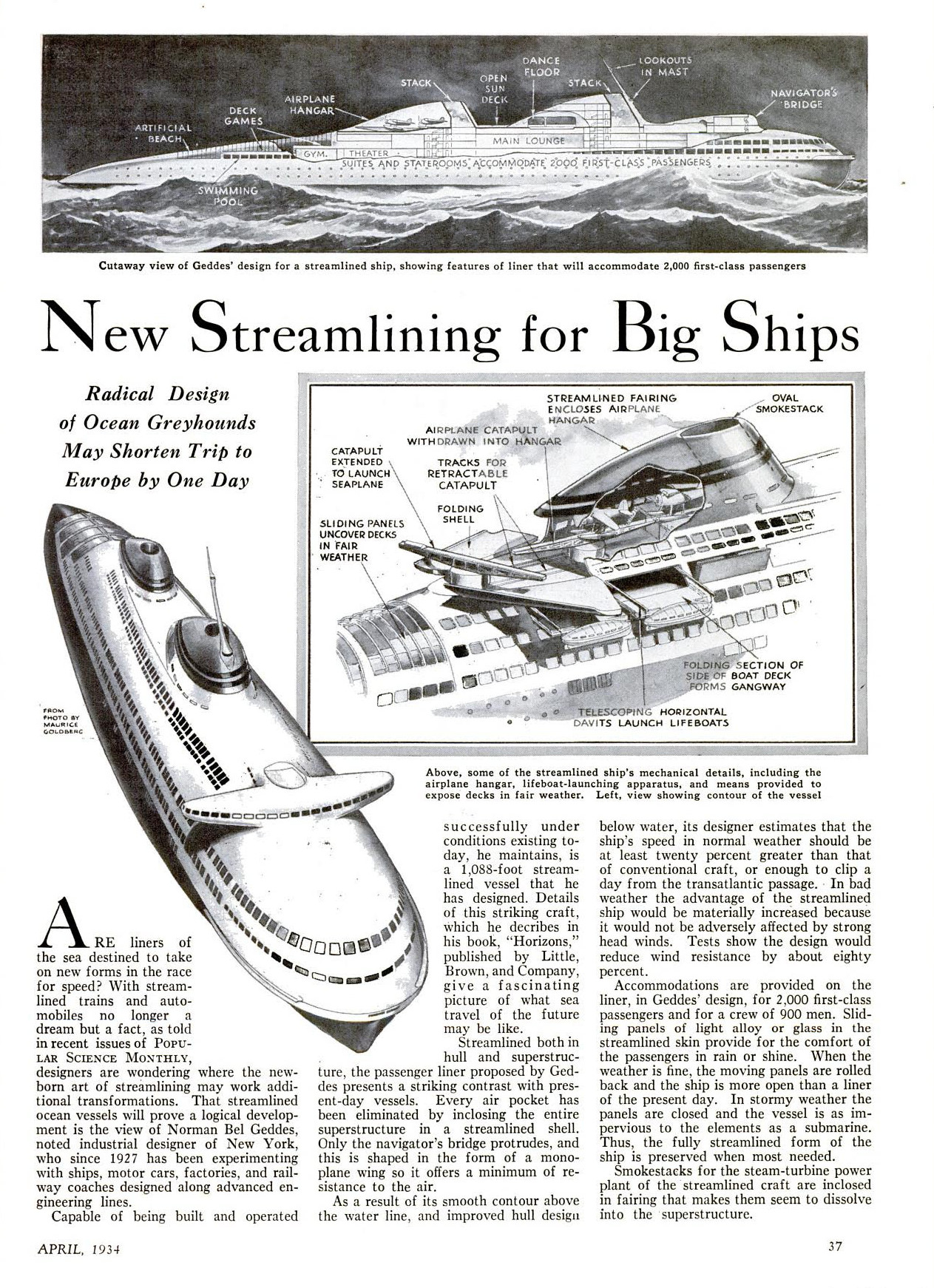
"New Streamlining for Big Ships", Popular Science Monthly, April 1934

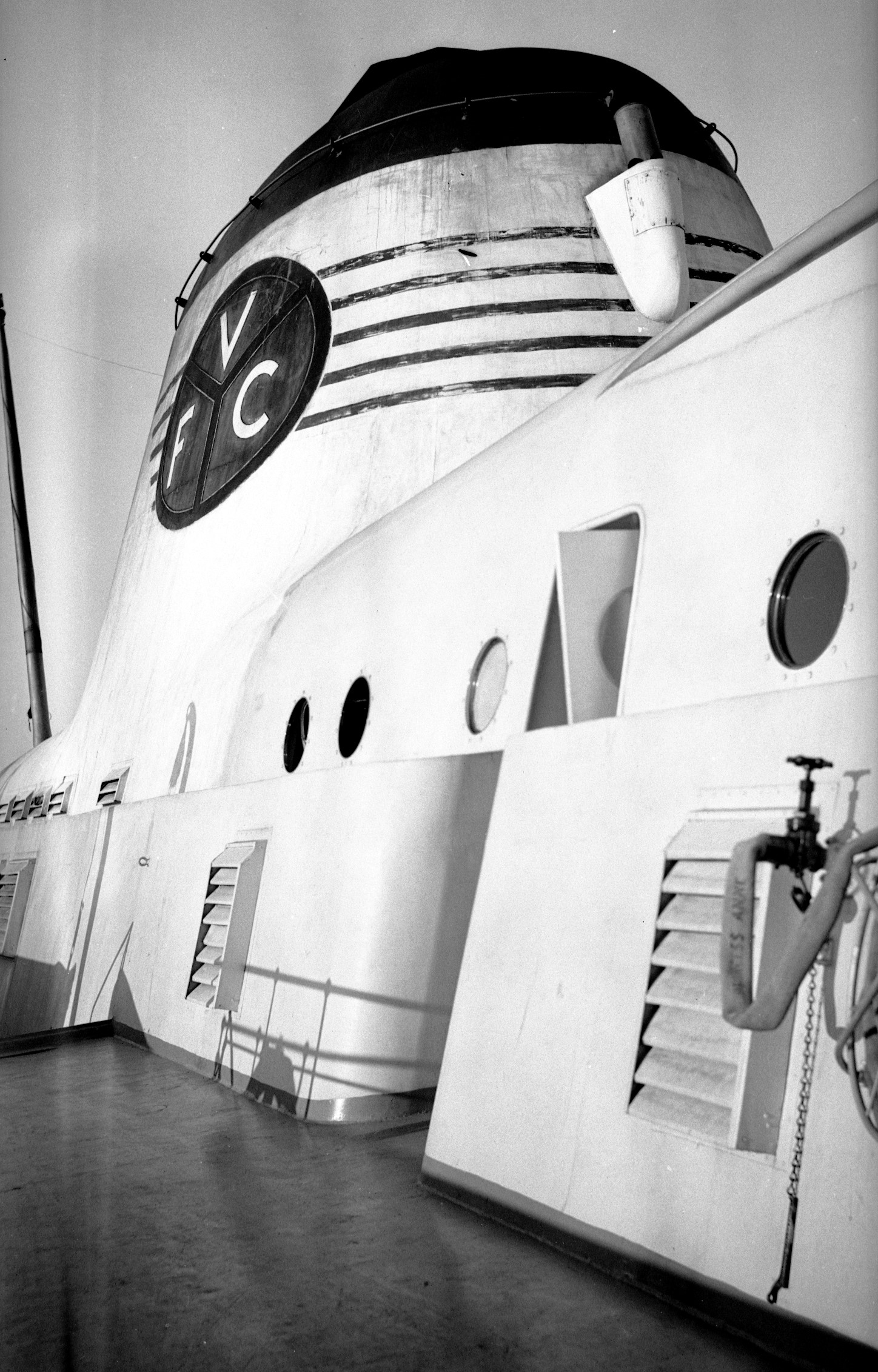
Streamlined superstructure of SS Princess Anne (designed 1933)

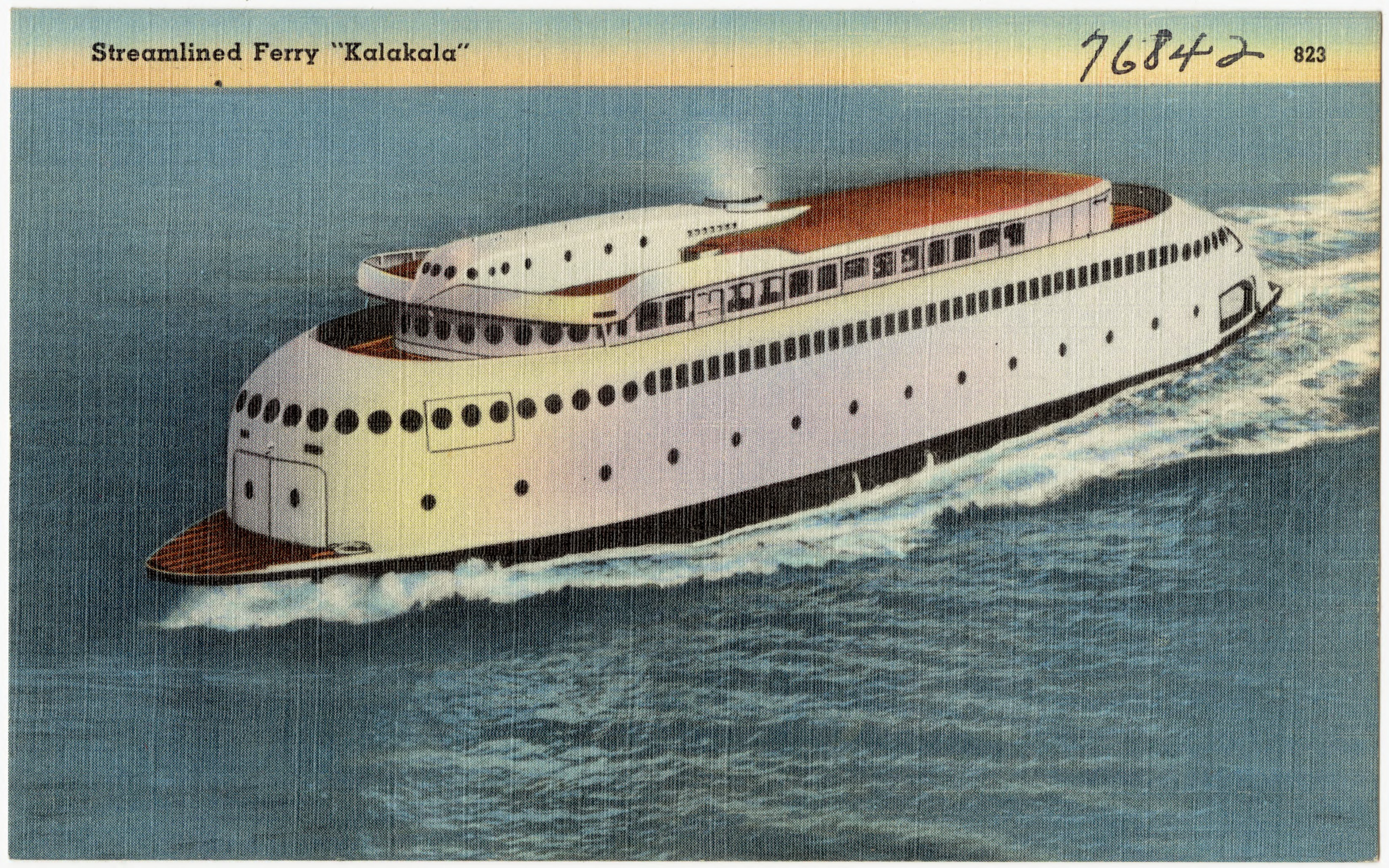
MV Kalakala (1935)

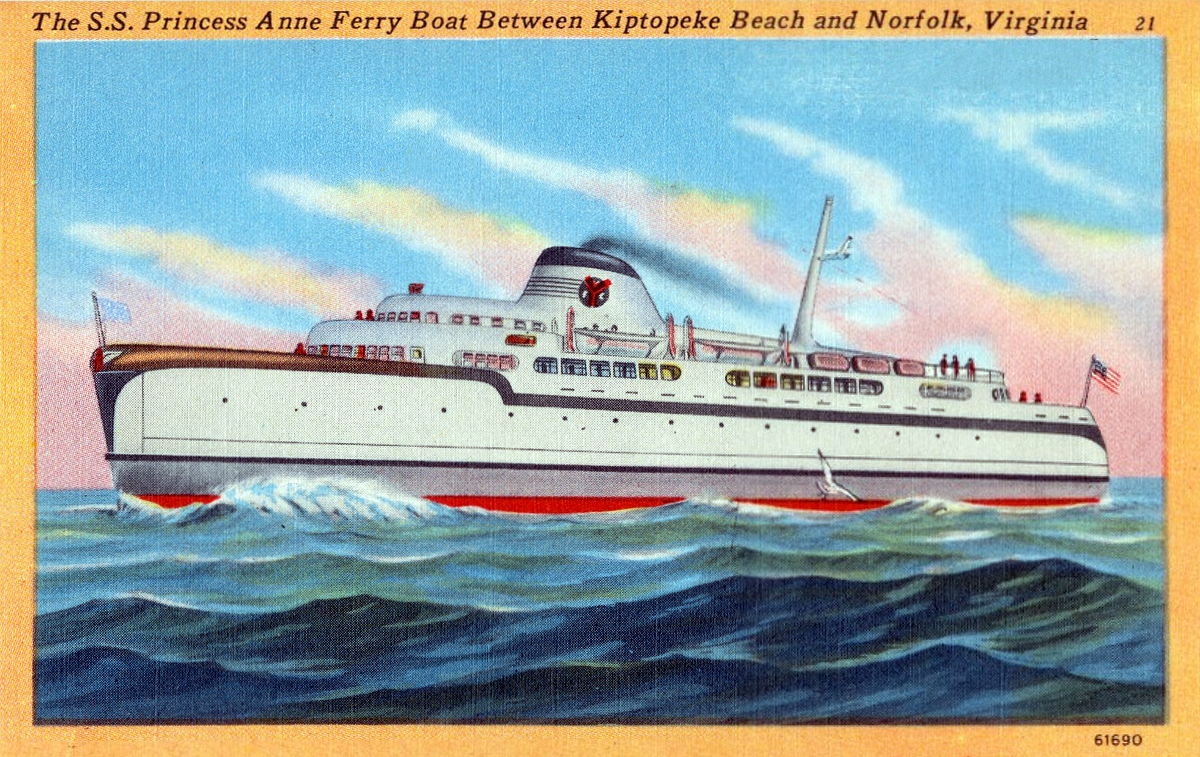
SS Princess Anne under way. Entered service 1936.

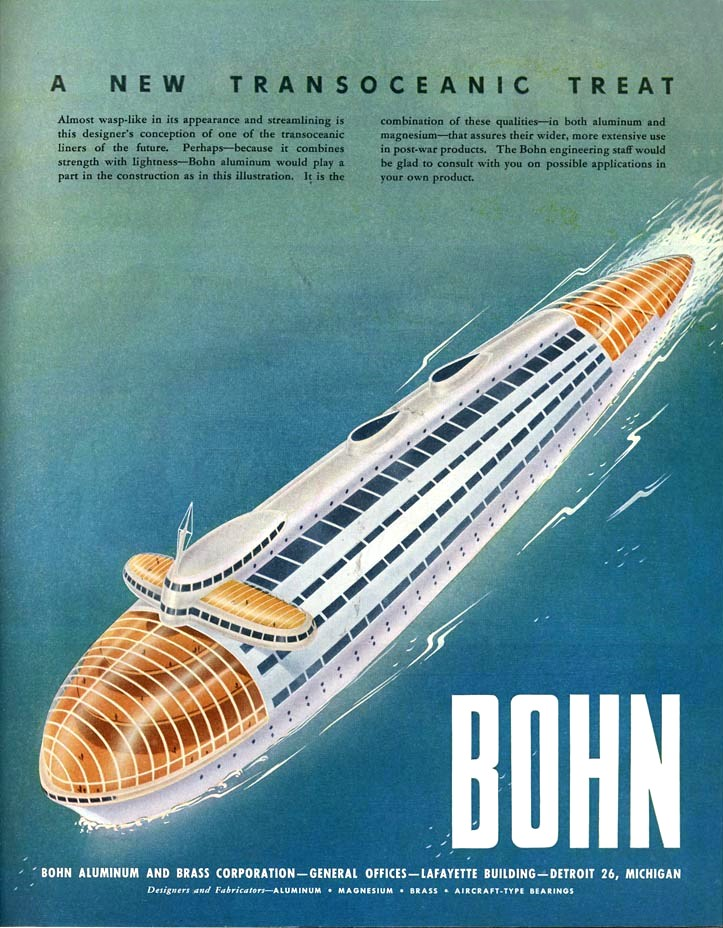
Bohn advertisement showing a streamlined ocean liner (never built). Metal Progress, 1946.

The Streamlined Ocean Liner was a design by Norman Bel Geddes for a streamlined steam-powered ocean liner. The shape was compared by Pathé to that of a porpoise, blunt at the front and tapered at the rear. It first appeared in Geddes' 1932 book Horizons and an outline patent was filed in 1933 with a detailed patent following in 1934. An offer was made for the rights to the design in the late 1930s, which Geddes refused. He still hoped to sell it to an American shipbuilder, but the ship was never built.

== Background ==
Norman Bel Geddes was one of the first industrial designers in the United States. He was one of the pioneers of streamlining in design, producing ambitious and futuristic projects in the 1930s for vehicles, flying cars, aircraft, and consumer goods, only some of which were realized.

== Design ==
The liner was designed by Norman Bel Geddes and his staff as an "office exercise", an ambitious or unusual project of the type that Geddes was in the habit of giving to his staff in the gaps between client commissions. It would have been 1,088 feet (332 m) long with a displacement of 70,000 tons and accommodated 2,000 first-class passengers and 900 crew. Its streamlined form was intended to reduce the effect of wind resistance and improve speed by an estimated 14 percent. The streamlining was created by the cigar shape of the ship, which hid the oval smoke stacks inside the superstructure along with all the other external features of the ship such as lifeboats, walkways, and sundecks. Behind the rear smoke stack were two small aircraft that would normally be hidden. In good weather, parts of the outer skin, which was part transparent, could be slid back to expose recreation areas or, in the event of an emergency, launch the 24 lifeboats.

The only protruding part of the design was the navigator's bridge which was swept back like a monoplane wing in order to reduce wind resistance.

The design first appeared in Geddes' 1932 book Horizons, and in exterior form only in a 1933 patent simply described as "boat" without interior plans or a detailed accompanying text. Geddes also filed a patent in 1933 relating to boat-launching and stowing gear. In 1934 he filed a more detailed patent referring to the earlier two and giving three dense pages of explanatory text.

Also featured in Horizons was a 1932 design for a giant aircraft known as Airliner Number 4 that Geddes saw as a replacement for the ocean liner and which he hoped would cut the travel time from America to England to 42 hours from the four and a half days taken by an ocean liner.

== Reception and legacy ==
In April 1934, the liner was shown on the front cover of Popular Science Monthly with a full-page feature inside, in which it was described as one of the "Ocean Greyhounds". Popular Mechanics used the same phrase in 1935, additionally suggesting that the idea of the streamlined ship had been modeled on the air clipper, describing it as "like a great airliner with its flying bridge".

In 1935, the liner featured in a Pathé newsreel titled "The Liner Of Tomorrow!" in which the narrator explained streamlining and compared the shape of the ship to that of a porpoise, blunt at the front and tapered at the back, saying: "nature evolved this form a long time ago". Encyclopædia Britannica pictured the liner in a supplement titled "Machine-Made Art" (1935), while The New York Sun described it as "a vessel so far removed, yet not without its own beauty of line that our work-a-day brain reels before it".

Despite Geddes' patents, vessels began to appear with a similarity to his such as Raymond Loewy's SS Princess Anne for the Virginia Ferry Company (1933) and the redesigned MV Kalakala (launched 1935) with its aircraft styling.

In the late 1930s, theatrical designer Ernest de Weerth visited Geddes on behalf of the Italian dictator Benito Mussolini and offered to buy all the blueprints, sketches, and rights to the ship for $200,000. Geddes declined, as he still expected to sell the idea to American shipbuilders.

In 2015, cultural commentator Bernhard Siegert commented, "One can see that it is a manmade machine, yet it nonetheless has taken on the appearance of a thing shaped by wind and water, like a smoothly polished bone. Is it supposed to move on, above, or under water?"

Papers relating to the project are held in the Norman Bel Geddes Collection at the Harry Ransom Center at the University of Texas at Austin.

== Patent drawings ==
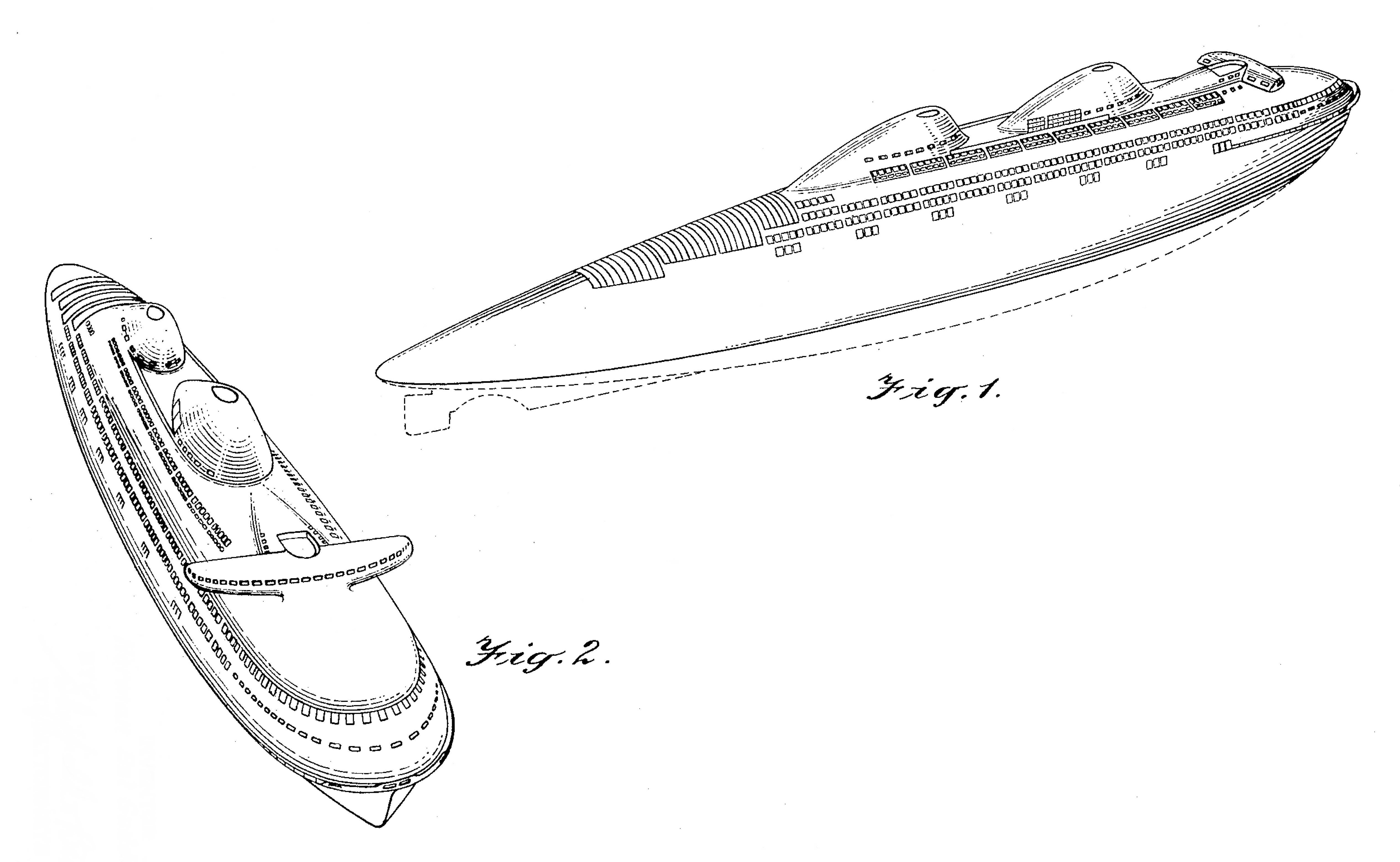
1933

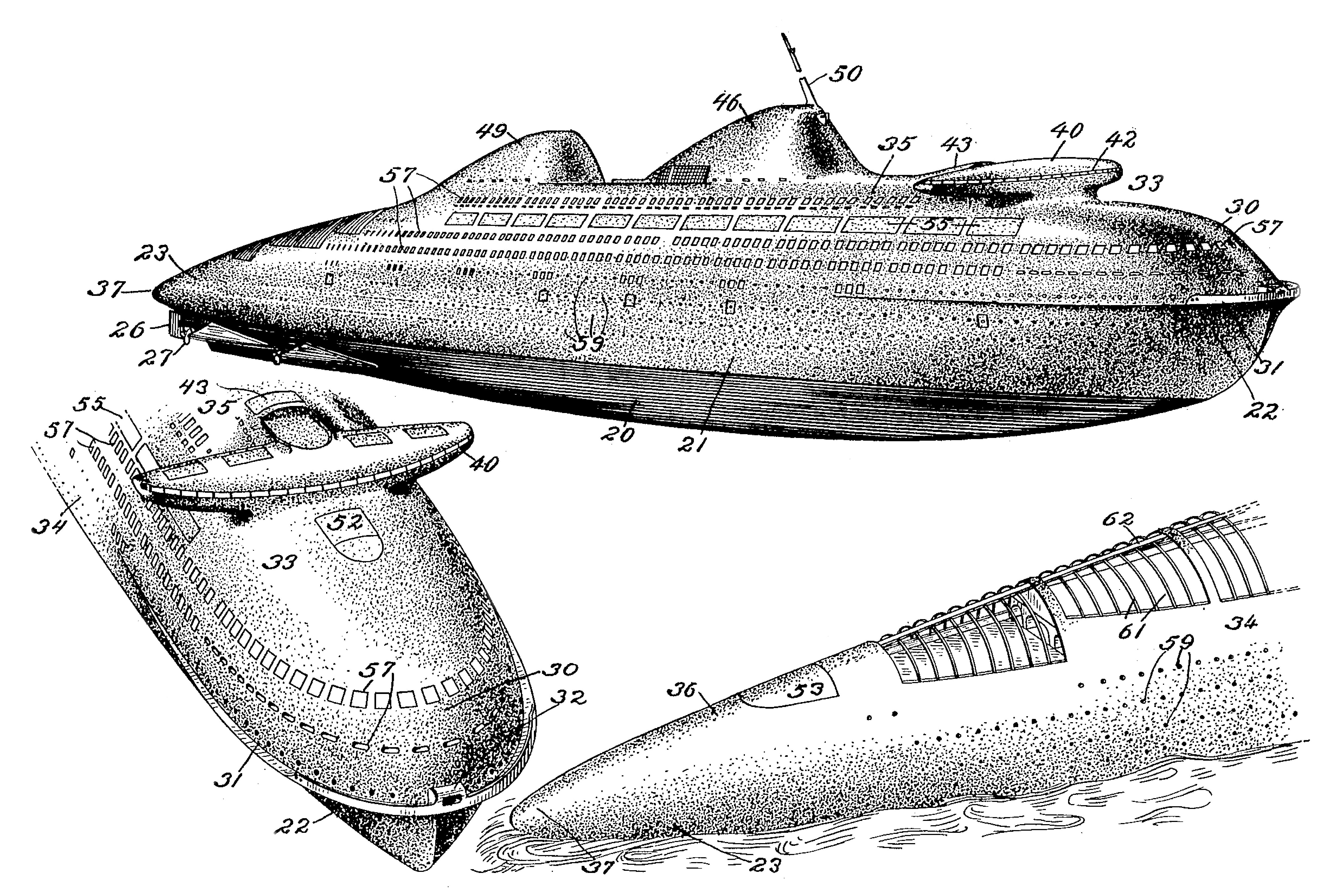
1934

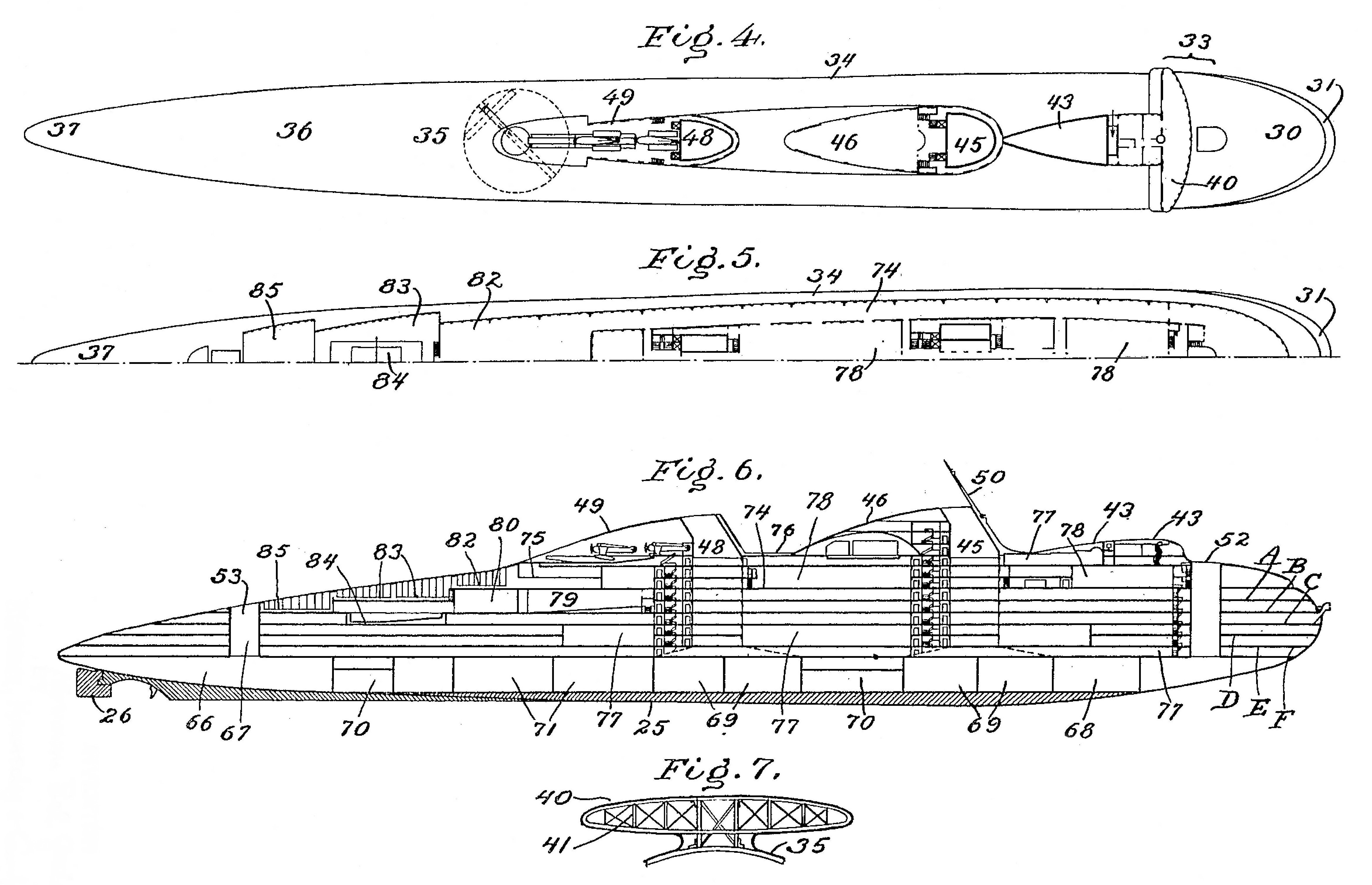
1934

== See also ==
- The Big Broadcast of 1938, a 1938 film that featured the fictional ocean liner S.S. Gigantic based upon the Streamlined Ocean Liner design
