= Airliner Number 4 =

1930s transatlantic aircraft design

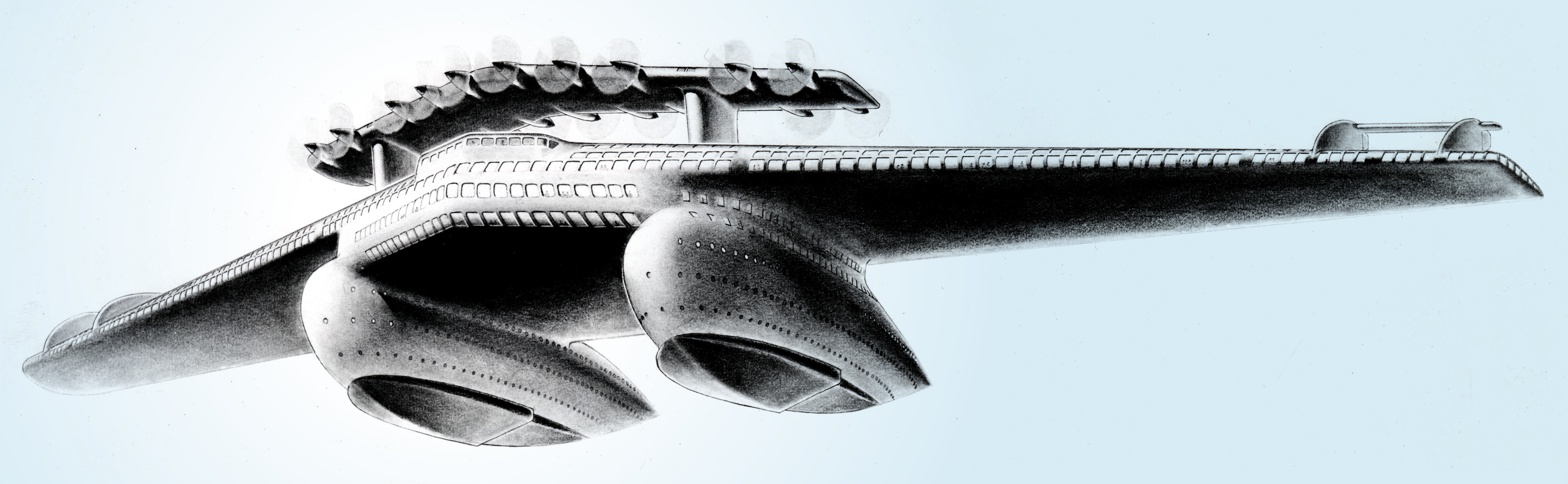
Airliner Number 4, designed by Norman Bel Geddes and Otto A. Koller, c.1929–32

Airliner Number 4 was a design by Norman Bel Geddes and Otto A. Koller for a 9-deck amphibious passenger aircraft intended to replace the large transatlantic liners that traveled between Europe and North America before the Second World War. It was never built.

== Background ==
Norman Bel Geddes was one of the first industrial designers in the United States, and is one of the pioneers of streamlining in design. He produced ambitious and futuristic projects in the 1930s for vehicles, flying cars, aircraft, and consumer goods—only some of which were realised. He was in the habit of giving his staff ambitious or unusual projects when they were between client commissions such as "Get a thousand luxury lovers from New York to Paris fast. Forget the limitations."

== Design ==
Le Corbusier's "airplane of to-morrow" from Vers une architecture, 1923

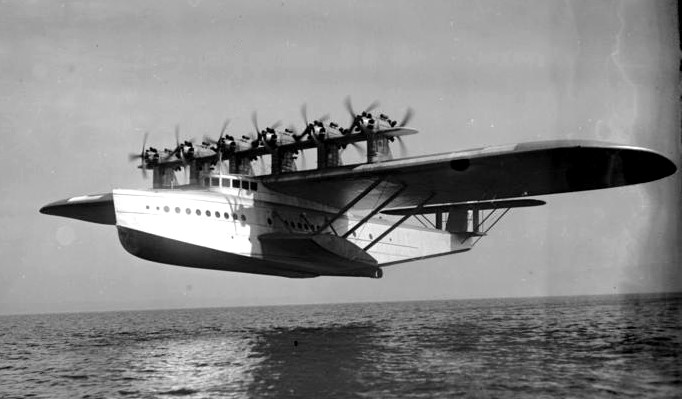
Dornier Do X, designed by Claude Dornier. First flight, 1929.

The aircraft was designed between 1929 and 1932 with the idea of showing "what the intercontinental air liner of 1940 will be like." Geddes developed the overall design concept while German aeronautical engineer Otto A. Koller provided the engineering expertise as Geddes was not a trained engineer. The two had clashed over Airplane Number 1 in January 1930, after Koller had described it as "an absolute[ly] undesirable design." Koller then declined to provide performance specifications for its replacement, Airliner Number 4, which Geddes intended to include for publicity purposes in his upcoming book Horizons (Little Brown, New York, 1932). Geddes devoted over ten pages of the book to the project, including a fulsome endorsement of Koller's skills as an aircraft engineer on page 111 and detailed cut-away plans of the aircraft. Although uncredited in Horizons, the striking illustrations of the aircraft may have been drawn by the young C. Stowe Myers who had his first job in Geddes's office and was tasked with creating the illustrations for the book.

Designed as a V-shaped monoplane with nine decks, large capacity, viewing galleries, and public areas big enough to hold an orchestra, Geddes intended Airliner Number 4 to replace the ocean liner. He wrote that, "Passengers aboard this air liner are able to move about as freely as on an ocean liner, enjoying recreations and diversions similar to those which seagoing passengers are now accustomed." It would have had a wingspan of 528 feet (161 m) and a capacity of 451 passengers plus a crew of 155. Power in the design was provided by twenty 1,900 horsepower (1,400 kW) engines with six in reserve. Each of the two pontoons that supported the plane on water would hold passengers, and also accommodate three lifeboats, sufficient for all persons on board. Two interior hangars would hold smaller aircraft.

It was not the first design to feature a giant wing. Le Corbusier's Vers une architecture (1931 edition) had included an illustration of the "airplane of to-morrow" that featured windows along the edge of the wing like Airliner Number 4, but, unlike it, had three tail fins and the engines mounted behind the wing, rather than above. Geddes described Airliner Number 4 as an "airship" in Horizons (p. 111) and compared his design with that of the largest aircraft so far built — as far as he was aware — the 48-meter wingspan Dornier Do X, which he said could carry 150 people, but not in comfort. The largest-dimensioned aircraft actually built anywhere during the 1930s, the Soviet Union's six/eight-engined, 63-meter wingspan Tupolev Maksim Gorki, was not revealed until 1934.

== Planned operations ==
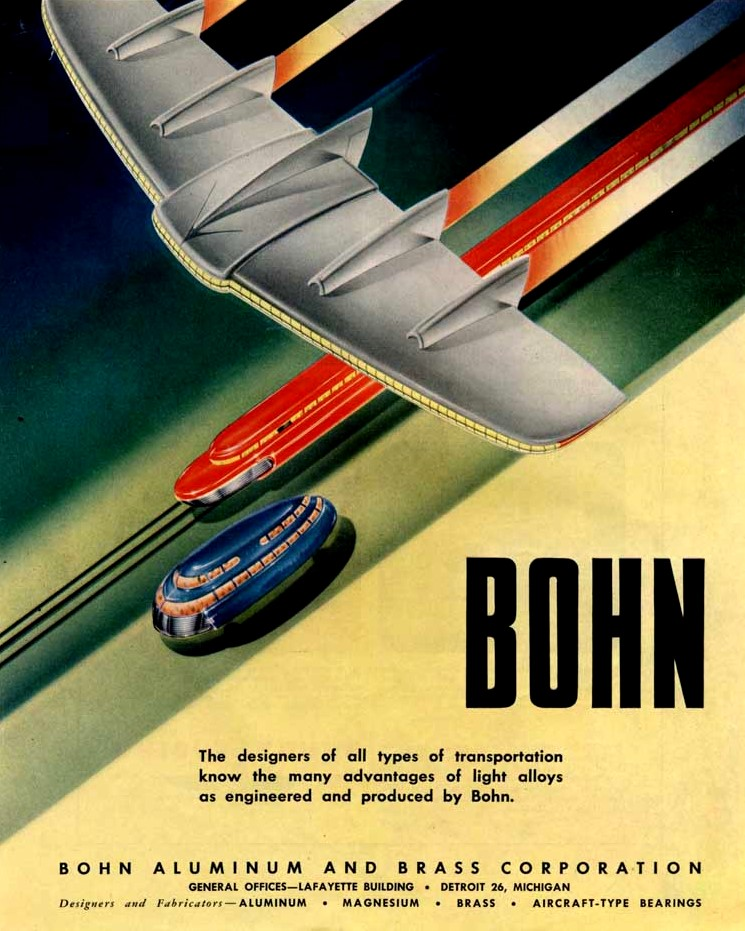
Bohn Aluminum advertisement, 1947

Geddes claimed in Horizons to have had interest in the project from Chicago businessmen and that in-air refueling over Newfoundland would let the plane make the trip from Chicago to London in 42 hours, rather than the single Atlantic crossing per week of the fastest ocean liners. He believed that the aircraft could be built and fitted out for $9 million, and that making three Atlantic crossings a week with ticket prices comparable to those charged by ocean liners, it would pay for itself in three years by contrast with the $60 million construction cost of a liner.

Airliner Number 4 would have been amphibious, but Geddes also included in Horizons plans for a floating airport near the shore of Manhattan Island, New York, and other airport designs for the time he foresaw when air travel would be as important as rail travel.

Alongside Airliner Number 4, Geddes was working on designs for a Streamlined Ocean Liner, which also featured in Horizons, and for which he filed an outline patent in 1933 and a detailed patent in 1934. That design also was never built.

== Publicity and legacy ==
Airliner Number 4 received widespread publicity and featured in The Detroit News in January 1933, drawn by J. L. Kraemer alongside photographs of other Geddes designs.

Christopher Innes has written that the giant aircraft flown by the engineers and mechanics of Alexander Korda's 1936 film Things to Come, based on the H. G. Wells novel The Shape of Things to Come (1933), resembles Geddes' designs in Horizons. The starring role in the film was taken by Raymond Massey, who had acted in Geddes' production of Hamlet. The design, or ideas circulating about large aircraft in the 1930s and 1940s, may also have influenced the design of Howard Hughes' huge 1947 Hughes H-4 Hercules "Spruce Goose", but this has not been confirmed. Bohn Aluminum featured an imaginary aircraft in the form of a giant wing in their advertising in 1947. In 2009, Airliner Number 4 was the subject of a 1/288 model kit by Fantastic Plastic.

Papers relating to Airliner Number 4 are held in the Norman Bel Geddes Collection of the Harry Ransom Center at the University of Texas at Austin.
