= SS Princess Anne =

- Princess Anne, after her lengthening from 246 to 335 ft.

History
- Owner: Virginia Ferry Corp. (1932–64); Delaware River and Bay Authority (1964–79)
- Operator: See owners
- Route: Little Creek, VA – Kiptopeke Beach, VA (1932–64); Cape May, NJ – Lewes, DE (1964–79); Fire Island, NY – Block Island, RI (1979–8?)
- Builder: Sun Shipbuilding & Drydock Co. (Chester, PA)
- Cost: $691,000
- Launched: 18 May 1936
- Completed: July 1936
- Maiden voyage: 10 July 1936
- In service: 1936 – mid-1980s
- Renamed: New Jersey (1964); Greenport (1979)
- Identification: ON – 235140
- Fate: Sunk as artificial reef, 1993

General characteristics
- Type: Ferry
- Tonnage: 1585 GRT, 805 NRT
- Length: 246 ft (75 m)
- Beam: 59 ft (18 m)
- Depth: 19 ft 6 in (5.94 m)
- Installed power: Steam engines; 3014 HP
- Propulsion: Twin screw
- Speed: 18 mph (29 km/h; 16 kn)
- Crew: 25

SS Princess Anne was a Virginia Ferry Company (VFC) steamship that plied the route across the Chesapeake Bay between Little Creek, near Norfolk, and Kiptopeke Beach, at the southern end of the Eastern Shore of Virginia. She was known for her streamlined superstructure, designed by Raymond Loewy, which attracted the attention of the newsreels and the nautical press.

Princess Anne continued in service on the Chesapeake Bay until 1964, when the opening of the Chesapeake Bay Bridge–Tunnel made the ferry service redundant. Sold to the Delaware River and Bay Authority, she was renamed New Jersey and placed on a route between Cape May, New Jersey, and Lewes, Delaware. In 1979, she was sold again, renamed Greenport, and subsequently operated between New York and Rhode Island.

After a failed attempt to convert her into a casino ship, she was sunk in 1993 as an artificial reef and scuba diving site off the coast of West Palm Beach, Florida.

== Design and construction ==
Princess Anne was designed by Raymond Loewy in 1933 for the Virginia Ferry Company, a subsidiary of the Pennsylvania Railroad for whom Loewy had done a great deal of design work. Using the hull of an older ferry from within the VFC's fleet as a basis, he created a streamlined superstructure that Christopher Innes has described as possibly influenced by Norman Bel Geddes' 1932 Streamlined Ocean Liner. The paintwork emphasized the sleek form with one unbroken line flowing from stem to stern.

The ship was built in 1936 by the Sun Shipbuilding & Drydock Company of Chester, Pennsylvania. At a cost of $691,000 (equivalent to $16,032,000 in 2025), she was reportedly the most expensive ferry then built in the United States. Her registered tonnages were 1585 gross and 805 net. She was 246 feet (75 m) in length, with a beam of 59 feet (18 m) and a hold depth of 19 feet (5.8 m). Her main deck was divided into six lanes for the transportation of automobiles, which could be driven on and off the vessel through huge doors at the stern and bow. According to a 1940 article in the Keystone Motorist, the ship's 75-car capacity made her one of the world's two largest motor transports. The upper decks were reserved for passengers, 1,200 of whom could be accommodated. Passenger amenities included a restaurant, lunch rooms, a glass-enclosed dining room, a dance hall and promenades.

Princess Anne was powered by two 4-cylinder steam engines with a combined output of 3014 horsepower, driving twin screw propellers, while steam was supplied by oil-fired water tube boilers. Twin rudders were fitted to the ship as an aid to maneuvering. Her speed was 18 miles per hour (29 km/h; 16 kn).

== Service history ==
Princess Anne entered service on 9 July 1936, plying the route between Little Creek (then in Princess Anne County) and Kiptopeke Beach, Virginia, across the Chesapeake Bay, a distance of around 21 miles. The Nautical Gazette recorded the event under the headline "The Svelte "Princess Anne" Makes Her Debut", describing her as "ultra-modern". A Universal Newsreel showed her under way. The ship's regular schedule incorporated four round trips across the bay daily, made between 7 am and 10 pm, a single one-way trip taking approximately two hours.

In early 1954, in response to increasing traffic, Princess Anne was cut in half and lengthened 89 feet (27 m) by the insertion of an additional hull section, giving her a new length of 335 feet (102 m). The modification increased the ship's automobile capacity to 120, while her gross and net register tonnages were recalculated to 2,366 and 1,259 respectively. In spite of such upgrades however, and an increase in the number of ferries, the service struggled to meet demand, and in 1956, the state government began a feasibility study for replacing it with a bridge. Construction on the Chesapeake Bay Bridge–Tunnel began in 1960, and with its opening in April 1964, the ferry service was discontinued. Four of the seven ferries operated by the Virginia Ferry Company were acquired by the Delaware River and Bay Authority, including Princess Anne, which was renamed New Jersey. She and the other three ferries were subsequently placed on a route between Cape May, New Jersey and Lewes, Delaware.

In 1979, New Jersey was sold again. Renamed Greenport, she was assigned to a route between Fire Island, New York, and Block Island, Rhode Island. At some point in the 1980s, she was sold to a consortium which planned to convert her into a casino ship. When this venture failed, she was sold to Derecktor Shipyard in Middletown, Rhode Island, as settlement for outstanding debts.

In 1993, the ship, again under her original name, was sunk off the coast of West Palm Beach, Florida, as an artificial reef and scuba diving site. She sits at a depth of approximately 100 feet and can be located at 26° 47.60' North latitude and 80° 00.20' West longitude.

A set of black and white photographs from 1940 showing migratory workers waiting to board at the Little Creek end of the ferry and travelling on board is in the collection of the Library of Congress.

== Gallery ==
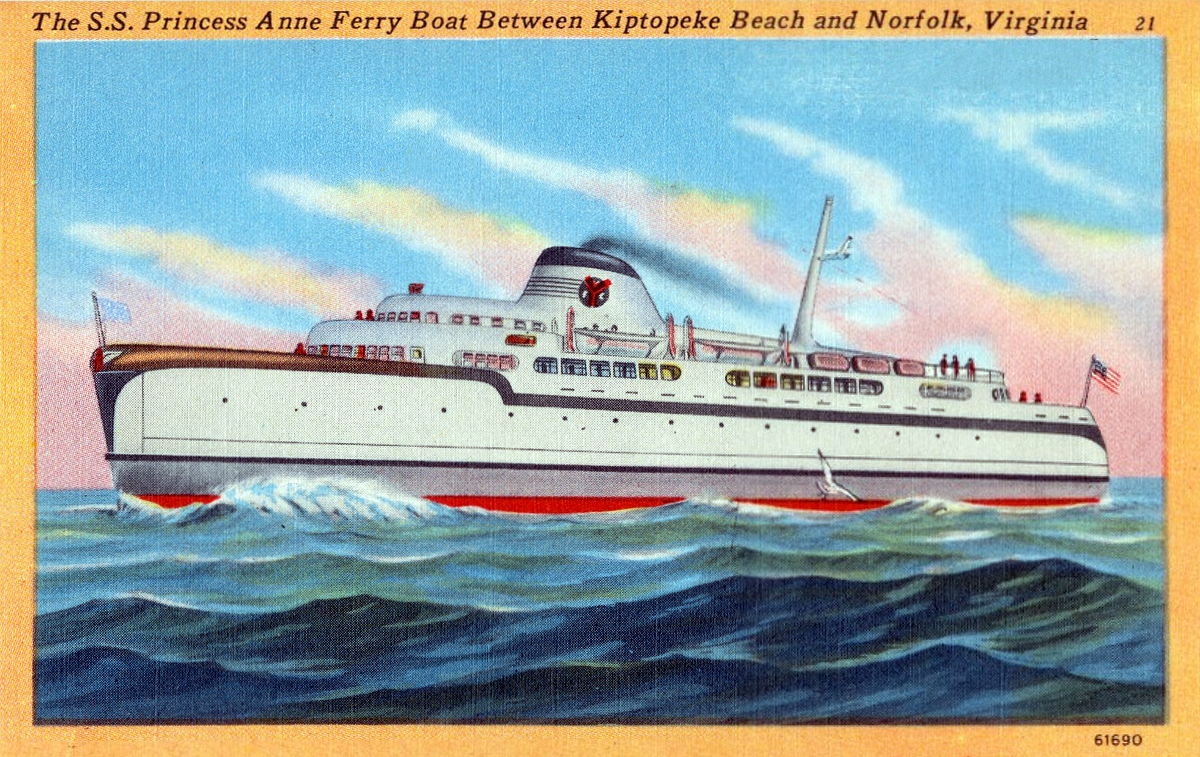
A contemporaneous postcard showing Princess Anne before her lengthening to 335 ft

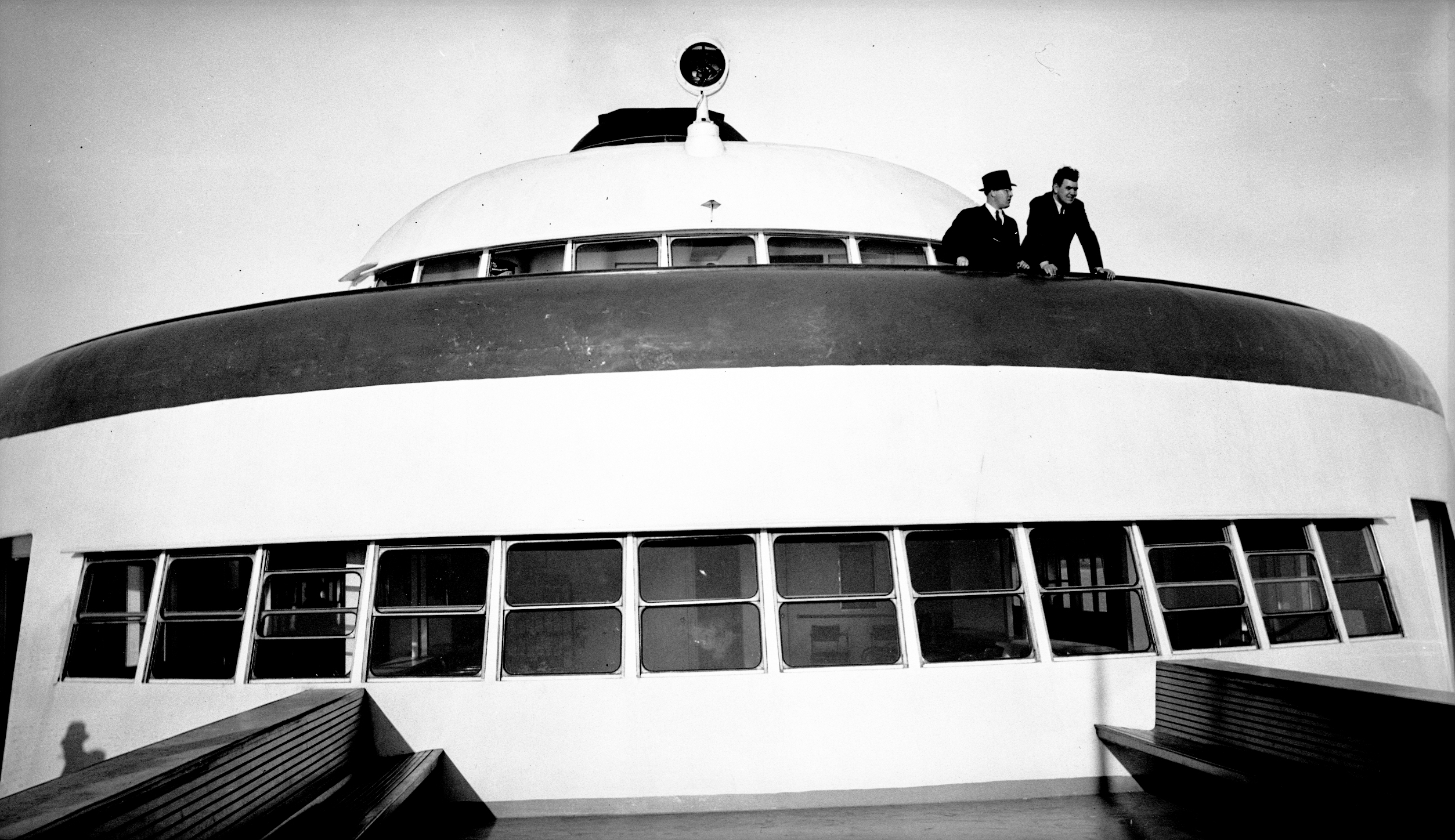
Bridge

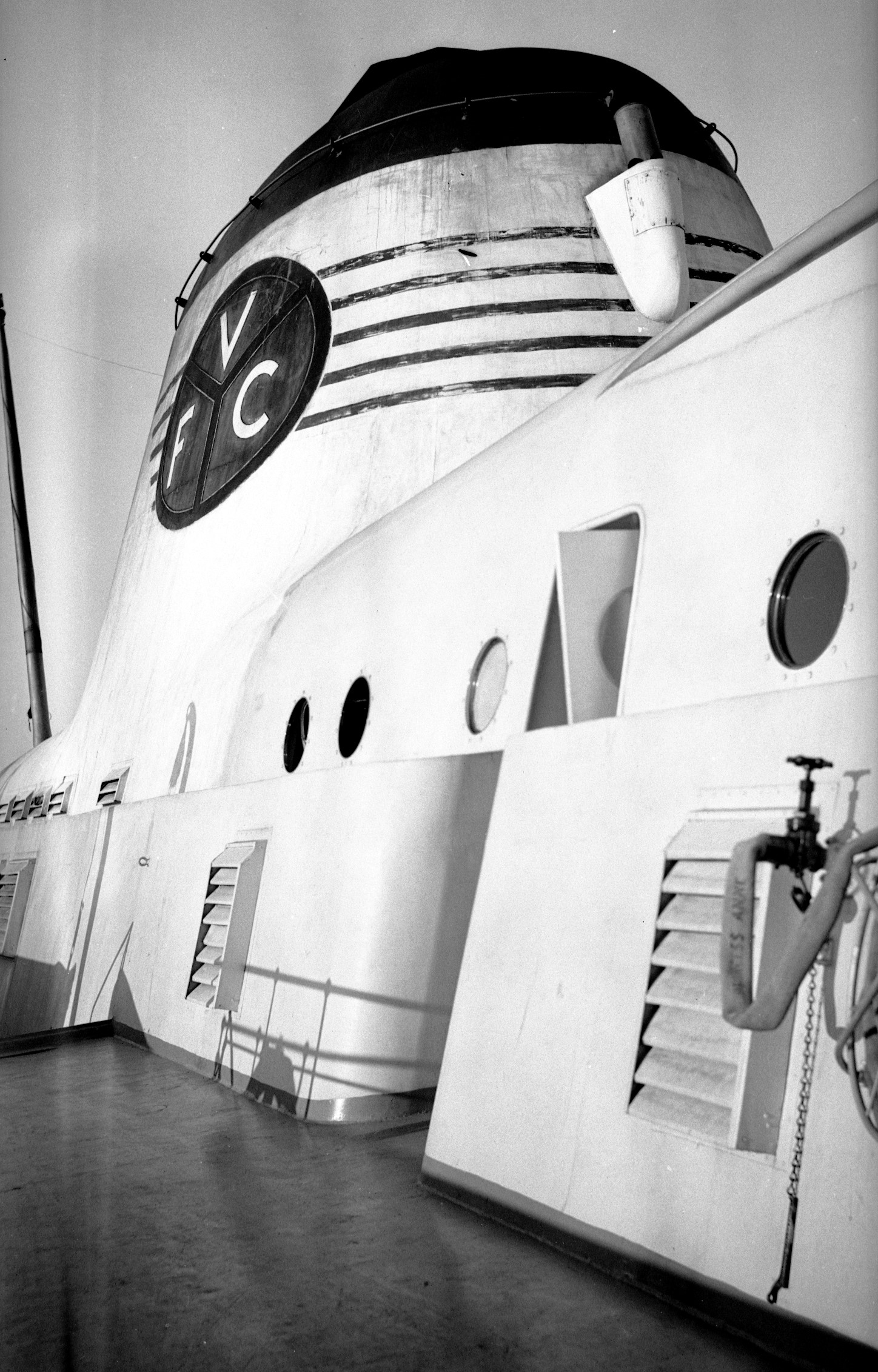
Streamlined funnel

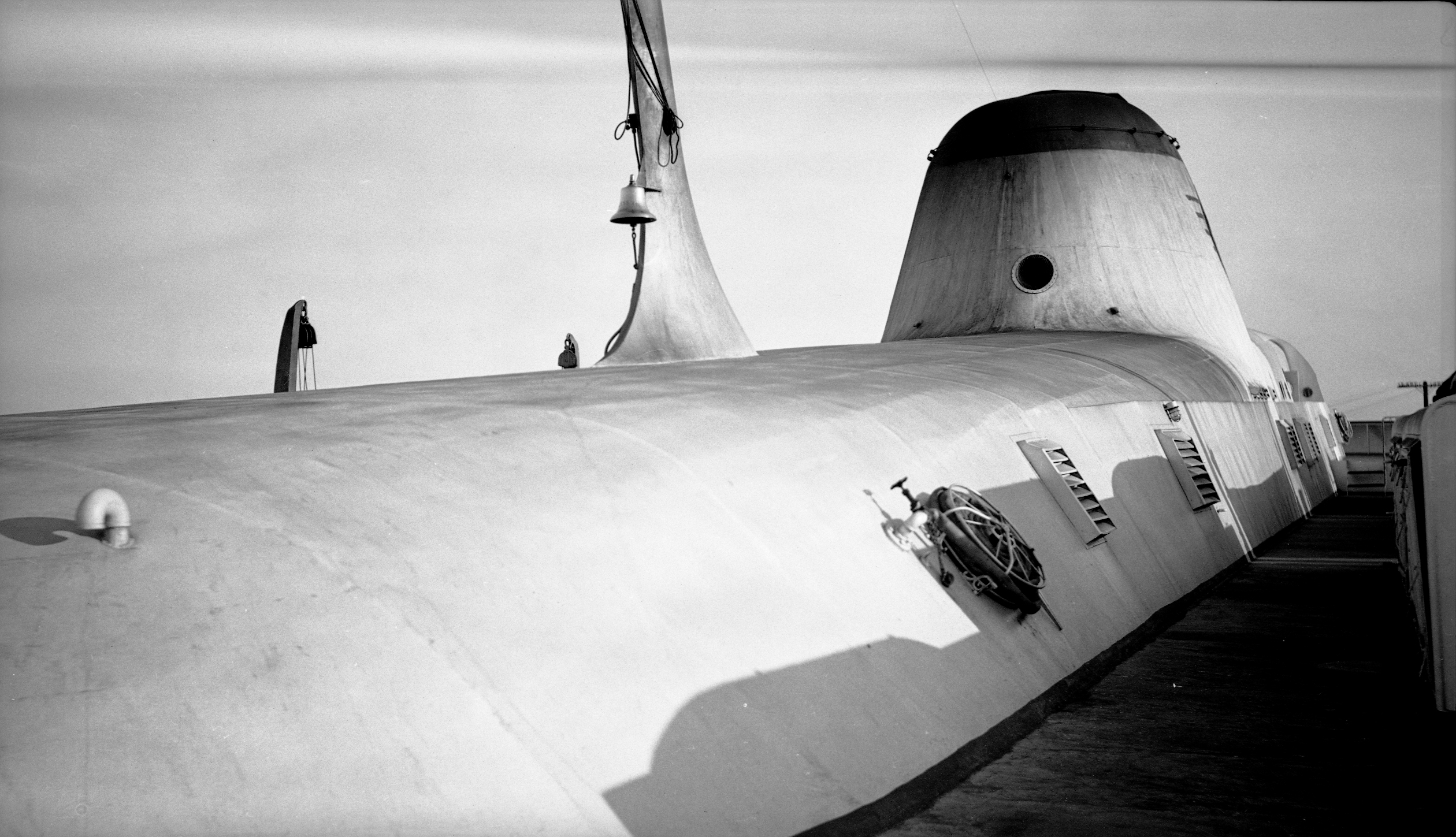
Streamlined superstructure

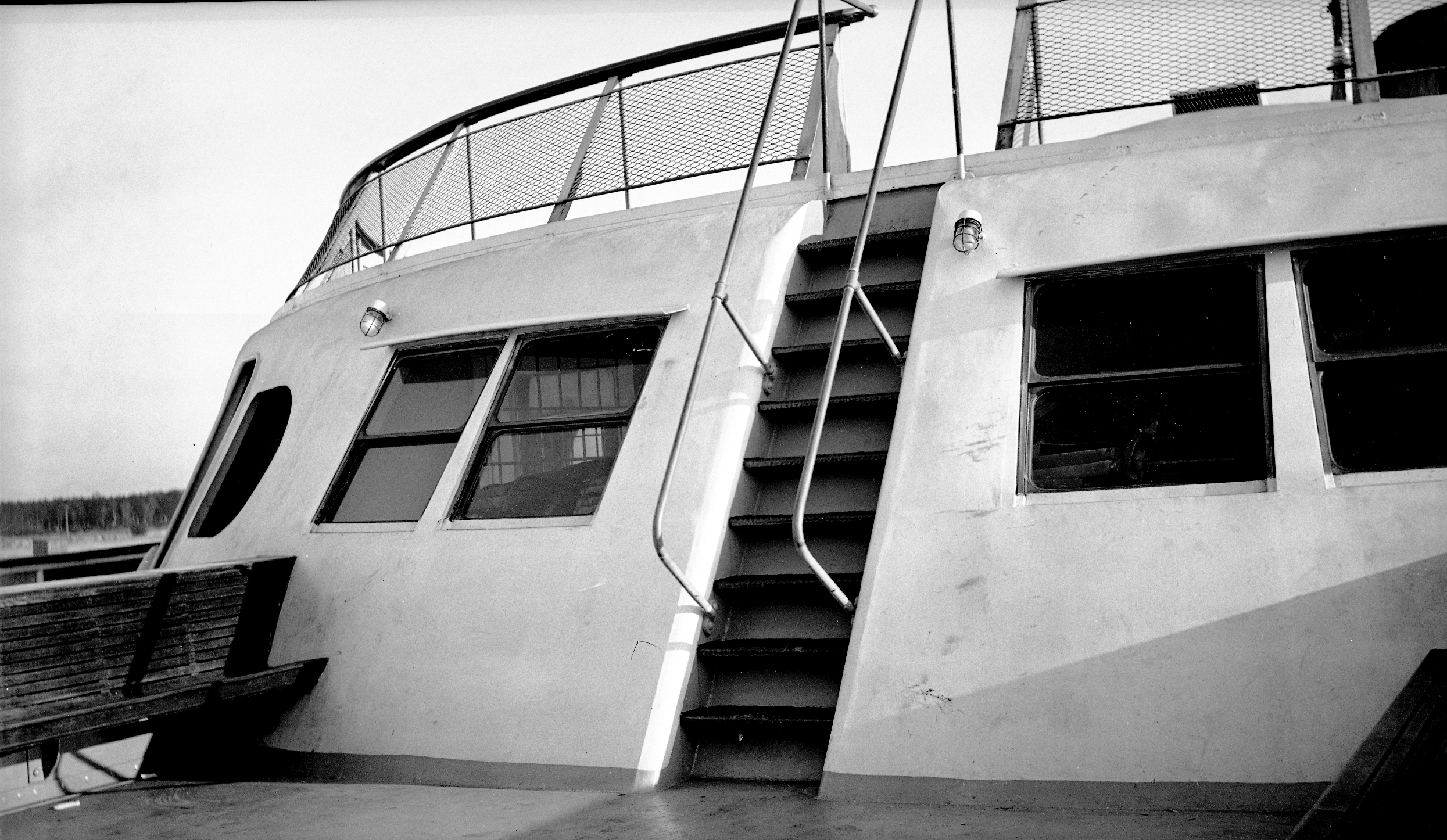
Superstructure

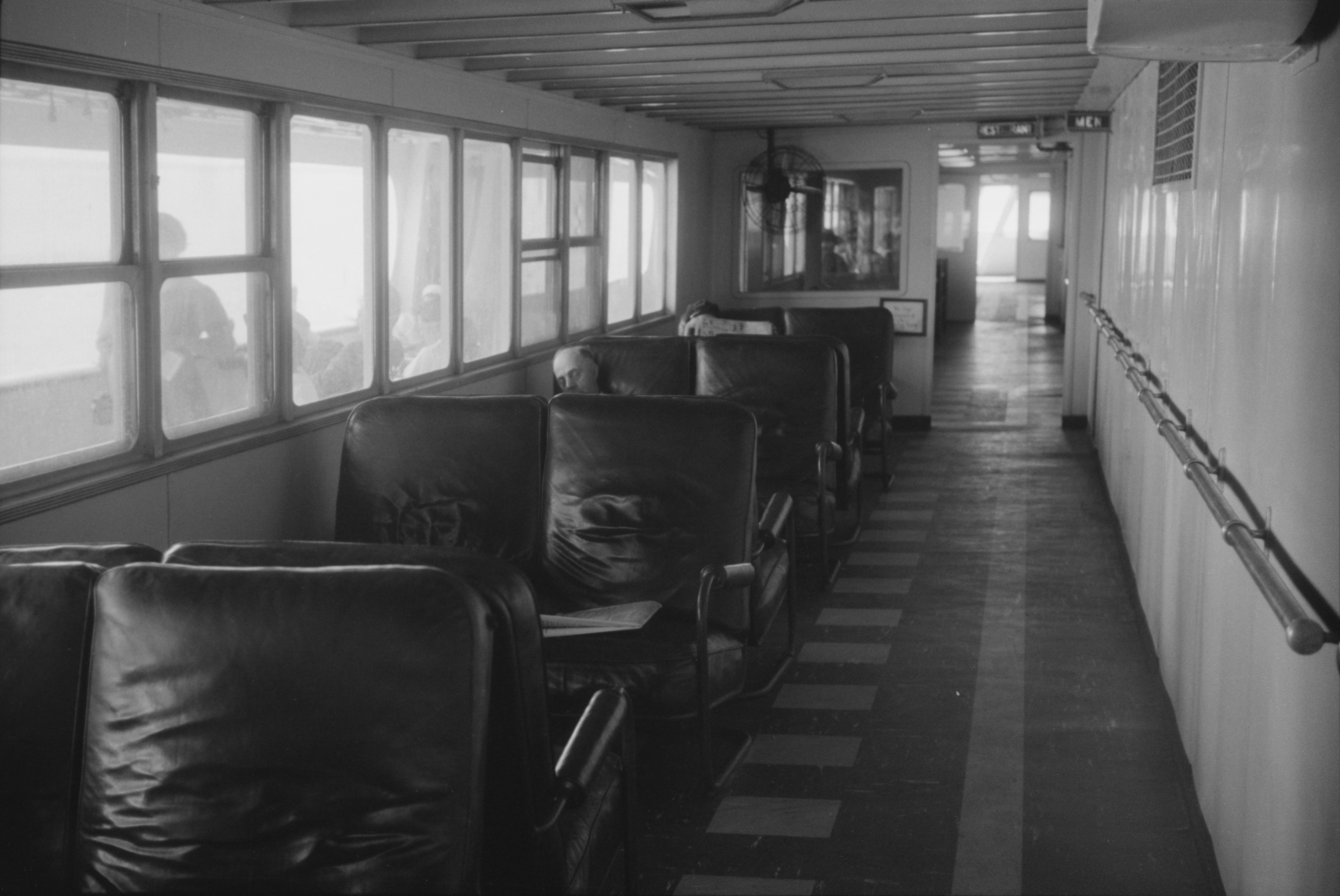
Interior view, 1940

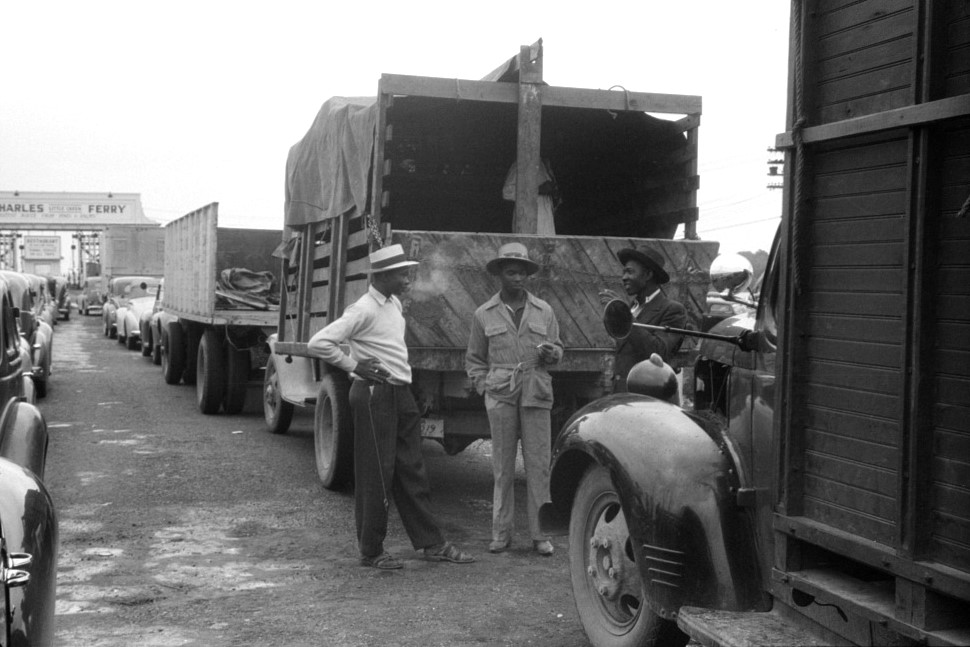
Migratory workers at the Norfolk end of the Norfolk-Cape Charles ferry on their way to pick potatoes and onions at Onley, Virginia (1940)

== See also ==
- MV Kalakala
