= C. Stowe Myers =

American industrial designer (1906–1995)

- C. Stowe Myers
- Born: Charles Stowe Myers; December 7, 1906; Altoona, Pennsylvania
- Died: August 6, 1995 (aged 88); New Orleans
- Occupation: Industrial designer
- Known for: Stowe Myers Industrial Design

Charles Stowe Myers (December 7, 1906 – August 6, 1995) was an American industrial designer.

== Early life and family ==
Charles Stowe Myers was born in Altoona, Pennsylvania, in 1906. He received his advanced education at the University of Pennsylvania from where he graduated with a degree in architecture in 1929 or 1930.

He married Harriet Bland Myers (1913–70).

== Career ==
Myers' first job was with pioneer of industrial design Norman Bel Geddes. One of his tasks there was to create the illustrations for the transportation designs in Geddes' book Horizons (1932). He then moved to the west coast of America and subsequently to Evanston, Illinois, where he opened his own firm, Stowe Myers Industrial Design.

He designed the American pavilions and displays for international trade fairs in Casablanca, Tripoli and Tunis as well as the exhibit for the 200th anniversary of Encyclopaedia Britannica at the Smithsonian Institution in 1968.

== Later life ==
Myers retired in 1976 in order to paint. He was named an official artist of the United States Air Force in 1978. He was resident in New Orleans from 1988 and died there at the Ellen Smith Hospital on 6 August 1995 following a stroke. His grave is at West Laurel Hill Cemetery, Bala Cynwyd, Pennsylvania. A selection of his papers is held at Syracuse University.
