= MV Kalakala =

Former ferry used on Puget Sound

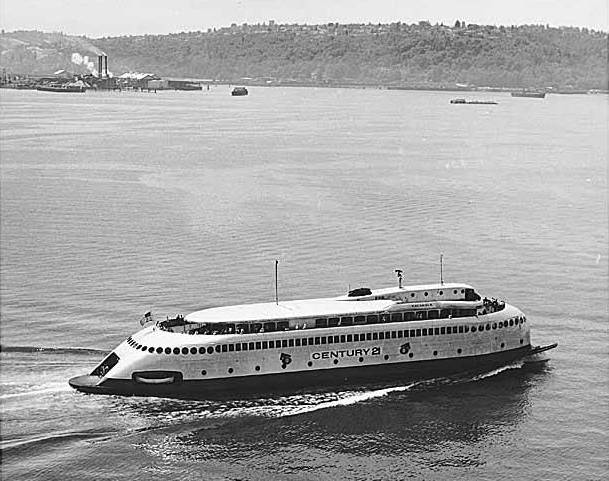
- MV Kalakala, pictured in Elliott Bay promoting the Century 21 Exposition/Seattle World's Fair (1962)

History
- Name: Peralta
- Owner: Key System
- Builder: Moore Dry Dock Company
- Yard number: 170
- Launched: 1926
- In service: 1926
- Out of service: 1933
- Fate: Severely damaged by fire, later restored
- Name: Kalakala
- Owner: Puget Sound Navigation Company
- Launched: 1935
- In service: 1935
- Out of service: 1967
- Fate: Scrapped in February 2015

General characteristics
- Displacement: 1,475 tons (light)
- Length: 276 ft (84 m)
- Beam: 55 ft 8 in (16.97 m)
- Depth: 21 ft 6 in (6.55 m)
- Installed power: Busch-Sulzer direct drive diesel engine 3,000 hp (2,200 kW)
- Propulsion: 10 cylinder engine, single screw
- Speed: 17.5 knots (32.4 km/h; 20.1 mph) (max)
- MV Kalakala (ferry)
- U.S. National Register of Historic Places
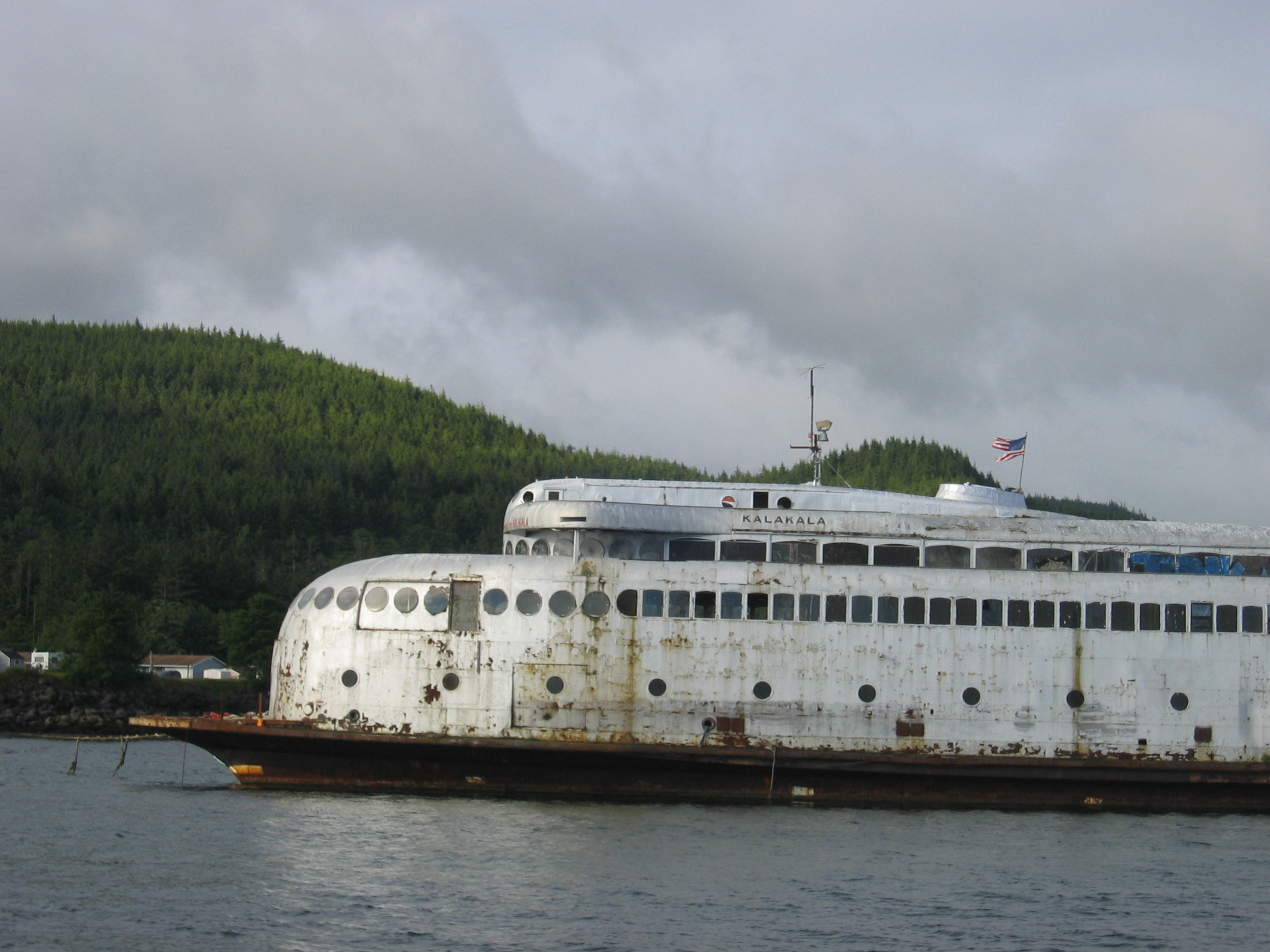
- Port side view of Kalakala as seen in Neah Bay in 2004
- Built: 1926
- NRHP reference No.: 06000177
- Added to NRHP: March 22, 2006

Motor Vessel Kalakala (pronounced /kəˈlɑːkəˌlɑː/) was a ferry that operated on Puget Sound from 1935 until her retirement in 1967.

MV Kalakala was notable for her unique streamlined superstructure, art deco styling, and luxurious amenities. The vessel was a popular attraction for locals and tourists, and was voted second only to the Space Needle in popularity among visitors to Seattle during the 1962 Seattle World's Fair. The ship is known as the world's first streamlined vessel for her unique art deco styling.

After retiring from passenger service in 1967, the ship was beached in Kodiak, Alaska, and converted to a shrimp cannery. In 1998, the ship was refloated and towed to Puget Sound with the owner hoping to restore the ship. During this time, the ship continued to deteriorate, with the Coast Guard declaring the ship a hazard to navigation in 2011. Unable to raise the funds required for restoration, the ship was scrapped in 2015.

== Service ==
=== Peralta ===
She was constructed for the Key System's commuter ferry service on San Francisco Bay between Oakland and San Francisco and named Peralta in honor of one of the area's early Spanish founding families. Launched in April 1926 she was of double ended design and was powered by a steam-turbo-electric power plant.

On February 17, 1928, while docking in Oakland, Peralta's bow sank into the water, sending waves sweeping over the deck. Five passengers were killed. The main cause of the accident was found to be the failure in properly filling ballast tanks at the rear of the ship with water to counterbalance the weight of the passengers moving en masse to the bow to disembark.

On the evening of May 6, 1933, while moored at the Oakland ferry terminal an arson fire started in the adjacent train sheds at 11 pm and spread to the Peralta whose superstructure collapsed due to the intense heat and she was written off by her insurance company.

=== Rebuilding ===
The still intact hull of the Peralta caught the eye of Alexander Peabody, president of the Puget Sound Navigation Company (PSNC), also known by its marketing name, the "Black Ball Line". He made an offer and on October 12, 1933, the vessel was sold to the PSNC, who had the hull towed by the tug Creole to Lake Washington Shipyards in Houghton, Washington (since annexed to Kirkland) to restore the vessel as a ferry. Over the next two years she was rebuilt. The remains of the superstructure and machinery were removed, while the beam was reduced from 68 ft to 55 ft 8 inches.

Only a single diesel engine was installed as it was intended that she would operate as a single-ender operating between Seattle and Bremerton. As the route was long, speed was considered to be important, as well as the ability to carry both passengers and motor vehicles. After his wife suggested that the new design should be distinctive and modernistic, Peabody decided to incorporate streamlining in the new superstructure. Louis Proctor, an engineer for the Boeing Company, provided an early concept design. The setback of the wheelhouse mimicked the setback of a cockpit behind the nose of an airplane. The flying bridge had no functional purpose but was evocative of wings, fitting with the aircraft-themed design. She was also given a modernistic art-deco interior with a full-service galley, a ladies' lounge, and a men's bar on the lower deck and showers for dockyard workers travelling home from the naval shipyard at Bremerton.

The new electro-welding, or arc-welding, process was used instead of rivet construction, lending a seamless appearance to fit with the streamlined design. Kalakala was the first vessel on which the new technique was used. The new bridge and wheelhouse were built entirely out of copper, from fear that the steel used in the rest of the vessel would interfere with the ship's compass.

In November 1934, William O. Thorniley, publicist for PSNC and president of the Olympic Peninsula Travel Association, named the new ferry Kalakala, which means "bird" in Chinook Jargon, a regional trade language. Thorniley launched a national promotional campaign beginning with large billboard signs that simply said "KALAKALA!" Later, they said "KALAKALA, Seattle, WA" and featured a picture of the vessel as well. The name established a tradition of all vessels in the ferry fleet of the Washington State Department of Transportation (which acquired ownership of the Kalakala in 1951) bearing indigenous names.

=== Service ===
After festivities, Kalakala entered service on July 4, 1935, becoming famous. In addition to ferry service, she was used for "moonlight cruises" with a live dance orchestra.

Kalakala saw heavy service during World War II transporting shipyard workers and Navy personnel between Seattle and Bremerton on an extended schedule. Vandalism and rowdiness brought deployment of the Shore Patrol and closure of the bar. That service led to the moniker, "The Workhorse of Puget Sound."

The aircraft-inspired design of Kalakala sacrificed functionality. The setback of the wheelhouse made it impossible to see the bow of the vessel, leading to difficulties when docking. The streamlined wheelhouse's small size and round windows also made all round visibility difficult. The car deck was narrowed for the sake of form, sacrificing lane width. That led to a 40% drop in the number of vehicles that could be carried as American cars became wider in the postwar years, with a corresponding drop in economic efficiency, while making it difficult for passengers to squeeze between cars on their way to embarking and disembarking from the ferry. With the coming of the more efficient Evergreen State class boats in the mid-1950s, Kalakala became obsolete. The enclosed bow design did, however, make her suitable for open water routes such as the Port Angeles - Victoria run, where she served from 1955 to 1959.

Kalakala had a heavy shaking vibration that ran throughout the vessel when in operation. This was probably due to poor alignment of the engine during the 1930s rebuild. When the propeller was replaced with a new 5-bladed version in 1956, the vibration was reduced by 40%. Although the PSNC wished Kalakala to be known as the Silver Swan, she soon attracted other, less complimentary nicknames, including Silver Slug, Silver Beetle, Galloping Ghost of the Pacific Coast, and, among Seattle's Scandinavian community, Kackerlacka, which means "cockroach".

In February 1946, Kalakala was issued Federal Communications Commission (FCC) license #001 when she was fitted with the first commercial radar system.

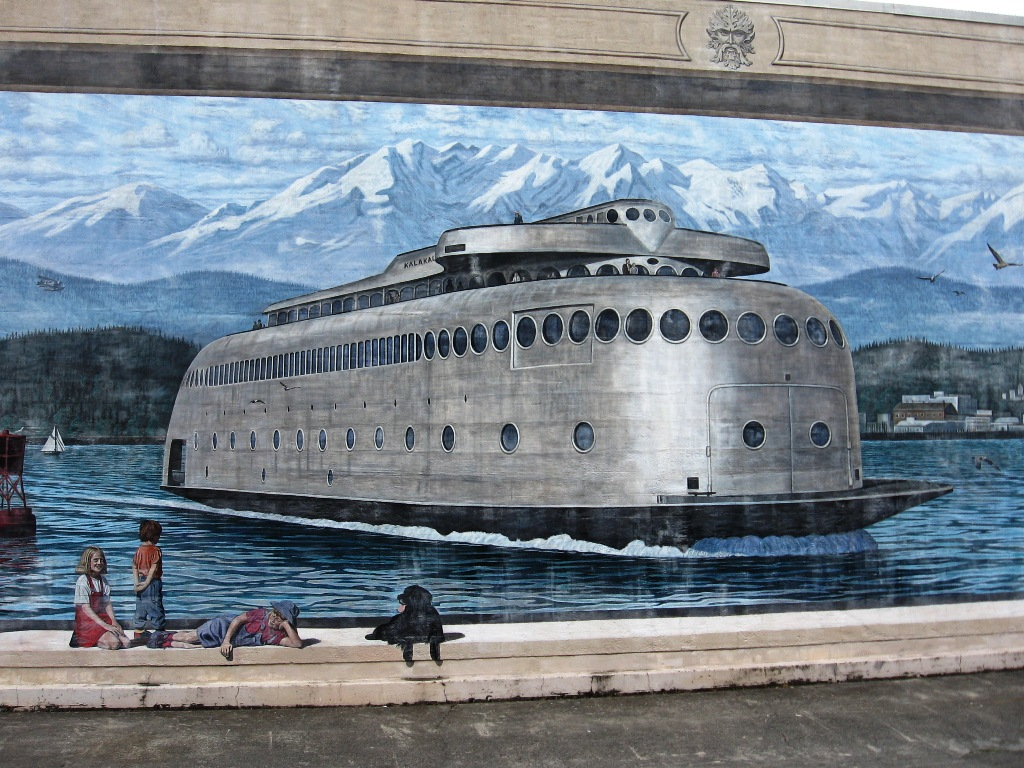
Kalakala mural painted in the town of Port Angeles, Washington.

Kalakala was featured transportation for tours of the Bremerton shipyards during the Seattle World's Fair in 1962.

== Retirement ==
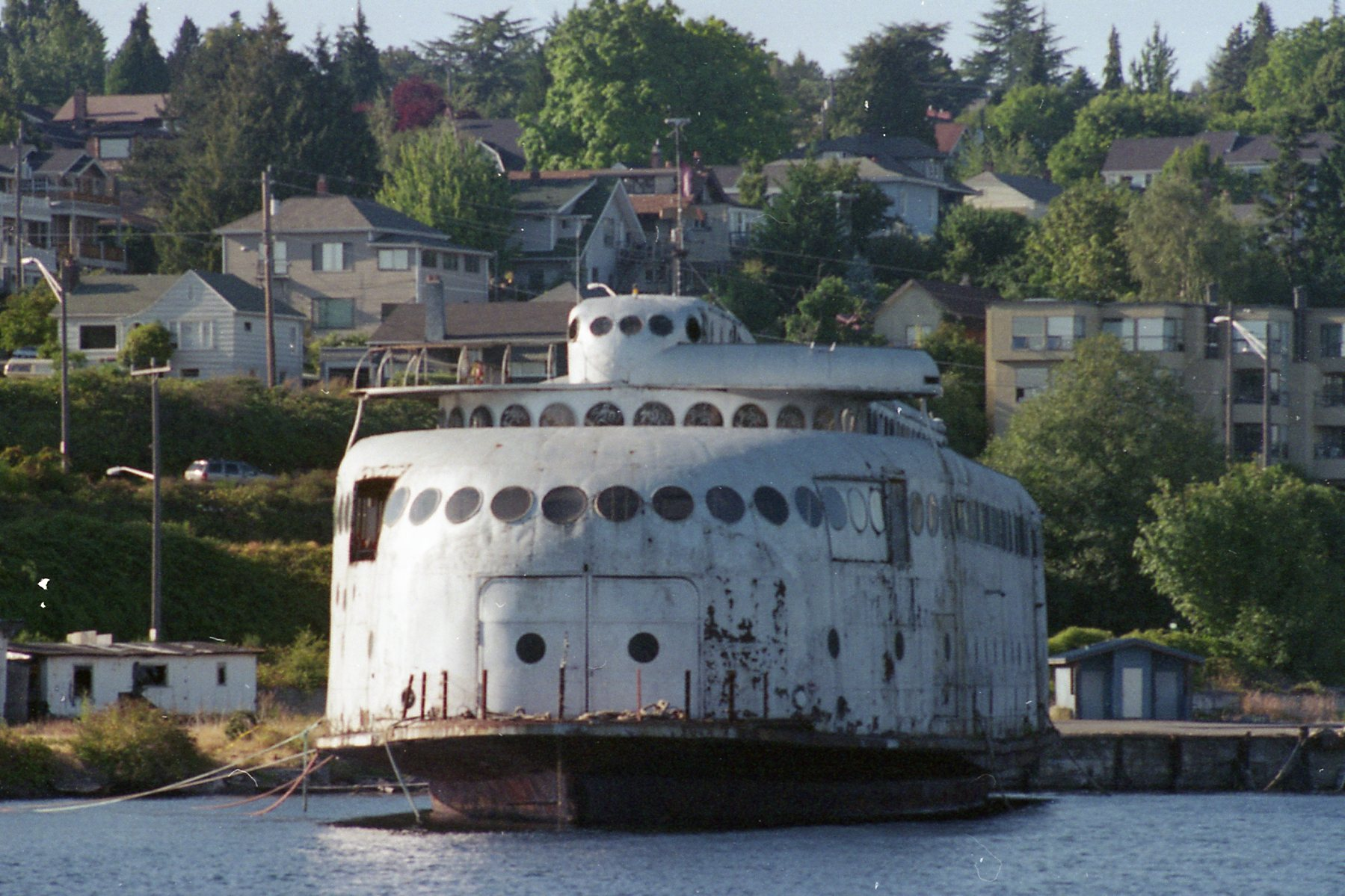
MV Kalakala in August 2003

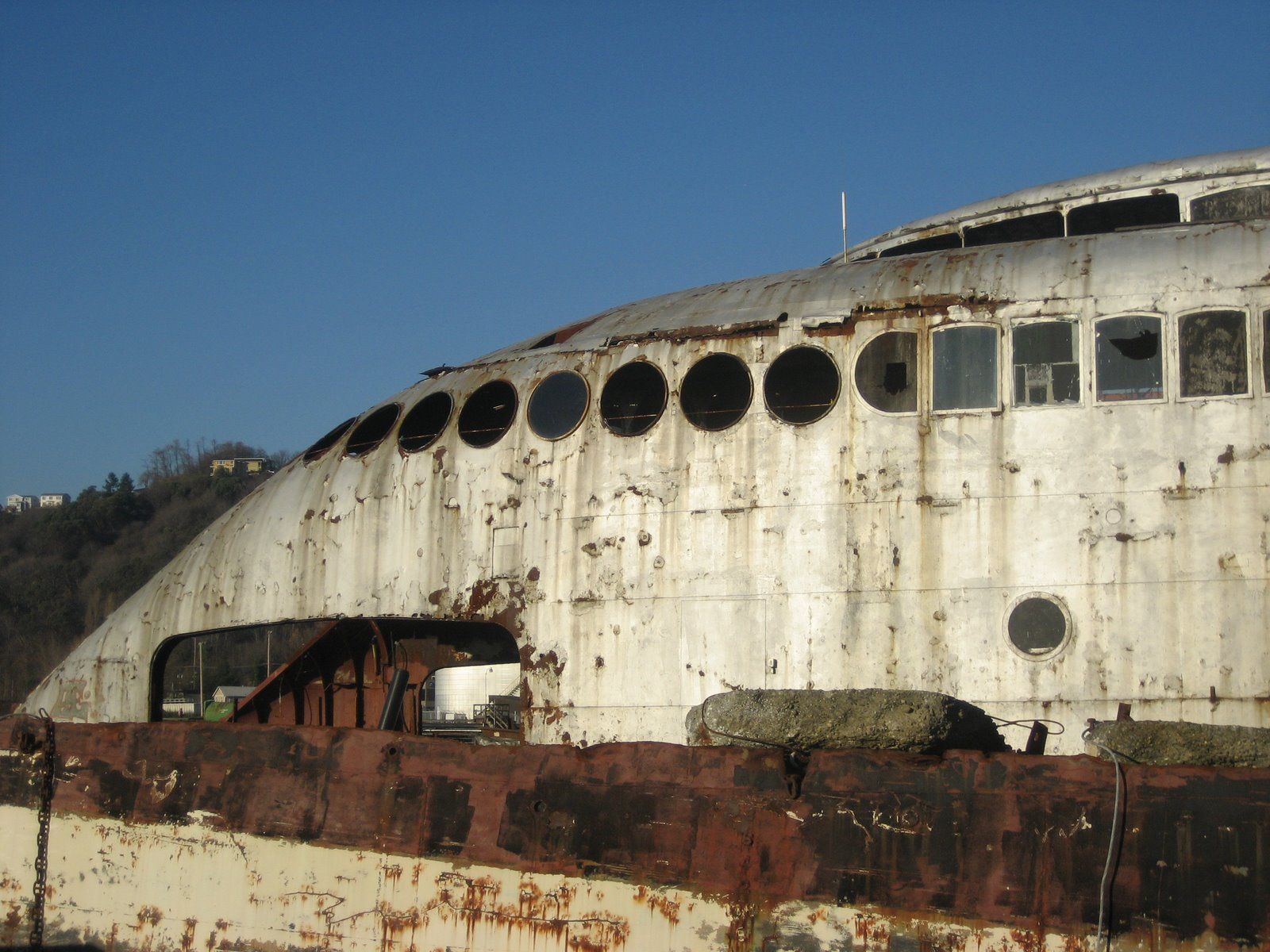
The Kalakala moored at Hylebos Waterway in Tacoma, Washington in November 2007

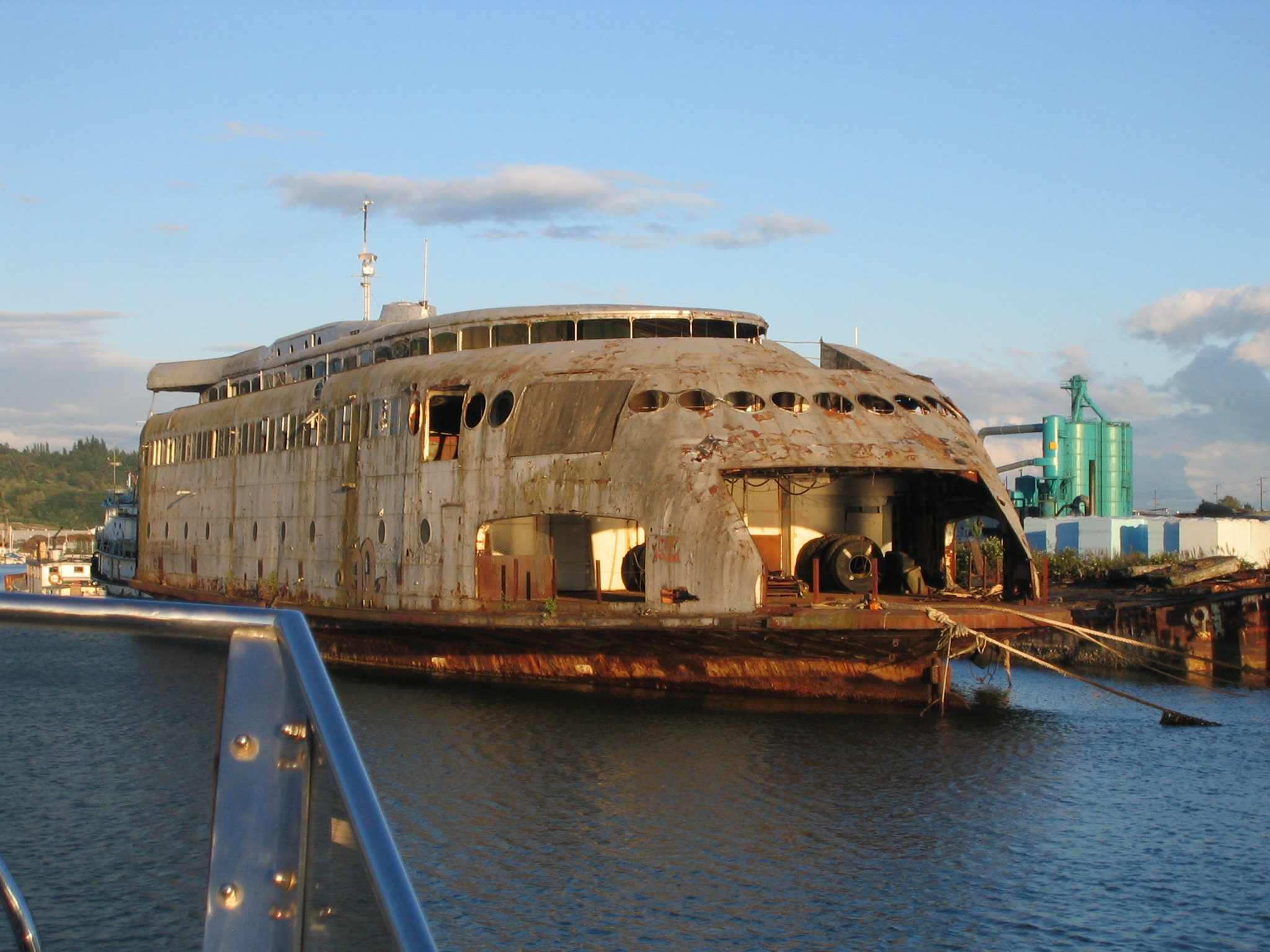
Wreck Kalakala

In 1967, Kalakala retired from service and moved to the Washington State Ferries repair facility at Eagle Harbor. A year later she was sold to a seafood processing company and towed to Alaska to work as a crab cannery at Ouzinkie, Alaska. Later the Kalakala was beached in Kodiak in 1970 and used to process shrimp.

Peter Bevis discovered the rusting hulk on a fishing trip in 1984. Kalakala was still operating as a cannery, with her internal structure having been reworked to create a building with cement floors, drywall, and ceiling tiles. After complicated financial negotiations, the ship was refloated and towed back to Seattle in 1998. The vessel became a source of controversy for the remainder of her existence as her owners were unable to raise sufficient funds to refurbish the vessel or even to keep her moored on Seattle's Lake Union.

The vessel was sold in 2004 to a private investor, who moved her to an anchorage in Neah Bay provided by the Makah people. Soon after arriving at Neah Bay Kalakala was evicted by the Makah, who also brought a lawsuit against the owners. The vessel was then relocated to Tacoma, Washington.

In February 2008, Kalakala owner Steve Rodrigues announced his intention to acquire additional vintage ferry vessels and to restore them and the Kalakala as either ferries powered by wind and solar technologies or as museums. Kalakala was scheduled for work on her hull and superstructure in dry dock in 2010, but this never happened. After six years in Tacoma, Kalakala began listing, and officials became concerned that the ferry might pose an environmental risk. The vessel's owner was also pressured to take action after Washington State passed a law focusing on the removal of abandoned or neglected vessels. For these reasons, Kalakala's owner put her up for sale for a nominal fee of one dollar, contingent on the purchaser committing to renovating Kalakala.

In December 2011, the Coast Guard declared the ship a hazard to navigation. Among other issues, the Coast Guard stated that her mooring arrangements were inadequate. The Coast Guard set a December 19 deadline for the owner to repair the hull of the ship and submit a plan to tow her away from her current mooring in Tacoma. This deadline was not met. The owner, Steve Rodrigues, appealed this order, claiming that an anonymous person had purchased the ship. The Coast Guard rejected the appeal as there was no evidence that any work had been done on the ship and no evidence of the supposed sale.

The Coast Guard described the ship as being in such fragile condition that it may not withstand being moved to other moorage and might have to be scrapped. In July 2012 Steve Rodrigues sued the state of Washington claiming that the state had failed in its "duty" to help preserve the ferry. Rodrigues' suit asked that the state be prevented from forcing Kalakala to be moved, confiscated, or sunk and sought to force the state to pay approximately $50 million for restoration of the ferry under a proposal Rodrigues previously submitted, which was rejected. In November 2012, Karl Anderson, owner of the Hylebos Waterway uplands where the boat was moored, took possession of the vessel in exchange for the $4,000 he claimed Rodrigues owed him in back rent.

== Dismantling ==
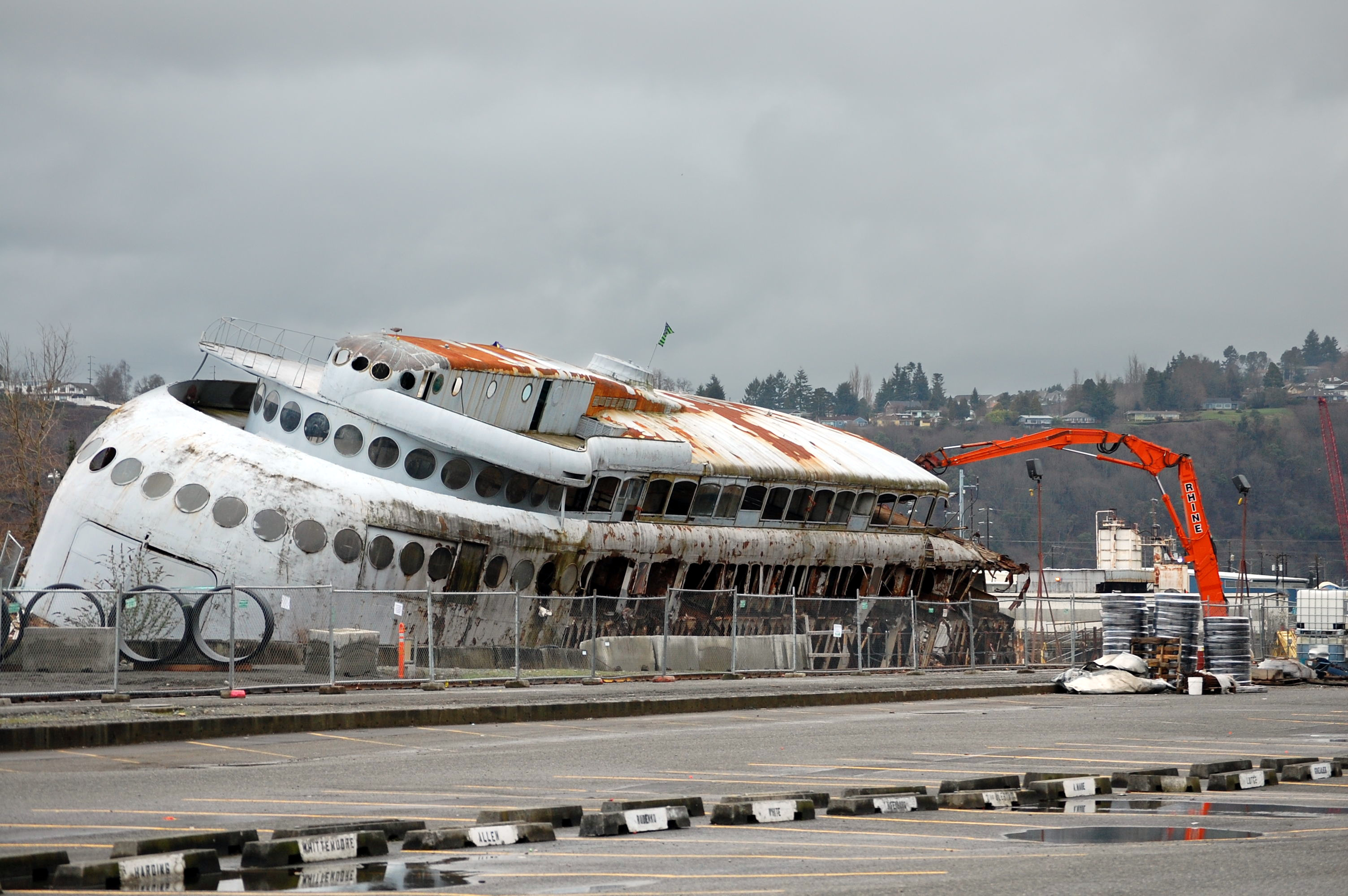
The Kalakala being scrapped in Tacoma, Washington on January 24, 2015

On January 4, 2015, owner Karl Anderson announced that the Kalakala would be dismantled for scrap metal. On January 22, the Kalakala was towed to a Tacoma dry dock and scrapping began immediately. By the first week of February scrapping was completed with only a few pieces such as windows, pilot house, and the rudder saved and sold as souvenirs.

== Artistic projects ==
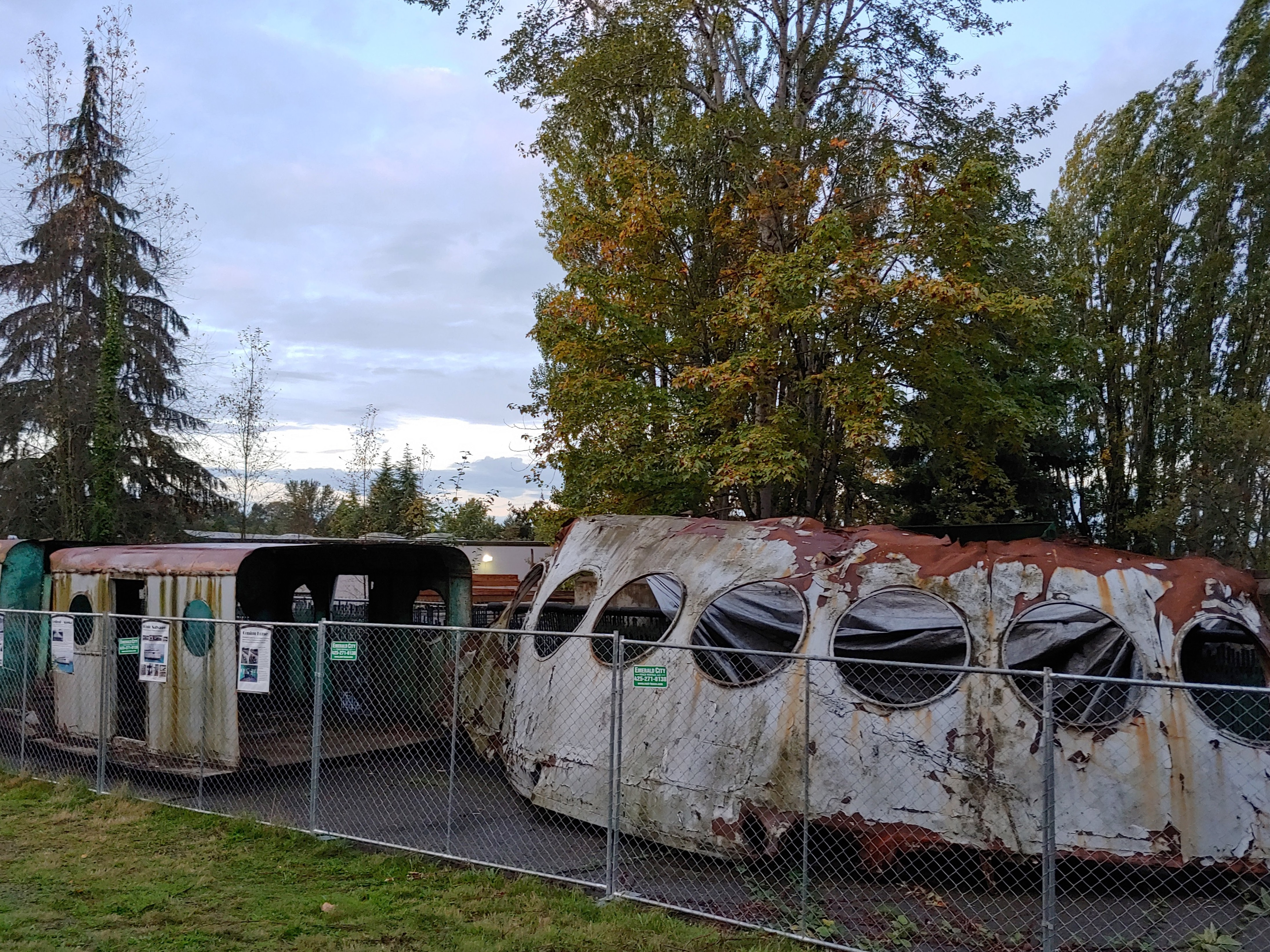
Parts of Kalakala's hull in storage in 2019, for a future Kirkland, Washington public art installation

Several art projects arose from fascination with Kalakala, including a full-length album of solo cello compositions recorded on board the vessel in November 2003, called Songs from a Parallel Universe. There is an as-yet unreleased film about the "Ghost Dance" that was filmed on Kalakala. There was also a live concert featuring the Icelandic band múm, Serena Tideman and Eyvind Kang, on board the Kalakala. The watercolorist Robert Tandecki painted her among her later days. Artist Cory Ench painted a large mural of Kalakala in downtown Port Angeles in 1995.

In 2002, it was home to the Undergraduate Degree Shows for Cornish College of the Arts Design Department.

A temporary pirate radio station broadcasting from Kalakala is featured in the 2005 documentary film Pirate Radio USA.

The city of Kirkland bought some of the scrapped pieces of Kalakala and, as of 2018, is considering using them in a public art project.Several pieces of the vessel were placed in the parking lot of Salty's on Alki in West Seattle, including a wheelhouse that faces Elliott Bay and the Seattle skyline.

Pieces of the bridge and the auxiliary engine's crankshaft are on display at the King Agriculture Museum in Centralia, Washington.

== See also ==
- SS Admiral
- SS Princess Anne
