= Bohn Aluminum and Brass Corporation =

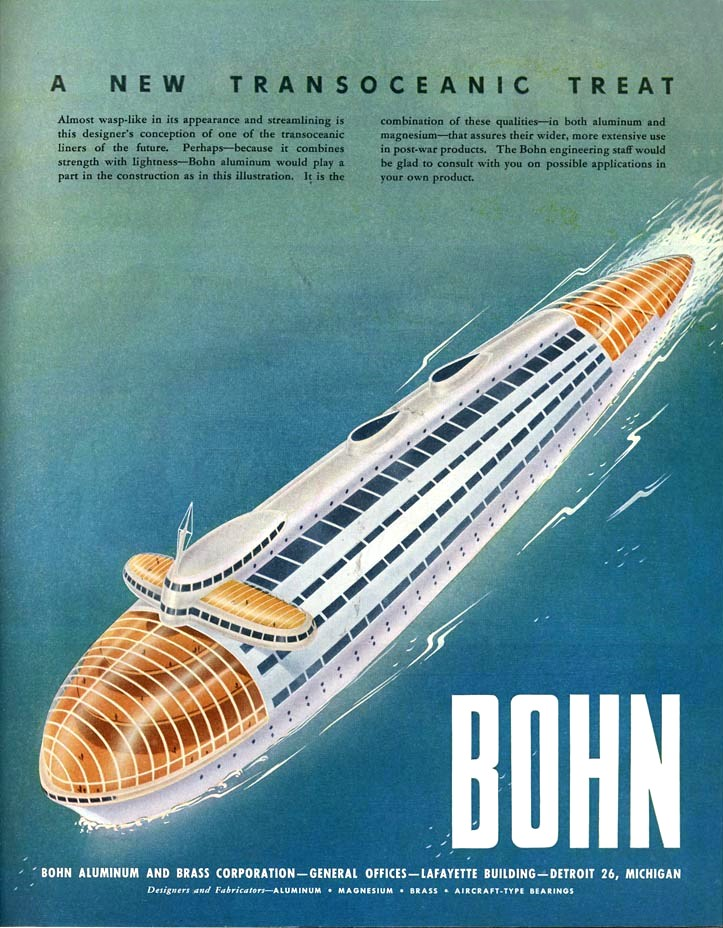
Characteristic futuristic Bohn advertisement showing a streamlined ocean liner. Metal Progress, 1946.

Bohn Aluminum and Brass Corporation was a manufacturing company based in Detroit, Michigan and formed in 1924 from the merger of the General Aluminium and Brass Company and the C.B. Bohn Foundry Company. It produced a series of notable advertisements depicting applications of its product in futuristic environments. It merged into Universal American Corporation in 1963. Universal American merged into Gulf and Western Industries in 1966. Gulf and Western later sold Bohn to the Wickes Companies. Wickes sold Bohn Aluminum and Brass to Norsk Hydro and its Heat Transfer Group division (which included Bohn Heat Transfer) to the Heatcraft subsidiary of Lennox International.

== External sources ==
- Imaging the Future, Arthur Radebaugh, Bohn Aluminium and Brass Corporation, advertisements
- Creepy anti-communist propaganda from Bohn Aluminum and Brass Corporation, 1952
