= Norman Bel Geddes =

American theatrical and industrial designer (1893–1958)

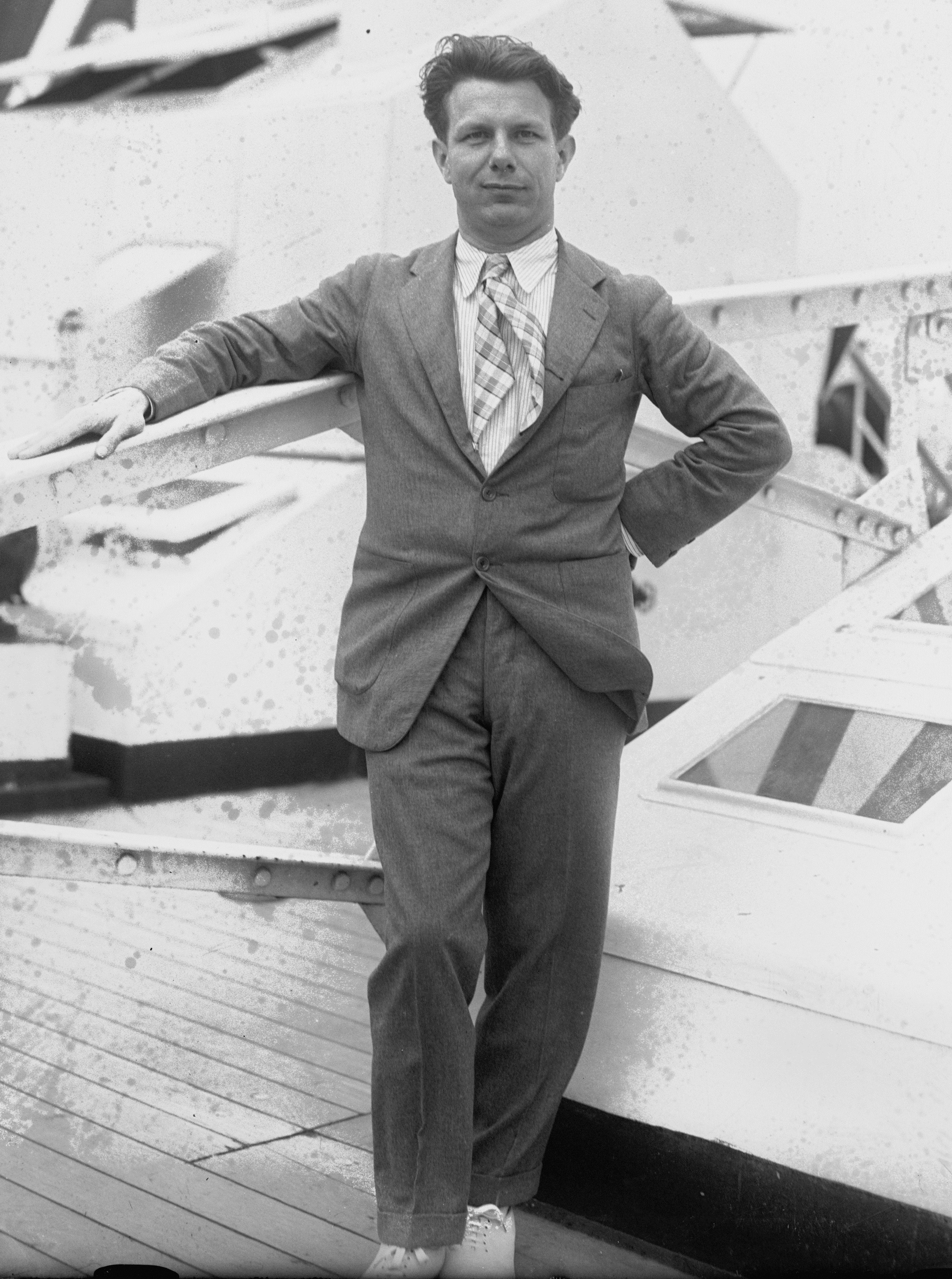
- Born: Norman Melancton Geddes; April 27, 1893; Adrian, Michigan, U.S.
- Died: May 8, 1958 (aged 65); New York City, U.S.
- Occupations: Theatrical designer Industrial designer
- Notable work: Airliner Number 4 Futurama; Mark I computer case
- Spouses: Helen Belle Schneider; Edith Lutyens
- Children: Barbara Bel Geddes; Joan Bel Geddes Ulanov

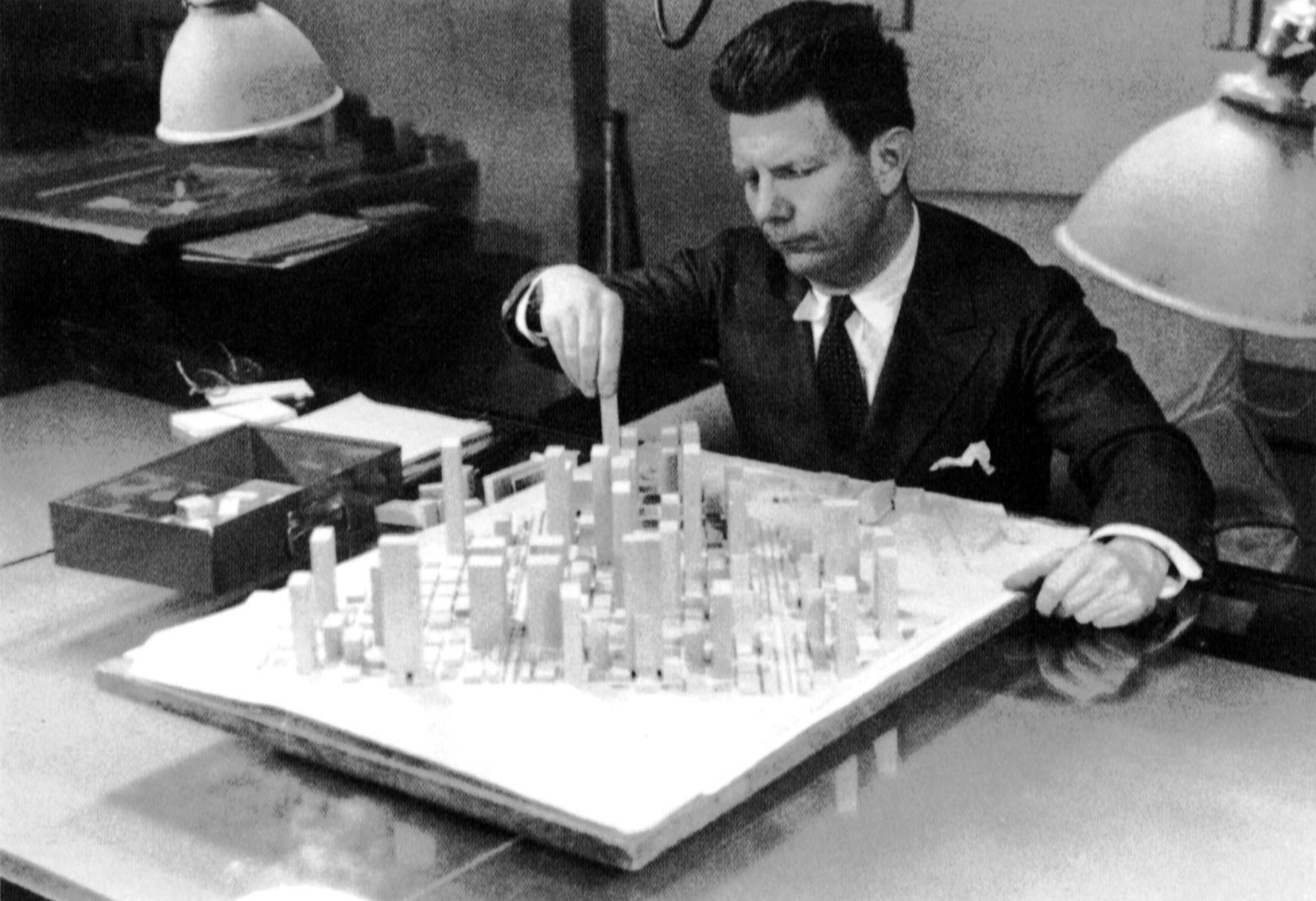
Norman Bel Geddes with part of the Shell Oil City of Tomorrow. Photo: Frances Resor Waite c. 1937.

Norman Bel Geddes (born Norman Melancton Geddes /ˈɡɛdiːz/; April 27, 1893 – May 8, 1958) was an American theatrical and industrial designer, described in 2012 by the New York Times as "a brilliant craftsman and draftsman, a master of style, the 20th century’s Leonardo da Vinci." As a young designer, Bel Geddes brought an innovative and energized perspective to the Broadway stage and New York’s Metropolitan Opera. In the 1930s he became one of the first to hold the title of Industrial Designer. His futuristic Streamline designs re-envisioned many of the utilitarian objects of the day from airplanes and ocean liners to cocktail shakers and circuses. He also conceived and oversaw construction of the Futurama Exhibition at the 1939 New York World's Fair.

== Early life ==
Bel Geddes was born Norman Melancton Geddes in Adrian, Michigan, and was raised in New Philadelphia, Ohio, the son of Flora Luelle (née Yingling) and Clifton Terry Geddes, a stockbroker. When he married Helen Belle Schneider in 1916, they combined their names to Bel Geddes. Their daughters were actress Barbara Bel Geddes and writer Joan Ulanov, wife of Barry Ulanov.

== Career ==
The insignia used by Bel Geddes in his published works

Bel Geddes began his career with set designs for Aline Barnsdall's Los Angeles Little Theater in the 1916–17 season, then in 1918 as the scene designer for the Metropolitan Opera in New York. He designed and directed various theatrical works, from Arabesque and The Five O'Clock Girl on Broadway to an ice show, It Happened on Ice, produced by Sonja Henie. He also created set designs for the film Feet of Clay (1924), directed by Cecil B. DeMille, designed costumes for Max Reinhardt, and created the sets for the Broadway production of Sidney Kingsley's Dead End (1935).

Bel Geddes opened an industrial-design studio in 1927, and designed a wide range of commercial products, from cocktail shakers to commemorative medallions to radio cabinets. His designs extended to unrealized futuristic concepts: a teardrop-shaped automobile, and an Art Deco House of Tomorrow. In 1929, he designed "Airliner Number 4," a 9-deck amphibian airliner that incorporated areas for deck-games, an orchestra, a gymnasium, a solarium, and two airplane hangars.

His book Horizons (1932) had a significant impact: "By popularizing streamlining when only a few engineers were considering its functional use, he made possible the design style of the thirties." Bel Geddes was highly inspired by organic forms, like the bodies of birds and fish, which he saw as naturally 'streamlined' and thus the perfect model for replication in industrial design. Bel Geddes was thus very interested in eugenics and the potentials for the 'streamlining' of biological organisms, including humans. According to Garth Huxtable, one of Bel Geddes's former employees, Bel Geddes often brought up sex and reproduction in casual conversation; Bel Geddes's library was filled with many of the most popular books on eugenics at the time, like The Basics of Breeding by veterinarian and member of the American Eugenics Society, Leon F. Whitney. He would often contribute articles to popular American periodicals concerned with the future of design and human society.

In the classic science fiction film of H. G. Wells' Things to Come (1936), he assisted production designer William Cameron Menzies on the look of the world of tomorrow.

Bel Geddes designed the General Motors Pavilion, known as Futurama, for the 1939 New York World's Fair. For inspiration, Bel Geddes exploited his earlier work in the same vein: he had designed a "Metropolis City of 1960" in 1936. The building, described by Lewis Mumford as "the great egg out of which civilization is to be born," has been interpreted by historians as potentially promoting subconscious themes of sex and reproduction, in which the feminine was the passive tool with which the masculine used to birth his new world.

The case for the Mark I computer was designed by Bel Geddes at IBM's expense, and put in place just in time for the machine's dedication at Harvard University.

== Death and legacy ==
Bel Geddes died in New York on May 8, 1958. His autobiography, Miracle in the Evening, was published posthumously in 1960.

Bel Geddes is a member of the American Theater Hall of Fame, a distinction he shares with his daughter, actress Barbara Bel Geddes. The United States Postal Service issued a postage stamp honoring Bel Geddes as a "Pioneer Of American Industrial Design".

The archive of Norman Bel Geddes is held by the Harry Ransom Center at the University of Texas at Austin. This large collection includes models, drafts, watercolor designs, research notes, project proposals, and correspondence. The Ransom Center also holds the papers of Bel Geddes' second wife, the costume designer and producer Edith Lutyens Bel Geddes.

== Gallery ==
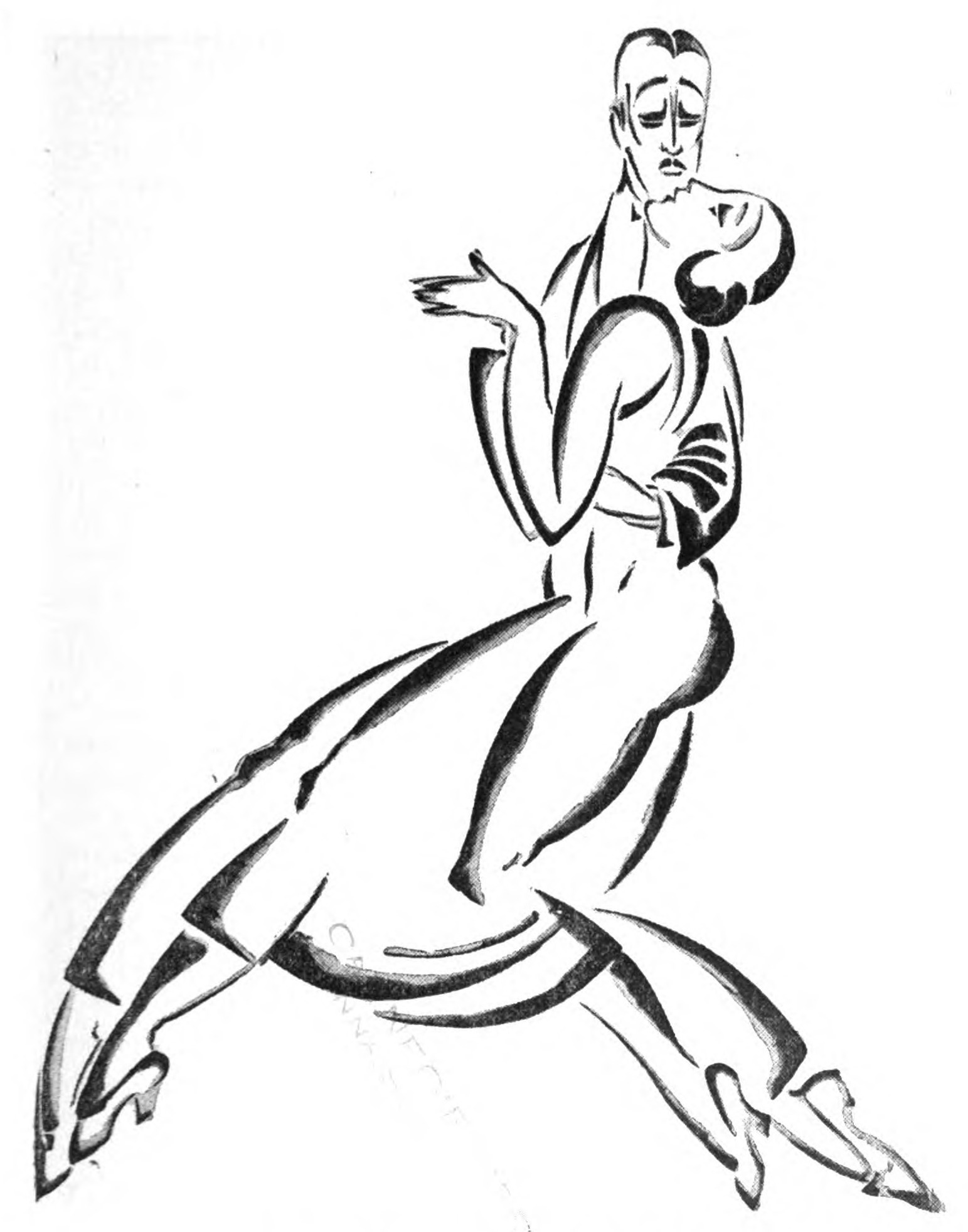
A drawing by Norman Bel Geddes

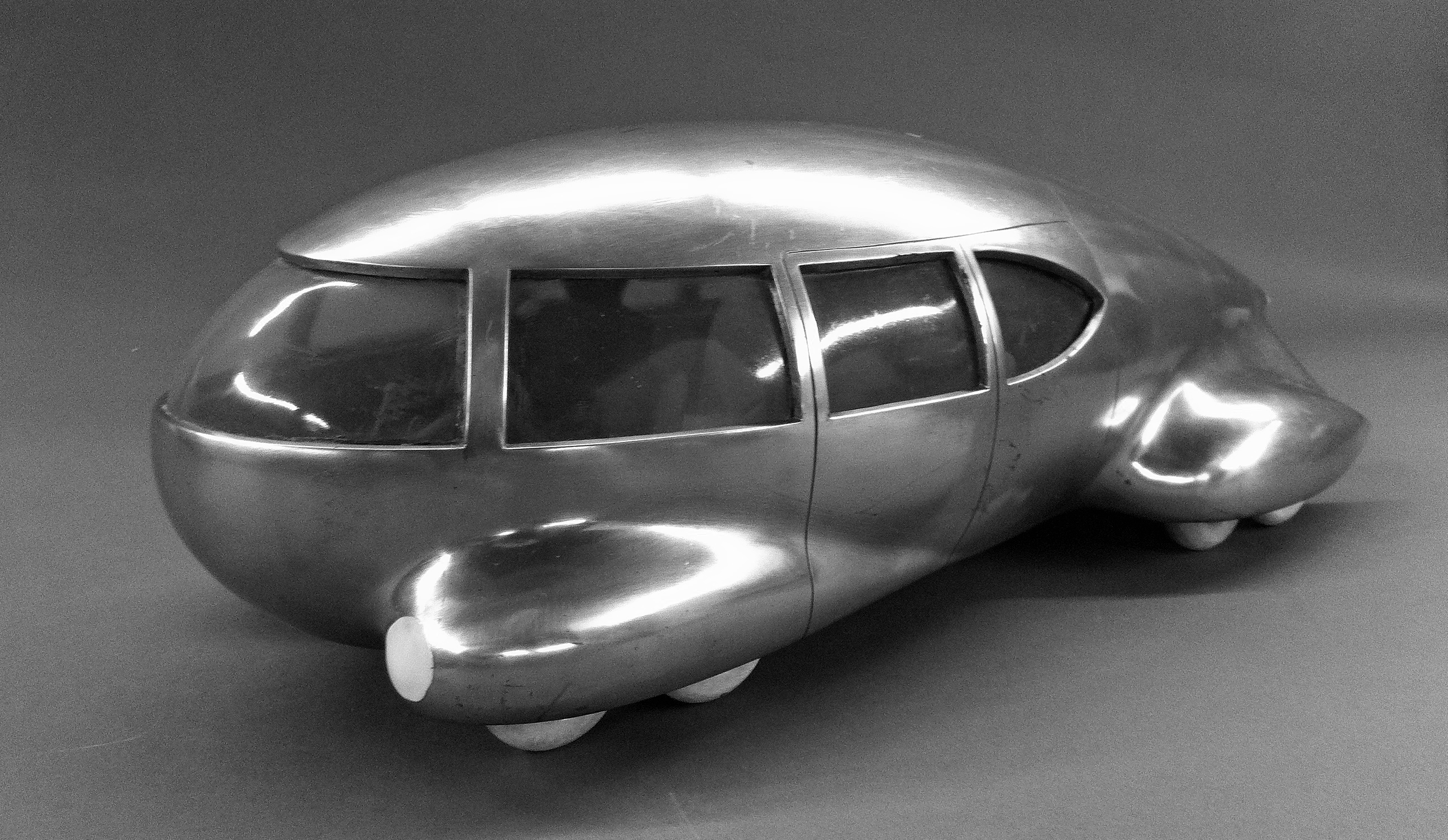
Model of teardrop-shaped automobile designed by Bel Geddes

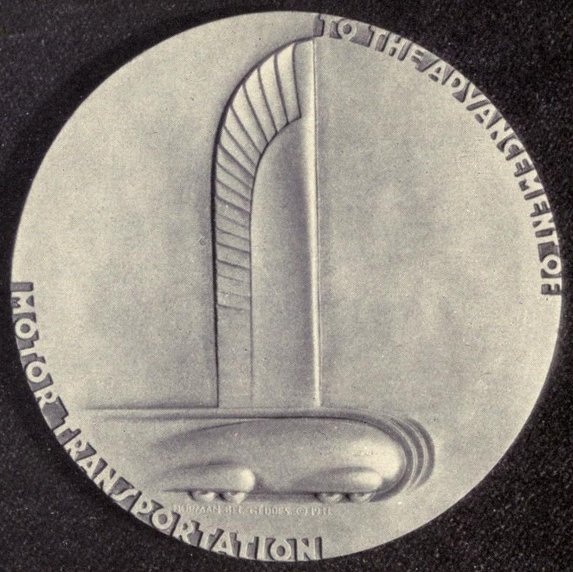
General Motors 25th anniversary medal, 1933, featuring teardrop shaped car

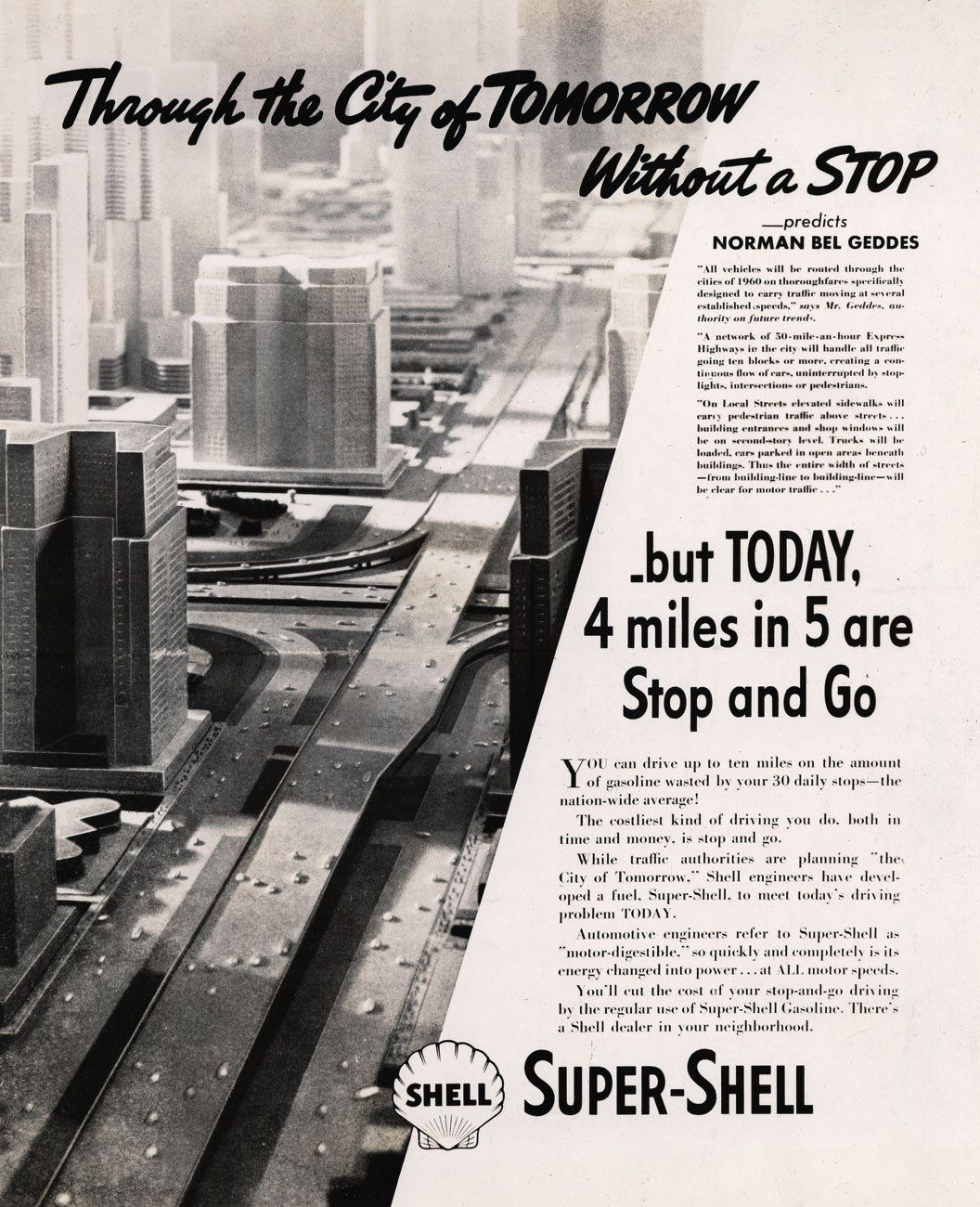
"Through the City of Tomorrow Without a Stop", Shell Oil advertisement, 1937.

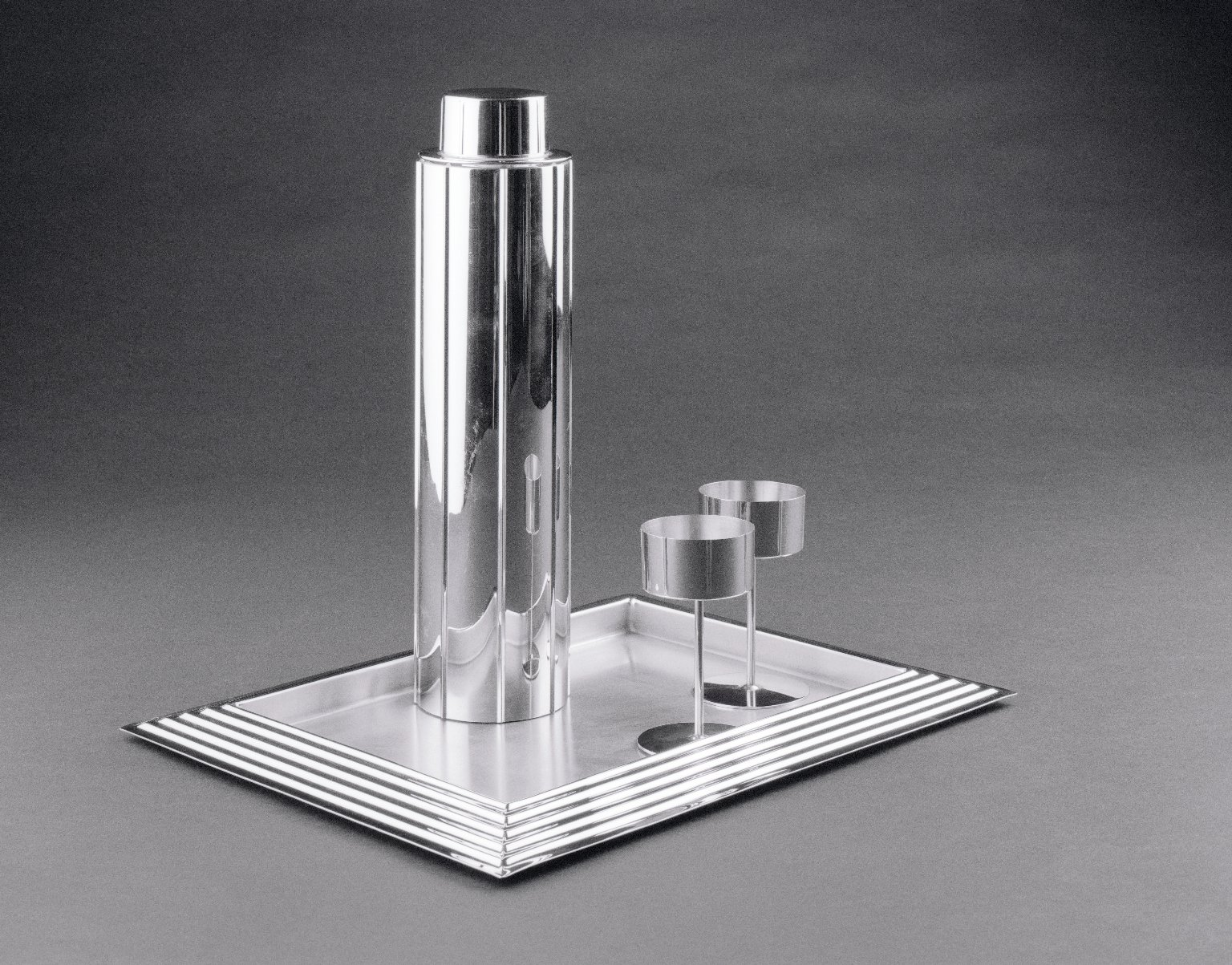
Norman Bel Geddes. Cocktail Set. 1937. Brooklyn Museum

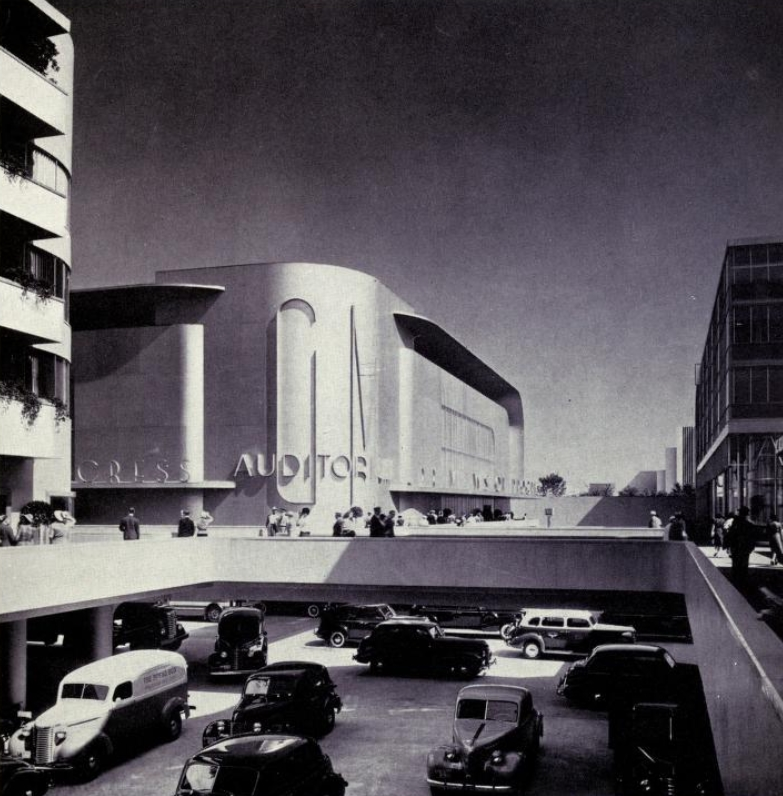
A full scale street intersection in the City of the Future at the Futurama exhibit at the 1939 New York World's Fair

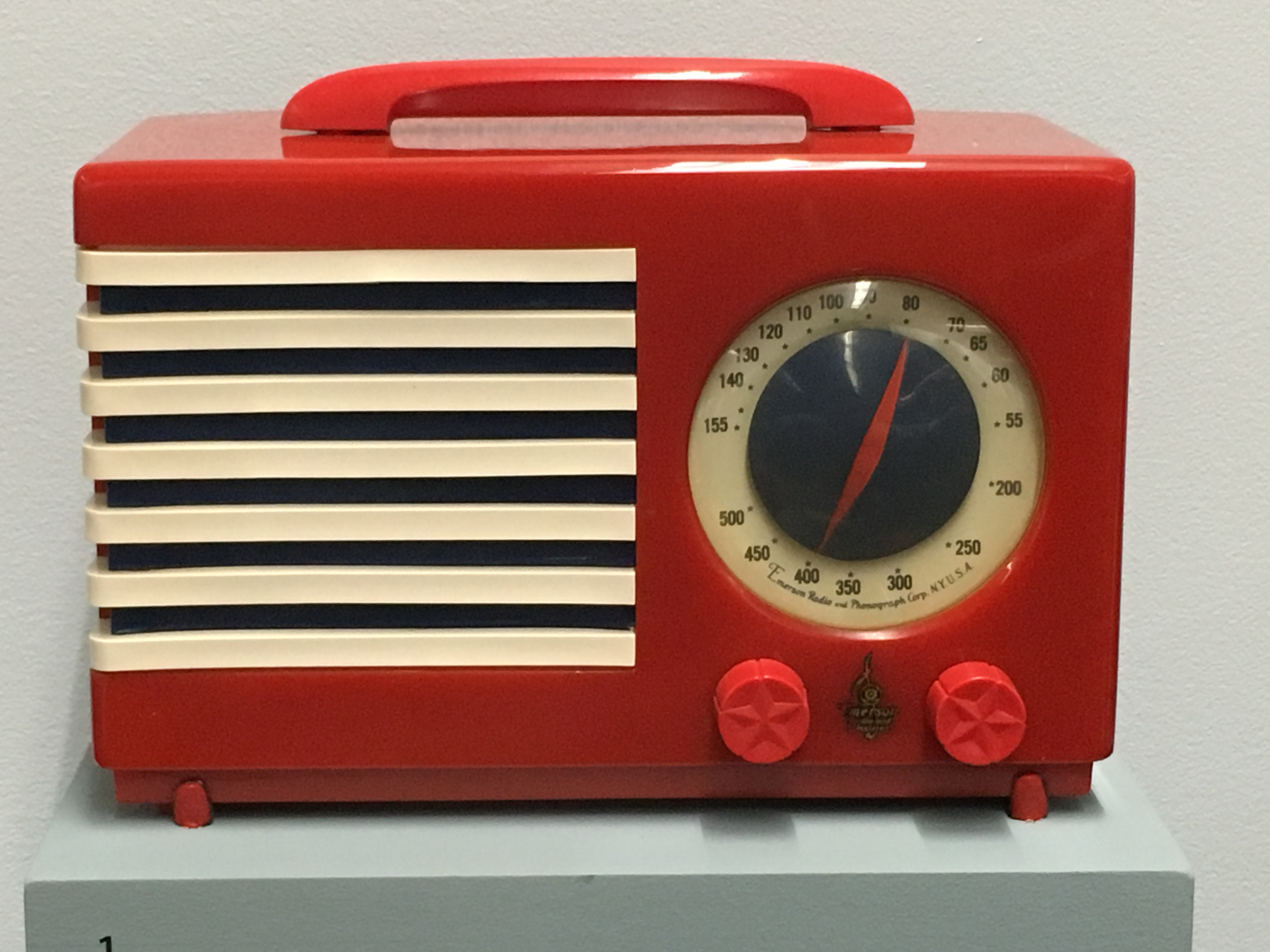
Emerson Model 400-3 "Patriot" radio designed by Bel Geddes, made of Catalin (1940). The design is featured on a 2011 Pioneers of American Industrial Design US postage stamp.

== Selected publications ==
- Horizons Little Brown, Boston, 1932.
- "Streamlining", Atlantic Monthly, No. 154 (November 1934), pp. 553–558.
- Magic Motorways. Random House, New York, 1940.
- Miracle in the Evening: An Autobiography. Doubleday, New York, 1960. Edited by William Kelley.

== See also ==
- Raymond Loewy – French-born American industrial designer
- Joseph Claude Sinel – New Zealand-born American industrial designer
- Texaco Doodlebug
