= Helene Pons =

Russian-born American costume designer (1898–1990)

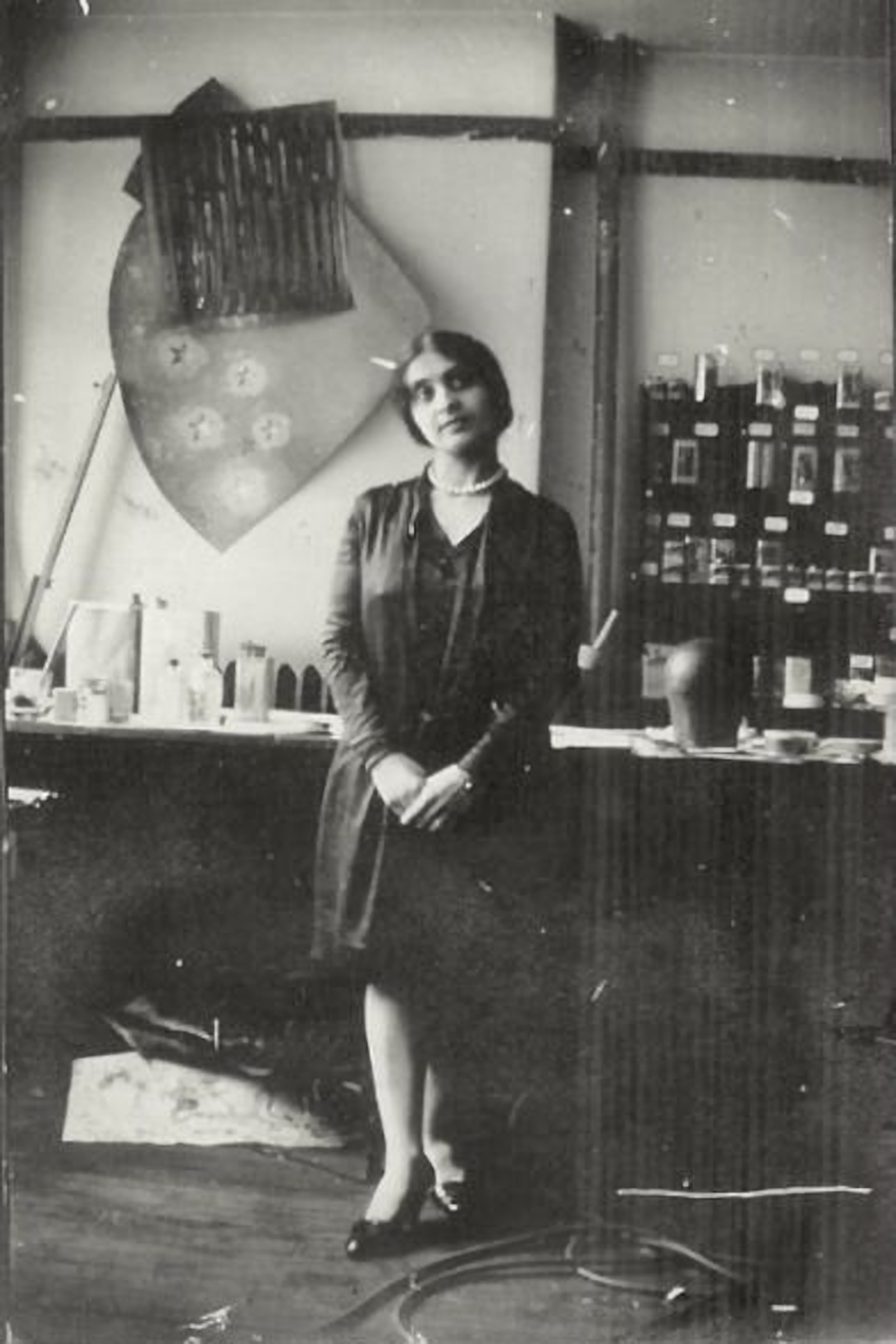
- Helene Pons, in c. 1920
- Born: Helene Christoforovna Wermicheff; April 30, 1898; Tiflis, Russian Empire
- Died: April 19, 1990 (aged 91); Rome, Italy
- Occupation: Costume designer
- Organizations: Broadway theatres; Metropolitan Opera; American Ballet Theatre; New York City Ballet

Helene Christoforovna Wermicheff, known by her married name Helene Pons, (April 30, 1898 – April 19, 1990) was a Russian-born American costume and fashion designer. With her husband, George Pons, she co-founded the George & Helene Pons studio in New York in 1924. The studio created costumes for more than 100 Broadway productions from 1924 through 1965, including costumes for the original productions of Our Town (1938), Pal Joey (1940), Kiss Me, Kate (1948), My Fair Lady (1956), Camelot (1960), and Sail Away (1961). In 1956 she was nominated for the Tony Award for Best Costume Design at the 10th Tony Awards for her designs for three 1955 plays: The Diary of Anne Frank, A View from the Bridge, and The Heavenly Twins. In addition to designing for Broadway, Pons also designed and/or made costumes for production staged by the Metropolitan Opera, the American Ballet Theatre, and the New York City Ballet. She was also the author of the children's book The Story of Vanya (1963) and occasionally designed ready-to-wear clothing for American department stores.

== Early life, education, and marriage ==
Helene Wermicheff was born on April 30, 1898, in Tiflis, Russian Empire in what is today Tbilisi, Georgia. Her mother, Varva, was a pianist who had trained under a teacher that had studied with Ludwig van Beethoven. Her father, Christofor Avaloumovitch Wermicheff, was an aristocrat, writer, and journalist who studied with Leo Tolstoy and worked as a newspaper publisher. He was elected mayor of Tiflis in 1904. Christofor sent his wife and daughter to Switzerland just prior to the outbreak of the Russian Revolution of 1905.

Helene was educated in Switzerland and an art school in Paris; arriving in France in 1920. While studying in Paris she met her future husband George Pons who was then technical director of La Chauve-Souris, a Parisian theatre company made up of Russian expats. Helene got a job with La Chauve-Souris as a doll maker and traveled with the company on their 1921 tour of England. On November 8, 1921, Helene and George married in London. She subsequently adopted his name professionally.

== Early career in the United States ==
Pons and her husband immigrated to the United States; arriving in the US from England via the SS Lapland on January 31, 1922. She later became a naturalized American citizen in 1933. She and her husband established the George & Helene Pons Studio (GHPS, often shortened to Helene Pons Studio) in New York City which fabricated both original designs by Helene and costumes designed by other artists. GHPS specialized in made-to-order costumes; making from scratch garments that were often labour intensive and unique. They would sometimes be brought into a production that was largely designed by someone else to design or make highly specific and unusual costumes that lay outside of the skillset of the primary designer. Helene was also the primary costume designer for many Broadway shows, and was a member of the Theatrical Costumers Association.

GHPS was initially just a two person business with Helene and George as the sole employees working out of their apartment in New York City. It was located at 112 W. 44th Street. The couple's first project was designing for Henry Dreyfuss's Presentations which opened at Broadway's Strand Theatre in 1924 and ran for three years. Other early work on Broadway included designing costumes for Thornton Wilder's The Trumpet Shall Sound (1926) and A. A. Milne's The Ivory Door (1927). Outside of Broadway, Helene designed costumes for Mikhail Mordkin's Russian ballet company for their 1927 tour, and designed costumes for 1927 short films made by the Boston company Colorart Pictures. In 1930 costumes she had made for the Metropolitan Opera were repurposed for a production of Edna St. Vincent Millay's The Princess Marries the Page in Philadelphia with a cast that included composers Samuel Barber and Gian Carlo Menotti as soldiers.

In 1931 Pons patented the first commercial underwire bra; a technique that came from her originating methods of strapless boning and foundation for costumes. This design incorporated an open ended wire loop and is still used by the fashion industry in the 21st century. In the 1930s she designed costumes for the Broadway productions of Second Little Show (1930), Hey Nonny Nonny! (1932), The Mad Hopes (1932), The Lady from the Sea (1934), Revenge with Music (1934), Mansion on the Hudson (1935), The Golden Journey (1936), A Doll's House (1937), Babes in Arms (1937), Brown Sugar (1937), Edna His Wife (1937), Our Town (1938), and The Primrose Path (1939) among others. For the 1939 New York World's Fair she designed costumes for Kurt Weill and Edward Hungerford's musical Railroads on Parade.

== Later career ==
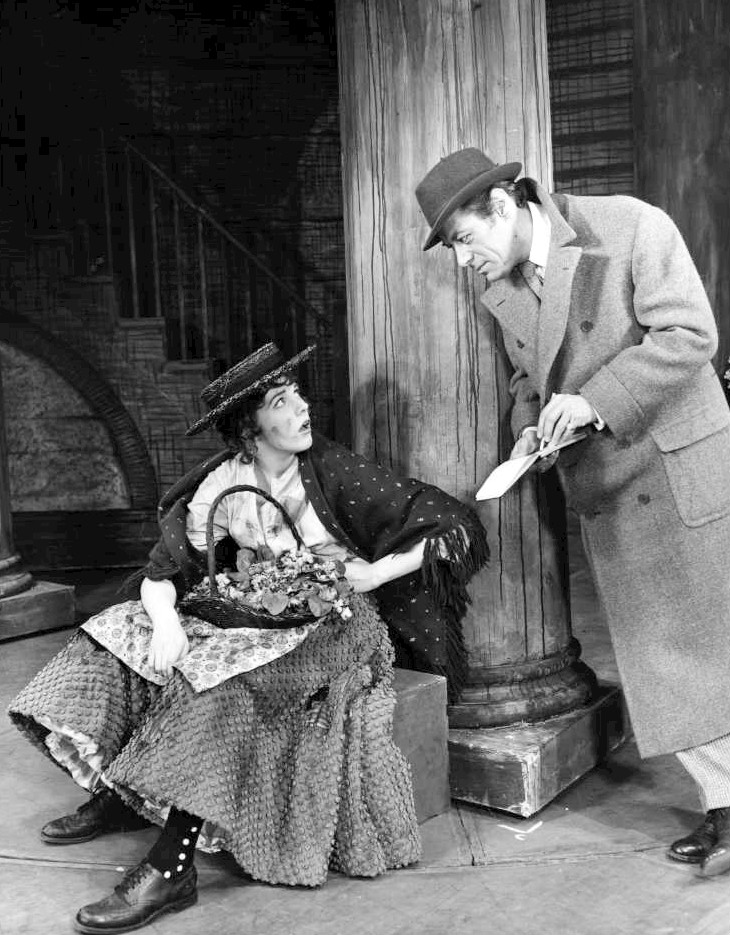
Julie Andrews and Rex Harrison in their costumes made by Helene Pons for the 1957 Broadway production of My Fair Lady. Andrews stated Pons was "a little mother to me" during this production.

As GHPS's business grew beyond what Pons and her husband could execute alone, the couple hired additional staff and moved the business out of their apartment to much larger premises on the 13th floor of a building at 254 54th Street in Manhattan. By 1943 George and Helene had 12 full time employees making costumes for their business. The organization was particularly well known in the New York theatre community for being able to respond well to costume emergencies with rapid turn-around and skill. It was also innovative in its use of dyes, stains, and distressing fabric to make it look aged. Helene pioneered several techniques that have become standard in the costume industry; including inventing a method of knitting metallic cord to create costume chain mail for the original production of Camelot (1960).

Some of the Broadway productions Pons designed for in the 1940s included Ladies in Retirement (1940), Five Alarm Waltz (1941), Watch on the Rhine (1941), The Distant City (1941), The Three Sisters (1942), Portrait in Black (1947), Duet for Two Hands (1947), The Men We Marry (1948), and Hedda Gabler (1948) among others. Her designs for a 1941-1942 production of William Shakespeare's Macbeth were so well received that she was invited to create her own ready-to-wear fashion line based on the fabrics from the show which was carried by American department stores. The following year the apron she designed for the play Harriet led her to an invitation to design a line of aprons for Bloomingdale's. She also made the costumes for the original productions of Pal Joey (1940) and Kiss Me, Kate (1948).

Pon made more than 200 costumes that were designed by Donald Oenslager for the Metropolitan Opera's ("Met") 1947 productions of Martha and Fidelio. In 1948 she designed the costumes for a new ballet by Ballet Russe de Monte-Carlo (BRMC), Billy Sunday. She had previously designed for the BRMC's production of The Public Gardens which was given at the Metropolitan Opera House in 1936. In 1950 she designed the costumes for Herbert Ross's first ballet, Caprichos, which was staged by the American Ballet Theatre at the Center Theatre. In 1952 she designed costumes for the Met's new production of Aida.

In the 1950s Pons created designs for the Broadway productions Paris '90 (1952), The Time of the Cuckoo (1952), The Skin of Our Teeth (1955), Holiday for Lovers (1957), and Maria Golovin (1958). In 1952 she designed the costumes for Zachary Solov's new ballet Mlle. Fifi which premiered in Boston and was created as a starring vehicle for Alexandra Danilova. It later ran at the Century Theatre in New York in a production by the Slavenska-Franklin Ballet. In 1956 she was nominated for the Tony Award for Best Costume Design at the 10th Tony Awards for her designs for three 1955 plays: The Diary of Anne Frank, A View from the Bridge, and The Heavenly Twins. She also contributed costumes designs to the film White Christmas (1954), and made the costumes for the original production of My Fair Lady (1956).

Helene's husband, George, died in 1959. After his death she continued to operate GHPS for six more years. Some of her final designs for Broadway were for A Lovely Light (1960), Sail Away (1961), and Love and Kisses (1963). She authored the children's book The Story of Vanya (1963, Viking Press) which was a popular success upon its release. It was based on stories of her brother from his childhood, and was originally written for her three grandchildren. Upon her retirement in 1965 she moved to Rome to be near her daughter, Giselle Pons-Marziale, who lived there with her Italian husband and their children. In 1970 an exhibition of her art sketches was given at the Wright Hepburn Webster Gallery in New York City.

Pons died of kidney disease at a health clinic in Rome on April 19, 1990, at the age of 91.

== Partial list of credits ==
Costumes designed by Helene Pons unless otherwise indicated.

=== Broadway ===
==== 1920s ====
- Presentations (1924, Strand Theatre)
- Hamlet (1925, National Theatre)
- The Trumpet Shall Sound (1926, American Laboratory Theatre)
- Kuan Yin (1926, Neighborhood Playhouse); designed by Ernest de Weerth and made by GHPS
- Devil in the Cheese (1926, Charles Hopkins Theatre)
- The Strange Prince (1926, Booth Theatre)
- The Ivory Door (1927, Charles Hopkins Theatre)
- The Mikado (1927, Royale Theatre); executed the hand painting of the costumes only
- If (1927, Little Theatre); designed by Aline Bernstein and made by GHPS
- 12,000 (1928, Garrick Theatre); designed only the costumes for actress Mary Ellis
- The Cherry Orchard (1928, Civic Repertory Theatre); designed by Aline Bernstein, men's costumes made by Helene Pons
- The Three Sisters (1928, Civic Repertory Theatre); designed by Gladys Calthrop, soldiers costumes made by GHPS
- Macbeth (1928, Knickerbocker Theatre)
- Doctor Knock (1928, American Laboratory Theatre); costumes designed by Clement Wilenchik and made by GHPS
- Marco Millions (1928, Guild Theatre); costumes designed by Lee Simonson and made by GHPS
- The Age of Innocence (1928, Empire Theatre); co-designed by Gertrude Newell & Barbier, and made by GHPS
- Volpone (1928, Guild Theatre); costumes designed by Lee Simonson and made by GHPS
- The Grand Street Follies of 1928 (1928, Booth Theatre); costumes designed by Aline Bernstein and made by GHPS
- Goethe's Faust as adapted by Tristan Rawson (1928, Guild Theatre); costumes designed by Lee Simonson and made by GHPS
- Peter Pan (1928, Civic Repertory Theatre); co-designed with Aline Bernstein
- Berkeley Square (1929, Lyceum Theatre); co-designed with B. J. Simmons & Co.
- Judas (1929, Longacre Theatre); designed by Richard Boleslavsky and made by GHPS
- Young Alexander (1929, Biltmore Theatre); designed by Agnes Clarke and made by GHPS
- Becky Sharp (1929, Knickerbocker Theatre); designed by Robert Edmond Jones and made by GHPS
- The Little Show (1929, Music Box Theatre); designed by Ruth Brenner and made by GHPS
- The Game of Love and Death (1929, Guild Theatre); costumes designed by Aline Bernstein and made by GHPS
- The Living Corpse (1929, Civic Repertory Theatre); costumes designed by Aline Bernstein and made by GHPS

==== 1930s ====
- A Month in the Country (1930, Guild Theatre); designed by Mstislav Dobuzhinsky and made by GHPS
- Garrick Gaieties (1930, Guild Theatre); designed by Kate Drain Lawson & Louis M. Simon, and made by GHPS
- Marseilles (1930, Henry Miller's Theatre); designed only the gowns
- Elizabeth the Queen (1930, Guild Theatre); costumes designed by Lee Simonson and made by GHPS
- Second Little Show (1930, Royale Theatre)
- The Wives of Henry VIII (1931, Avon Theatre); costumes based on the portraits by Hans Holbein the Younger and envisioned/made by Helene Pons
- Hamlet (1931, Broadhurst Theatre); designed by Norman Bel Geddes and made by GHPS
- Hey Nonny Nonny! (1932, Shubert Theatre)
- The Mad Hopes (1932, Broadhurst Theatre)
- Flying Colors (1932, Imperial Theatre); designed by Constance Ripley and made by GHPS
- The Warrior's Husband (1932, Morosco Theatre); designed by Woodman Thompson and made by GHPS
- Night Over Taos (1932, 48th Street Theatre); designed by Robert Edmond Jones and made by GHPS
- Through the Years (1932, Manhattan Theatre); designed by John Booth, Jr. and made by GHPS
- Christopher Comes Across (1932, Royale Theatre); designed by Dale Stetson, and made by GHPS
- Lucrece (1932, Belasco Theatre); designed by Robert Edmond Jones and made by GHPS
- Gay Divorce (1932, Ethel Barrymore Theatre); Raymond Sovey was the costume supervisor and GHPS was one of several firms contributing designs and manufacturing
- Jezebel (1933, Ethel Barrymore Theatre)
- The Loves of Charles II (1933, 48th Street Theatre)
- Run, Little Chillun (1933, Lyric Theatre)
- The School for Husbands (1933, Empire Theatre); designed by Lee Simonson and men's costumes made by GHPS
- Shooting Star (1933, Selwyn Theatre)
- The Lady from the Sea (1934, Little Theatre)
- Moor Born (1934, Playhouse Theatre)
- Theodora, The Quean (1934, Forrest Theatre)
- Revenge with Music (1934, New Amsterdam Theatre)
- Romeo and Juliet (1935, Martin Beck Theatre); designed by Jo Mielziner and made by GHPS
- The Old Maid (1935, Empire Theatre); designed by Stewart Chaney and made by GHPS
- The Simpleton of the Unexpected Isles (1935, Guild Theatre); designed by Lee Simonson and made by GHPS
- Mansion on the Hudson (1935, Booth Theatre)
- Parnell (1935, Ethel Barrymore Theatre); designed by Stewart Chaney and made by GHPS
- On Your Toes (1936, Imperial Theatre); designed by Irene Sharaff and made by GHPS
- The Golden Journey (1936, Booth Theatre)
- Sweet River (1936, Hollywood Theatre); designed gowns only
- Ten Million Ghosts (1936, St. James Theatre); designed gown for Barbara O'Neil
- Hamlet (1936, Empire Theatre); designed by Jo Mielziner and made by GHPS
- Plumes in the Dust (1936, 46th Street Theatre); designed by Woodman Thompson and made by GHPS
- Prelude to Exile (1936, Guild Theatre); designed by Lee Simonson and made by GHPS
- The Wingless Victory (1936, Empire Theatre); designed by Jo Mielziner and made by GHPS
- Aged 26 (1936, Lyceum Theatre); designed by Stewart Chaney and made by GHPS
- The Eternal Road (1937, Manhattan Opera House); designed by Norman Bel Geddes and made by GHPS
- Candida (1937, Empire Theatre); designed by Woodman Thompson and made by GHPS
- A Doll's House (1937, Morosco Theatre); contributed some of the costume designs for women
- Babes in Arms (1937, Shubert Theatre)
- Brown Sugar (1937, Biltmore Theatre)
- Barchester Towers (1937, Martin Beck Theatre; designed by Jo Mielziner and made by GHPS
- Edna His Wife (1937, Little Theatre)
- Shadow and Substance (1938, John Golden Theatre)
- Our Town (1938,Henry Miller's Theatre)
- How to Get Tough About It (1938, Martin Beck Theatre)
- Escape This Night (1938, 44th Street Theatre)
- Madame Capet (1938, Cort Theatre)
- The Primrose Path (1939, Biltmore Theatre)
- Key Largo (1939, Ethel Barrymore Theatre)

==== 1940s ====
- Pal Joey (1940, Ethel Barrymore Theatre), designed by John Koenig; costumes made by GHPS
- Two On An Island (1940, Broadhurst Theatre)
- Ladies in Retirement (1940, Henry Miller's Theatre)
- Grey Farm (1940, Hudson Theatre); designed costumes for Evelyn Varden only
- The Flying Gerardos (1940, Playhouse Theatre)
- Arsenic and Old Lace (1941, Fulton Theatre); designed dresses for Josephine Hull and Jean Adair only
- Ring Around Elizabeth (1941, Playhouse Theatre); designed sailing costume for Jane Cowl
- Five Alarm Waltz (1941, Playhouse Theatre)
- Macbeth (1941, National Theatre)
- Watch on the Rhine (1941, Martin Beck Theatre)
- The Distant City (1941, Longacre Theatre)
- Angel Street (1941, John Golden Theatre)
- The Three Sisters (1942, Ethel Barrymore Theatre)
- Lily of the Valley (1942, Windsor Theater)
- Portrait in Black (1947, Booth Theatre)
- How I Wonder (1947, Hudson Theatre)
- Duet for Two Hands (1947, Booth Theatre)
- The Men We Marry (1948, Mansfield Theatre)
- Ghosts (1948, Cort Theatre); designed Eva Le Gallienne's costumes only
- Hedda Gabler (1948, Cort Theatre)
- Where Stars Walk (1948, Mansfield Theatre)
- Kiss Me, Kate (1948, New Century Theatre), designed by Lemuel Ayers; costumes made by GHPS

==== 1950s ====
- Paris '90 (1952, Booth Theatre)
- The Time of the Cuckoo (1952, Empire Theater)
- Anastasia (1954, Lyceum Theatre)
- The Skin of Our Teeth (1955, Plymouth Theatre)
- The Diary of Anne Frank (1955, Cort Theatre)
- A Memory of Two Mondays (1955, Coronet Theatre)
- A View from the Bridge (1955, Coronet Theatre)
- The Heavenly Twins (1955, Booth Theatre)
- The Dark Is Light Enough (1955, ANTA Playhouse)
- My Fair Lady (1956, Mark Hellinger Theatre), designed by Cecil Beaton; costumes made by GHPS
- Holiday for Lovers (1957, Longacre Theatre)
- Romanoff and Juliet (1957, Plymouth Theatre)
- Monique (1957, John Golden Theatre)
- Epitaph for George Dillon (1958, John Golden Theatre); costume supervisor
- Maria Golovin (1958, Martin Beck Theatre)
- Epitaph for George Dillon (1958, Henry Miller's Theatre)

==== 1960s ====
- Camelot (1960), designed by Adrian; costumes made by GHPS
- A Lovely Light (1960, Hudson Theatre)
- Semi-Detached (1960, Martin Beck Theatre)
- Sail Away (1961, Broadhurst Theatre)
- Daughter of Silence (1961, Music Box Theatre)
- Love and Kisses (1963, Music Box Theatre)

=== Regional theatre ===
- Peter Ibbetson (1932, Bonstelle Theatre, Detroit); co-designed with Robert Edmund Jones
- The Pure in Heart (1932, staged by the Theatre Guild in Baltimore and Pittsburgh)
- No Money to Guide Her (1932, Boston)
- Yankee Fable (1938, staged in Boston and Washington D.C.)
