= The Ghosts of Berkeley Square =

- Screenshot from the film, with Felix Aylmer and Robert Morley
- Directed by: Vernon Sewell
- Screenplay by: James Seymour
- Based on: No Nightingales by Caryl Brahms and S. J. Simon
- Produced by: Louis H. Jackson
- Starring: Robert Morley; Felix Aylmer
- Cinematography: Ernest Palmer
- Edited by: Joseph Sterling
- Music by: Hans May
- Production company: British National Films
- Distributed by: Pathe Pictures (UK)
- Release date: 30 October 1947 (UK)
- Running time: 100 minutes
- Country: United Kingdom
- Language: English

The Ghosts of Berkeley Square is a 1947 British comedy film, directed by Vernon Sewell and starring Robert Morley and Felix Aylmer. The film is an adaptation of the 1944 novel No Nightingales by Caryl Brahms and S. J. Simon, inspired by the enduring reputation of the property at 50 Berkeley Square as "the most haunted house in London". Despite its stellar cast of highly respected character actors and its inventive use of special effects, the film proved less successful at the box-office than had been hoped.

== Plot ==
At the 1000th Annual dinner of the Old Ghosts Association General 'Jumbo' Burlap and Colonel 'Bulldog' Kelsoe present the story of their death and haunting to the general public after the inter-terrestrial hookup of radio and television allows communication between humans and spirits. In the 18th Century, Burlap and Kelsoe are officers in the army of Queen Anne who have recently retired and purchased a house on Berkeley Square. At a house-warming party the pair speculate how to win the war however they learn that the Duke of Marlborough has other plans that will lead to the Battle of Malplaquet. Believing the battle will end in slaughter they hatch a plan to capture Marlborough and hold him prisoner until the threat of hostilities passes. They build a contraption to drop Marlborough through a trapdoor onto a mattress in the cellar, however when they elect to test their device, they are killed as the mattress has been removed. Their deaths prevent a planned visit by Queen Anne.

Burlap and Kelsoe watch their funeral procession and speculate about being ghosts when they are sent a book of rules and regulations as well as documents to sign from beyond. Later, the pair are also subjected to a court-martial who find them guilty for crimes against the Crown, sentencing Burlap and Kelsoe to haunt their Berkeley Square residence until it is visited by a member or reigning royalty. Lady Mary looks at buying the now empty house however as the Queen hates her Burlap and Kelsoe decide to scare her away. Realising that by scaring Lady Mary away the house will now be labelled as haunted and therefore never sell and be visited by royalty, Burlap and Kelsoe blame each other for the fiasco, quarrel, and refuse to speak to each other. 66 years later, after adopting a ghostly cat, Burlap and Kelsoe receive a Christmas present along with a Christmas Tree and decide to forgive each other.

15 years later the house is occupied by Madam Millie, who demands to see Burlap and Kelsoe. The pair materialise before her and she explains that while she is not frightened of them they must not bother her girls. She also claims to know the King and that he is likely to visit. Burlap and Kelsoe discover that Millie has turned their home into a bordello and while Kelsoe is initially shocked, Burlap studies different methods of materialising so he can head downstairs to gamble, drink, and be entertained by Millie's girls. When Kelsoe realises Burlap has gone he also learns how to materialise, joining Burlap and the girls. When Millie discovers Burlap and Kelsoe have broken their promise to leave her girls alone, she charges them for services and damages. Having no money, Burlap decides to use a ghostly Kelsoe to help him cheat at cards and use the winnings to pay off their debts, however when they are accused of cheating a massive fight breaks out. Millie and her girls are arrested, the bordello is trashed and closed, and the King's equerry prevents the royal visit.

Over the next 75 years Berkeley Square becomes home to a number of governmental departments before being purchased by T.B. Farnum (a play on P. T. Barnum) and his multicultural performers. Burlap and Kelsoe scare many of the performers, who then refuse to reenter the house. Farnum reopens Berkeley Square as a Haunted house, however Burlap and Kelsoe take offence to the fake tours and agree to perform as part of a ghostly show instead. When Prince Albert shows an interest in attending the show Dr. Cruickshank of the Psychical Research Society visits to judge if the ghosts are genuine. He decides that although the haunting is real if he says so in his report he will either be called a liar or the Society (whose purpose is to prove that ghosts do not exist) will be disbanded. He therefore labels Farnum as a hoax, causing the Prince Consort to cancel his visit and Farnum to leave Berkeley Square. Several years later the house is purchased by the Nawab of Bagwash, an Indian rajah and descendant of Burlap, who does not count as reigning royalty as Queen Victoria has recently become Empress of India. Kelsoe and Burlap learn about mesmerism and attempt to convince the Nawab of Bagwash to invite the Queen to visit, however her visit is cancelled upon discovery of the Nawab of Bagwash's Harem.

Berkeley Square is sold once again and becomes a soldiers' hospital during the Boer War. Burlap and Kelsoe learn that a patient, Captain Dodds, is being awarded the Victoria Cross, and as he is too weak to visit the palace, Queen Victoria will visit him in hospital instead. Dodds however takes a turn for the worse and is unlikely to survive the night, so Burlap and Kelsoe give him Penicillin, hoping he will survive until Queen Victoria can visit. Dodds however makes such a recovery that he is able to visit the Palace after all, a fact Burlap and Kelsoe happily accept. During World War I Berkeley Square becomes an officers' club where Burlap and Kelsoe are accused of faking their military rank and labelled as German spies. During an air raid Berkeley Square is bombed and Burlap and Kelsoe are left amongst the rubble. Queen Mary comes to visit the damaged property, allowing Burlap and Kelsoe to finally take their place in the afterlife.

== Main cast ==
- Robert Morley as Gen. "Jumbo" Burlap / Nawab of Bagwash
- Felix Aylmer as Col. H. "Bulldog" Kelsoe
- Yvonne Arnaud as Millie
- Claude Hulbert as Merryweather
- Abraham Sofaer as Benjamin Disraeli
- Ernest Thesiger as Dr. Cruickshank
- Marie Lohr as Lottie
- Martita Hunt as Lady Mary
- A. E. Matthews as Gen. Bristow
- John Longden as Mortimer Digby
- Ronald Frankau as Tex Farnum
- Wilfrid Hyde-White as Staff Captain
- Wally Patch as Foreman
- Esmé Percy as Vizier
- Mary Jerrold as Lettie
- Martin Miller as Professor
- Diane Hart as Minette (uncredited)
- James Hayter as Capt. Dodds(uncredited)
- Edward Lexy as Brigadier (uncredited)
- Aubrey Mallalieu as Butler (uncredited)
- Strelsa Brown as Amazon Attendant (uncredited)

== Production ==
Vernon Sewell who directed said he liked the film "very much" adding that:

I thought it was very funny. I had a terrific cast, terrific cast! All the best actors there were in England in it, and it had five periods of changes of costume. I wanted to make it in colour and I wanted to make it on exterior... But they wouldn't agree, they wouldn't agree. Well the studio roof had to be raised twenty feet to build the faade of Berkeley Square at the studio. We made the film and of course, the terrible storms in the middle of it, the scene wall blew down and, oh, all that sort of trouble! But anyhow, I thought it was a very funny film and all the critics did, but you had to know a bit about English history to understand it. You had to know there was a Boer War, there was a Queen Anne and there was a Prince Regent, you had to know they - you had to have the very, very basic knowledge, which people apparently didn't have, and people didn't understand it.

== Reception ==
Kinematograph Weekly declared the film "seldom drifts from Berkeley Square and its limited viewpoint prevents the big stage cast from making the most of its humours. Starless and for the most part witless, its laughs, such as they are, can be counted on the fingers of one hand. "

== See also ==
- List of ghost films
