= Give Us the Moon =

- Original British film poster
- Directed by: Val Guest
- Screenplay by: Val Guest
- Based on: The Elephant is White by Caryl Brahms and S.J. Simon
- Produced by: Edward Black
- Starring: Margaret Lockwood; Vic Oliver; Roland Culver; Peter Graves; Jean Simmons
- Cinematography: Phil Grindrod
- Edited by: R. E. Dearing
- Music by: Bob Busby
- Production company: Gainsborough Pictures
- Distributed by: General Film Distributors (UK)
- Release date: 31 July 1944 (UK)
- Running time: 95 minutes
- Country: United Kingdom
- Language: English
- Budget: £69,000

Give Us the Moon is a 1944 British comedy film directed and written by Val Guest and starring Vic Oliver, Margaret Lockwood and Peter Graves. It was written by Guest, based on the 1939 novel The Elephant is White by Caryl Brahms and S.J. Simon.

== Plot ==
The film is set in a future peacetime Britain, after the end of World War II. Peter Pyke, the son of a millionaire hotel owner, had been an RAF pilot during the war but, much to the frustration of his hard-working father, he does not want to work for a living, and idles his time away while living in the Eisenhower Hotel, run by his father. So when Peter stumbles across a group of people, mainly White Russian émigrés who call themselves “White Elephants” and refuse to work or be of any use to society, he eagerly accepts their invitation to join them.

== Cast ==
- Margaret Lockwood as Nina
- Vic Oliver as Sascha
- Peter Graves as Peter Pyke
- Roland Culver as Ferdinand
- Frank Cellier as Pyke senior
- Eliot Makeham as General Dumka
- George Relph as Otto
- Max Bacon as Jacobus
- Alan Keith as Raphael
- Jean Simmons as Heidi
- John Salew as landlord
- Iris Lang as Tania
- Gibb McLaughlin as Marcel
- Irene Handl as Miss Haddock

== Production ==
The film is based on the 1939 novel The Elephant is White, written by Caryl Brahms and her Russian émigré writing partner S.J. Simon, with the story moved from 1930s Paris to late-1940s London. Brahms and Simon provided additional dialogue to Guest's screenplay.

Guest said Lockwood "had been dying to do comedy and I had a big fight to get, even Ted, to get her to do" the film. "It was a great departure for her, it opened her up... She had an enormous sense of fun, real lavatory laugh, raucous, and the ideal partner for her, and a real charmer, and I wrote him into every film I did as a juvenile lead was Peter Graves who had this great Niven-like quality, in fact he looked like Niven in those days, great throwaway charm and sophistication, so I wrote him into all those movies."

Jean Simmons was cast in one of her first roles.

The film came in under budget.

== Release ==
The film opened at the New Gallery cinema in London on 31 July 1944,

== Reception ==
The Monthly Film Bulletin wrote: "Val Guest ... has not quite captured the irresponsible fun of the novel. His handling of Margaret Lockwood and the Young Man (Peter Graves) falters between the romantic and the fantastic, and fails to achieve a happy marriage. Then he allows the stage mannerisms of Vic Oliver to obtrude – to the interruption of the smooth flow of incident-narrative. There are, nevertheless, plenty of laughs in this string of comic situations, and the performance of Jean Simmons as the awful eleven-year-old is incisive and brilliantly sustained."

Kine Weekly wrote: "Eccentric romantic comedy, set in imaginary post-war London. The 'good companions' (or should it be bad) story obviously aims at satire, but erratic direction and treatment allow it to fall short of its mark."

The Times reviewer found it to be "a film which opens well [but] ends not with the bang of vigorous cinematic invention but the whimper of overworked dialogue".

Variety wrote: "Give Us the Moon is an absurdity which owes much to its lightness of treatment, often-witty lines, novelty, and occasional naive charm. But although the scripters evade responsibility for credulity by placing the action in postwar London (a period when anything can, and probably will, happen), the originality of theme wears thin. Cutting would help."

Val Guest said "it wasn't a successful picture, perhaps too sophisticated for what they wanted, the whole idea of a club of people who didn't want to work, they became a club, a white elephant club, and were earning by their wits."
