= Irene Browne =

British actress (1891–1965)

Browne's 1936 Spotlight photo

Irene Muriel Browne (23 February 1891 – 24 July 1965) was an English stage and film actress and singer who appeared in plays and musicals, including No, No, Nanette. Later in her career, she became particularly associated with the works of Noël Coward and acted in films.

== Career ==
Irene Browne was born in London, England in 1891. She began her theatrical career in 1910 as a dancer in H.B. Irving's company and soon graduated to dramatic roles, appearing in J. Comyns Carr's dramatisation of Dr Jekyll and Mr Hyde the following year. For three years, she acted in Australia (The Times mistook her for Australian in 1915).

After returning to London, Browne played in musical comedy, in the title role of My Lady Frayle with Courtice Pounds in 1916. She appeared in revue alongside Beatrice Lillie in 1922, where she was spotted by Basil Dean and cast in his revival of Arthur Wing Pinero's 1899 playThe Gay Lord Quex at the Theatre Royal, Drury Lane starring with George Grossmith Jr., in which "she took the house by storm". In 1925, she appeared in the first London production of No, No, Nanette ("Miss Irene Browne glitters most dangerously"). She soon toured for two years in America.

On her return to Britain, Browne played in Noël Coward's Cavalcade (1931) at Drury Lane and in the Hollywood film adaptation two years later. She continued to be associated with Coward, creating roles in his musicals Conversation Piece (1934), After the Ball (1954) and The Girl Who Came to Supper (1963), and appeared in Blithe Spirit and Relative Values during their long West End runs.

Browne also performed in N.C. Hunter's long-running Waters of the Moon (playing the role created by Edith Evans), co-starring with Sybil Thorndike. She also appeared in plays by Ivor Novello, Dodie Smith, William Wycherley and St. John Hankin. Browne also played roles in a number of Hollywood films.

Browne died in London of cancer in 1965 at the age of 74.

== Filmography ==
Year	Title	Role	Notes
1917	Drink	Gervaise	
1919	After Many Days	Connie	
1929	The Letter	Mrs. Joyce	
1933	Cavalcade	Margaret Harris	
1933	Christopher Strong	Carrie Valentine	
1933	Peg o' My Heart	Mrs. Chichester	
1933	Berkeley Square	Lady Ann Pettigrew	
1933	My Lips Betray	Queen Mother Therese	
1936	The Amateur Gentleman	Lady Huntstanton	
1938	Pygmalion	Duchess	
1941	The Prime Minister	Lady Londonderry	
1941	Kipps	Mrs. Bindon-Botting	
1947	Meet Me at Dawn	Mme. Renault	
1948	The Red Shoes	Lady Neston	
1948	Quartet	Lady Bland	Segment "The Alien Corn"
1949	The Bad Lord Byron	Lady Melbourne	
1949	Trottie True	Duchess	Uncredited
1950	Madeleine	Mrs. Grant	Uncredited
1951	The House in the Square	Lady Anne Pettigrew	
1957	Barnacle Bill	Mrs. Barrington	
1958	Rooney	Mrs. Manning ffrench	
1959	Serious Charge	Mrs. Phillips	
1963	The Wrong Arm of the Law	Dowager	Final film role

== Selected stage roles ==
- Jane (1947)
