= No Nightingales =

1944 novel

- 1953 edition
- Author: Caryl Brahms; S.J. Simon
- Language: English
- Genre: Comedy
- Publisher: Michael Joseph
- Publication date: 1944
- Publication place: United Kingdom
- Media type: Print

No Nightingales is a 1944 comedy novel by Caryl Brahms and S.J. Simon, a regular writing team between 1937 and 1950. The title is a reference to the popular wartime song A Nightingale Sang in Berkeley Square. The novel is loosely inspired by the legend of the supposedly haunted townhouse 50 Berkeley Square.

== Film adaptation ==
In 1947 it was turned into a film The Ghosts of Berkeley Square directed by Vernon Sewell and starring Robert Morley, Felix Aylmer, Yvonne Arnaud and Claude Hulbert.

== Bibliography ==
- Goble, Alan. The Complete Index to Literary Sources in Film. Walter de Gruyter, 1999.
