= Skidelsky =

Skidelsky is a surname. Notable people with the surname include:

- Robert Skidelsky (1939–2026), British economic historian, author, and crossbench life peer
- S. J. Simon (Seca Jascha Skidelsky)
