= Berkeley Square =

Town square in the West End of London, England

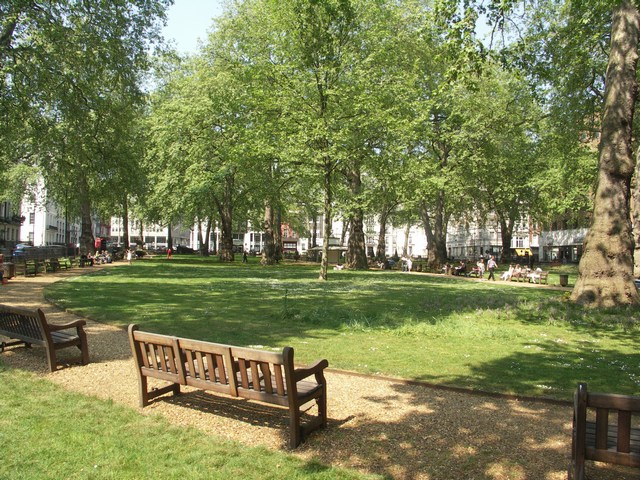
- Berkeley Square, 2007

- Location within City of Westminster
- Location: Mayfair, London
- Postal code: W1J
- Coordinates: 51°30′35″N 0°08′45″W

Other
- Designer: William Kent
- Website: www.westminster.gov.uk/parks-and-open-spaces/berkeley-square

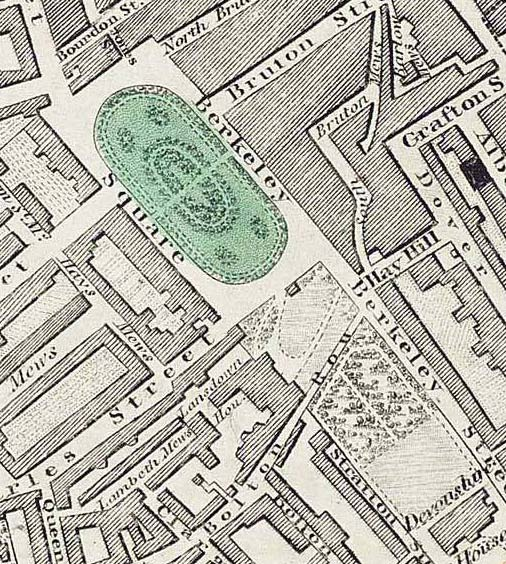
Berkeley Square in 1830.

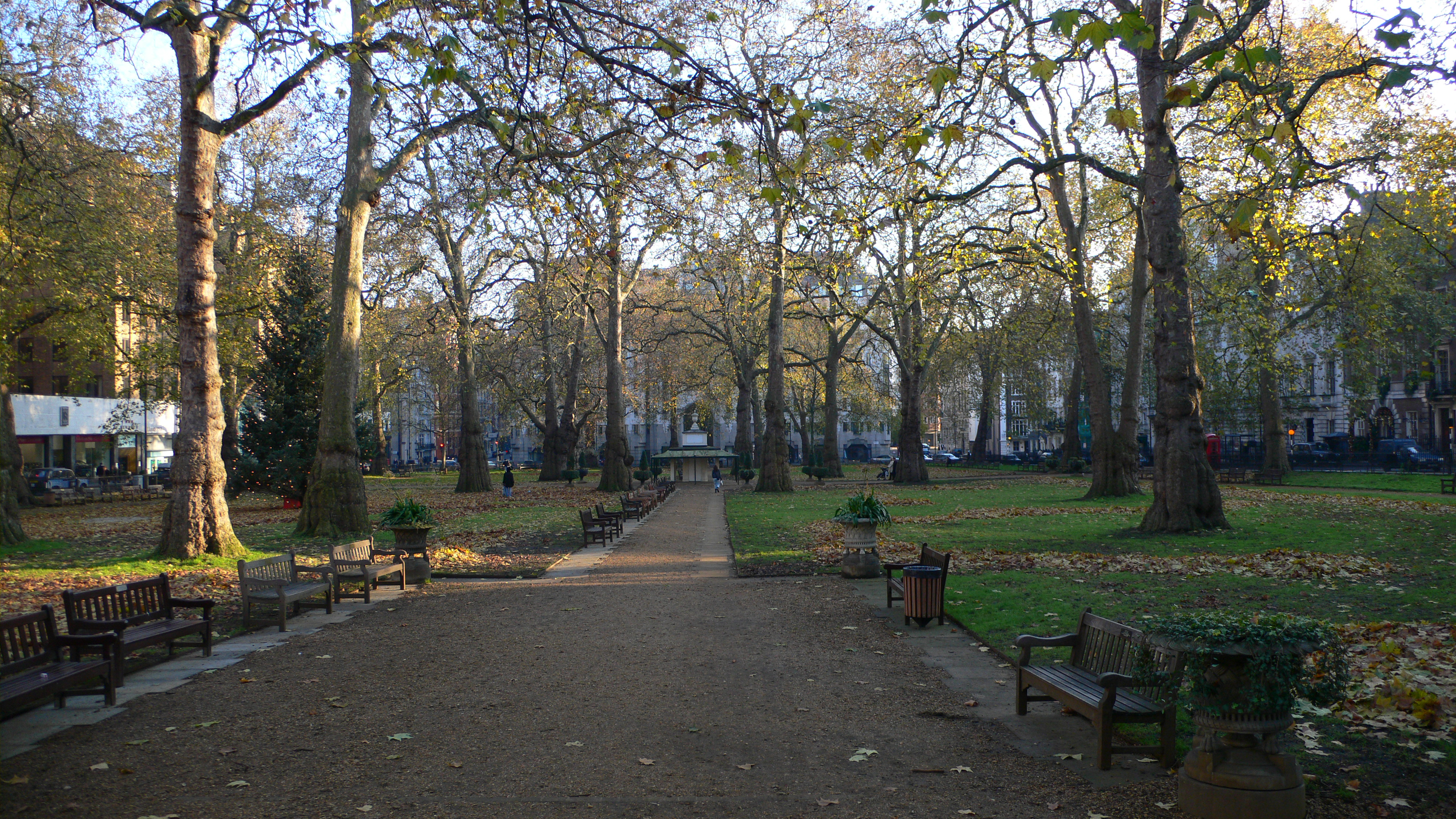
Berkeley Square, 2005

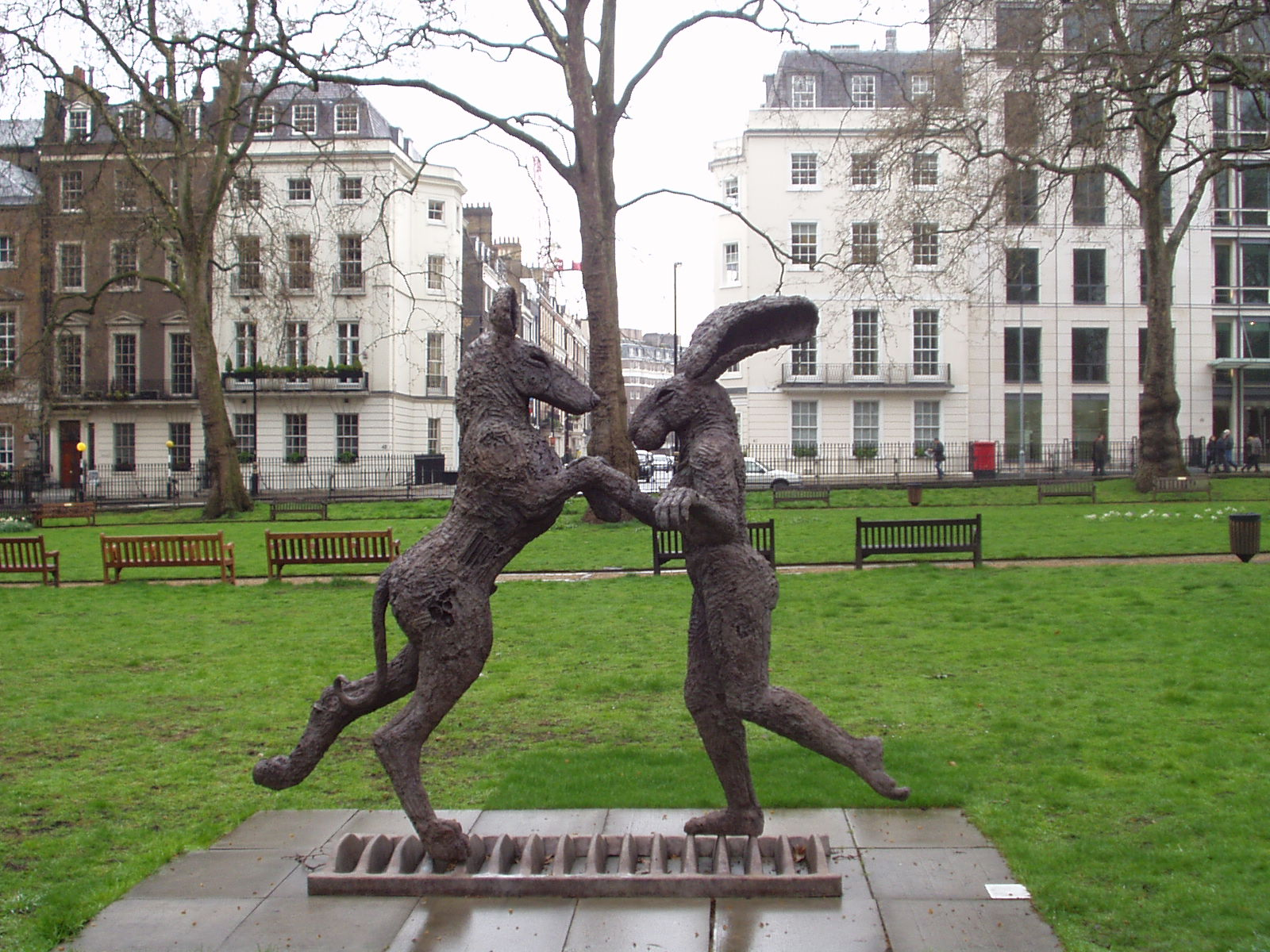
Hares by Sophie Ryder, Berkeley Square

Berkeley Square (/ˈbɑːrkli/) is a garden square in the West End of London. It is one of the best known of the many squares in London, located in Mayfair in the City of Westminster. It was laid out in the mid 18th century by the architect William Kent, and originally extended further south. The garden's very large London plane trees are among the oldest in central London, planted in 1789.

== Description ==
=== Buildings ===
Like most squares in British cities, it is surrounded largely by terraced houses, in this case grand townhouses. Originally these were the London residences of very wealthy families who would spend most of the year at their country house. Only one building, number 48, remains wholly residential. (Note: Numbering is from 1 to 57 but many are missed; one building is named with no numbering, Berkeley Square House.) Most have been converted into offices for businesses typical of Mayfair, such as bluechips' meeting spaces, hedge funds, niche headhunters and wealth management businesses.

The buildings' architects included Robert Adam but 9 Fitzmaurice Place (since 1935 home of the Lansdowne Club, earlier known as Shelb(o)urne then Lansdowne House – all three names referring to the same branch of one family) is now on the south corner's approach ("Fitzmaurice Place"). The daring staircase-hall of No.44 is sometimes considered William Kent's masterpiece. Gunter's Tea Shop, founded under a different name in 1757, used to trade here.

In the 1930s several townhouses were demolished to make space for a new office block, Berkley Square House. The construction of the new building was depicted in Charles Cundall's 1938 painting Building in Berkeley Square.

Approach ways include Berkeley Street, Bruton Street, Curzon Street, and Hill Street.

=== Gardens ===
The gardens of Berkeley Square are Grade II listed (are in the initial category) on the Register of Historic Parks and Gardens. They are plain from the horticultural point of view, with grass and paths, but dominated by a group of London plane trees around the gardens, planted in 1789, the year of the French Revolution.

In 2008, one of the trees was said to be the "most valuable street tree in Britain" by the London Tree Officers Association, in terms of its size, health, historical significance and the number of people who live near to it. One in the south-west corner is a Great Tree of London.

The square features a sculptural fountain by Alexander Munro, a Pre-Raphaelite sculptor, made in 1865. The fountain was donated by the third Marquess of Lansdowne, and replaced a statue of George II which was removed in 1827. On the eastern side is a bronze sculpture of Velasquez' Reina Mariana by Manolo Valdes.

== History ==
The square was originally the bottom of the large garden of Berkeley House on Piccadilly, subsequently Devonshire House. In 1696, John Berkeley, 3rd Baron Berkeley of Stratton, sold the house and much of the garden to William Cavendish, 1st Duke of Devonshire, but retained a significant area at the bottom, including the site of Berkeley Square.

The square is among those (Note: Analogous to the leading case in English law concerning Leicester Square, Tulk v Moxhay.) that demonstrate non-waiver of (no later agreement to forego) restrictive covenants. In 1696, with express intent to bind later owners, Berkeley undertook not to build on land retained very directly behind the house, so preserving the view from the rear of the ducal residence. The southernmost portion saw either a breach and passage of 20 years without claim (the limitation period of deeds) or a release of covenant agreement struck up – it was until about 1930 legally required green space, namely gardens of 9 Fitzmaurice Place. They became the new south side of the square.

== Famous residents ==
Residents have included:

- John Byng (1741), executed Vice-Admiral, Royal Navy. His home was decorated by architect Isaac Ware
- Horace Walpole 1779 until 1797 death—at No.11
- George Canning, Prime Minister (1827)—at No.50
- Winston Churchill—at No.48 as a child
- Lady Isabella Finch-at No.44 until 1771, a Lady of the Bedchamber to Princess Amelia
- Robert Clive of India—bought No.45 in 1761, where he died in 1774
- Sarah Child Villiers, Countess of Jersey (Lady Jersey), one of the famous patronesses of Almack's and leaders of the ton during the Regency era; heiress to the Child & Co. banking fortune—at No.38
- Charles Rolls, co-founder of Rolls-Royce, born here 1877
- 50 Berkeley Square used to be occupied by Maggs Brothers Antiquarian Booksellers.

At Lansdowne House, formerly on the square:

- John Stuart, 3rd Earl of Bute, Prime Minister (1762–63)
- William Petty, 2nd Earl of Shelburne (later 1st Marquess of Lansdowne), prime minister (1782–83)
- William Pitt the Younger, prime minister (1783–1801, 1804–1806)
- William Waldorf Astor, 1st Viscount Astor, richest man in America at the time (1891–1893)
- Archibald Primrose, 5th Earl of Rosebery, Liberal statesman and Prime Minister (1894–1895)
- Harry Gordon Selfridge, founder of the Selfridges department store

=== Fictional residents ===
- P. G. Wodehouse's character Bertie Wooster lives near Berkeley Square in a Berkeley St. flat along with his valet Jeeves, not far from the Drones Club.
- Harry Flashman, the vicious bully of Tom Brown's School Days and anti-hero of the Flashman Papers, had a marital home here with his wife Elspeth.
- Cathy Lane, Patty Lane's "identical cousin", is said to have lived here in the theme song to The Patty Duke Show.
- 50 Berkeley Square is allegedly haunted.
- "Tomlinson", the title character of Rudyard Kipling's 1891 satirical poem, "gave up the ghost at his house in Berkeley Square".
- Peter Standish, a character from the play Berkeley Square written by John Balderston, about a Yankee who lives in a house on the square and is transported back to the 18th century. The play was produced as a film in 1933, with Leslie Howard, and in 1951, and on television in 1959.
- In the 1949 comedy film Kind Hearts and Coronets, Lady Agatha D'Ascogne is made to fall to her death in Berkeley Square to accommodate a clever poetic parody.
- Lady Emily Ashton, created by author Tasha Alexander, lives primarily in her Berkeley Square residence during the Victorian period.
- The Marquis of Alverstoke, the main male character from the novel Frederica by Georgette Heyer.
- The Stanton-Lacy family live in Berkeley Square, as seen in the novel The Grand Sophy, also by Heyer.
- The 1998 television miniseries Berkeley Square focussed on three wealthy Edwardian families and their staff living in the square.
- One of Peter Cheyney's main characters, private detective Slim Callaghan, had his office on Berkeley Square.

== Transport ==
Berkeley Square is a typical prime Central London distance from:

- Green Park Underground station (on the Piccadilly, Jubilee and Victoria lines)
- Bond Street Underground station (on the Central and Jubilee lines).

London Buses route 22 passes through the square.

Berkeley Square hosts vehicle charging points supplied by Elektromotive.

== See also ==
- 50 Berkeley Square, a building described as the most haunted house in London
- Berkeley Square (1933 film)
- Berkeley Square (TV series), broadcast in 1998 on BBC One
- The Ghosts of Berkeley Square, 1947 film
- Lansdowne House, now 9 Fitzmaurice Place, a town house south of Berkeley Square
- "A Nightingale Sang in Berkeley Square" (song), 1940
- A Nightingale Sang in Berkeley Square (film), 1980
- The Fleming Collection, a large private collection of Scottish art held in the square
- List of eponymous roads in London

== Sources ==
- "Berkeley Square, North Side", Survey of London: volume 40: The Grosvenor Estate in Mayfair, Part 2 (The Buildings) (1980) at British History Online (date accessed 5 July 2009)
- "Berkeley Square and its neighbourhood", Old and New London: Volume 4 (1878) at British History Online (date accessed 5 July 2009)
- Sykes, Christopher Simon. Private Palaces: Life in the Great London Houses, Chatto & Windus, 1985
