= The Sense of the Past =

Unfinished novel by Henry James

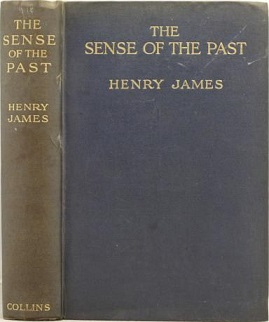
- The cover of first edition
- Author: Henry James
- Language: English
- Genre: Novel
- Publisher: W. Collins Sons & Co., London; Charles Scribner's Sons, New York City
- Publication date: Collins: 6-Sept-1917; Scribner's: 26-Oct-1917
- Publication place: United Kingdom, United States
- Media type: Print (Hardback & Paperback)
- Pages: Collins: 351 pp Scribner's: 358 pp

The Sense of the Past is an unfinished novel by the American author Henry James that was published in 1917, a year after James' death. The novel is at once an eerie account of time travel and a bittersweet comedy of manners. A young American trades places with a remote ancestor in early 19th-century England, and encounters many complications in his new surroundings.

== Plot summary ==
Young Ralph Pendrel of New York City has written a fine essay on the reading of history. The essay so impresses a distant English relative that he bequeaths an 18th-century London house to Ralph. Pendrel goes to London and explores the house thoroughly. He feels himself going back in time as soon as he crosses the threshold. He finds a portrait of a remote ancestor, also named Ralph Pendrel. The portrait comes alive and the two men meet.

Later, the modern-day Pendrel goes to the U.S. ambassador in London and tries to tell him of these strange occurrences. He then returns to the mysterious house, steps across the threshold, and finds himself in the early 19th century. At this dramatic juncture, the part of the novel that James wrote in 1900 breaks off. James resumed the novel in 1914 with scenes of Ralph meeting his ancestor's relatives, as he has taken the other's place. He finds that he is engaged to one of those relatives, Molly Midmore, but realizes that he is attracted to her sister Nan. He also meets Molly's mother and unpleasant brother, and Nan's suitor, Sir Cantopher Bland.

The novel breaks off completely here. James left extensive notes on how the novel would continue: Nan would eventually realize that Ralph is actually a time-traveller from the future; she would sacrifice her own happiness to help him return to his own time and to Aurora Coyne, a woman who had previously rejected Ralph but would now accept him.

== Publishing history ==
James wrote 110 pages of the novel between 1899 and 1900, but abandoned writing it because the material was becoming too intractable and convoluted. He instead began work on his novel The Ambassadors. He returned to the novel in 1914, at age 70, in a futile attempt to escape the horrors of World War I. He worked on it until early 1915, but again abandoned the novel, though he did write detailed notes on how it should finish. The incomplete novel and the author's notes were published after James' death with a brief introduction by Percy Lubbock.

== Key themes ==
James was generally not interested in long-ago eras. At most he was attracted by a more recent, "visitable" past. It's characteristic of his preference for present-day reality that The Sense of the Past would have ended with Ralph triumphantly returning from the early 19th century to his own time. Whether James could have managed all the complex details of Ralph's trip through the past and return to the present is a difficult question.

The new beginning James made in 1914 doesn't reassure the reader that the aging master was up to the formidable demands of the time-travel storyline. The 1914 section allows scenes to ramble far too long, and James appears to have lost his ability to impose much-needed order on his material. Still, if he could have somehow molded the novel into presentable shape, The Sense of the Past might have become a brilliant, subtle exploration of the influence of the past on the present. But it's impossible to judge a novel left mostly incomplete.

== Critical evaluation ==
After James' death this novel was converted into a successful play, which indicates the appeal of the subject-matter. Critics have regretted that James abandoned the book in 1900, then took up such complex material in 1914, when he was past seventy.

James brilliantly handles Ralph's initial exploration of the house, which leads to the meeting with his namesake ancestor. But James wrote that part of The Sense of the Past in 1900, when he was at the top of his form. By the time he returned to the novel in 1914, he simply didn't have the energy to overcome the technical challenges inherent in the material.

== Dramatic adaptations ==
The Sense of the Past was the inspiration for John L. Balderston's 1926 play Berkeley Square, frequently performed in London and elsewhere. To date two film versions of the play have been made. The film Berkeley Square, based on both the play and James' novel, was made in 1933 and starred Leslie Howard, who had also starred in the stage production in 1929. The second version, produced in England in 1951 and starring Tyrone Power, was titled The House in the Square for British release and I'll Never Forget You in the United States release. The latter version was released on DVD in July 2008 as part of the Tyrone Power — Matinee Idol collection.
