= Valerie Taylor (actress) =

English actress (1902–1988)

- Valerie Taylor and Harry Fowler in Went the Day Well?
- Born: Valerie Ferenze Taylor; 10 November 1902; Fulham, London, England
- Died: 24 October 1988 (aged 85); Kensington, London, England
- Education: Royal Academy of Dramatic Art (graduated 1922)
- Occupations: Actress, screenwriter
- Years active: 1920s–1960s
- Spouse(s): Hugh Sinclair (m.1930–?); Desborough William Saunders (m.1948–1979; his death)

Valerie Taylor (10 November 1902 – 24 October 1988) was an English actress who was born and died in London.

After graduating from the Royal Academy of Dramatic Art in 1922, her stage work included appearances at Stratford, as well as the original West End and Broadway productions of Berkeley Square in 1926 and 1929. She reprised her role in the 1933 Hollywood film version of the same. She was married to the actor Hugh Sinclair (1903–1962). Besides her acting credits, she also co-wrote the screenplay to the 1947 movie Take My Life.

== Filmography ==
Year	Title	Role	Notes
1933	Berkeley Square	Kate Pettigrew	
1934	Designing Women	Diana Dent	
1942	Went the Day Well?	Nora	
1948	The Long Mirror	Branwen Elder	(with Barbara Everest)
1960	Faces in the Dark	Miss Hopkins	
1961	What a Carve Up!	Janet Broughton	
1963	In the Cool of the Day	Lily Kendrick	
1965	Repulsion	Madame Denise	

== Selected stage credits ==
- Berkeley Square (1926) by John L. Balderston
- On Approval (1927) by Frederick Lonsdale
- Call It a Day (1935) by Dodie Smith
- Dear Octopus (1938) by Dodie Smith
- The Wind of Heaven (1945) by Emlyn Williams
- Happy with Either (1948) by Margaret Kennedy
- Venus Observed (1950) by Christopher Fry
- The Living Room (1953) by Graham Greene
- Eighty in the Shade (1958) by Clemence Dane
