= Berkeley Square (1933 film) =

1933 film

- Berkeley Square (1933, lobby card), Leslie Howard and Betty Lawford
- Directed by: Frank Lloyd
- Screenplay by: Sonya Levien; John L. Balderston
- Based on: Berkeley Square 1926 play by John L. Balderston; The Sense of the Past 1917 novel by Henry James
- Produced by: Jesse L. Lasky
- Starring: Leslie Howard; Heather Angel
- Cinematography: Ernest Palmer
- Edited by: Harold D. Schuster
- Music by: Louis De Francesco
- Distributed by: Fox Film Corporation
- Release date: September 13, 1933 (New York)
- Running time: 85 minutes
- Country: United States
- Language: English

Berkeley Square is a 1933 American pre-Code fantasy drama film produced by Fox Film Corporation, directed by Frank Lloyd, and starring Leslie Howard and Heather Angel. It recounts the tale of young American Peter Standish, played by Howard (nominated for the Academy Award for Best Actor), who, explained by S. T. Joshi, is a "portrayal of a man of the 20th century who somehow merges his personality with that of his 18th-century ancestor". The film was based on the play of the same name by John L. Balderston, itself loosely based on Henry James' incomplete 1917 novel, The Sense of the Past. The play premiered in London in 1926. Howard played Standish in the hugely successful 1929 Broadway production, which he co-produced and co-directed with Gilbert Miller.

The film was thought to have been lost until it was rediscovered in the 1970s. A newly restored 35 mm print has been made, and the restored version was first shown at the 2011 H. P. Lovecraft Film Festival.

== Plot ==
In 1784, shortly after the United States wins its independence, American Peter Standish sails from New York to England to marry his cousin. Upon hearing of a Frenchman crossing the English Channel in a balloon, Peter regrets that he will not be able to see the marvels the future has in store.

In 1933, his descendant, also named Peter Standish, unexpectedly inherits a house in Berkeley Square, London. He becomes increasingly obsessed with his ancestor's diary, causing his fiancée Marjorie Frant great concern. When they have tea with the American ambassador, Peter confides to the diplomat with eager anticipation his conviction that he will be transported back 149 years at 5:30 that day. Peter is convinced that all he needs to do is follow his ancestor's diary, since he already knows what happens, from reading it.

He rushes home, and just as he opens the door, he is indeed back in 1784, taking the place of the earlier Peter Standish just as he arrives at the house, then owned by his relations, the Pettigrews. Lady Ann and her grown offspring Tom, Kate, and Helen are there to greet him. The Pettigrews, being in desperate financial straits, are anxious for Kate to marry the wealthy American. Peter is determined not to alter the future he has read about, until he sees Helen for the first time. He tries to fight his attraction to her, but ultimately fails. Helen, meanwhile, is being pressed by her mother to marry Mr. Throstle, but Helen has determined, even before Peter's arrival, not to marry. She later confesses to Peter that she had been dreaming of him before she saw him.

As time goes on, Peter keeps inadvertently giving offense with his unfamiliarity with 18th century customs. People also begin to fear him, as he blunders and speaks of things which have not yet taken place. For example, when he commissions Sir Joshua Reynolds to paint his portrait, he praises another Reynolds work by name, one the painter has only just begun. Kate becomes convinced that Peter is demonically possessed and breaks their engagement. Helen, however, is sympathetic to his difficulties, and falls in love with him.

Helen eventually presses Peter for an explanation of his "second sight", which he has only hinted at. Though he refuses to speak openly, she somehow sees in his eyes visions of his modern world, with all its horrors as well as its marvels, and guesses the truth. Knowing he has become disillusioned, living among ghosts born 149 years before his time, and desperately unhappy with the day-to-day realities of her era (including a lack of hygiene and plumbing, and not bathing regularly in what he calls a "filthy little pigsty of a world"), she urges him to return to his own time. He wants to stay with her regardless of the consequences, but in the end, he does go back to 1933.

When he visits Helen's grave, he learns that she died on June 15, 1787, at the age of 23. Marjorie comes to see him, worried about his sanity because he has been saying that he is from the 18th century. Peter believes his ancestor had switched places with him. He tells her he cannot marry her. Peter is consoled by the epitaph on Helen's grave, and her conviction that they will be together, "not in my time, nor in yours, but in God's".

== Cast ==
- Leslie Howard as Peter Standish
- Heather Angel as Helen Pettigrew
- Valerie Taylor as Kate Pettigrew
- Irene Browne as Lady Ann Pettigrew
- Beryl Mercer as Mrs. Barwick
- Colin Keith-Johnston as Tom Pettigrew
- Alan Mowbray as Major Clinton
- Juliette Compton as Duchess of Devonshire
- Betty Lawford as Marjorie Frant
- Ferdinand Gottschalk as Mr. Throstle
- Samuel Hinds as The American Ambassador
- Olaf Hytten as Sir Joshua Reynolds
- David Torrence as Lord Stanley

== Reception ==
The film was a box office disappointment for Fox.

The New York Times reviewer Mordaunt Hall called it "an example of delicacy and restraint, a picture filled with gentle humor and appealing pathos." He particularly praised Leslie Howard, writing, "He has done excellent work in other films, but it is doubtful whether he has ever given so impressive and imaginative a performance."

Variety declared the film "an imaginative, beautiful and well-handled production", but predicted that it would not fare well at the American box office because of the very British cast and dialogue.

John Mosher of The New Yorker also praised the film, writing that "the charm that was in the play is there, with Leslie Howard again in his stage role, and with the good, even poetic, lines conserved, and the handsome eighteenth-century London mounted for us with a great deal of taste."

Harrison's Reports wrote: "Artistically and handsomely produced and beautifully acted, 'Berkeley Square' emerges as high-class entertainment for the better class of picture-goers; it is rather slow for the masses."

Leonard Maltin gives this "intriguing fantasy" 3 out of 4 stars.

Berkeley Square was voted one of the ten best pictures of 1934 by Film Daily's annual poll of critics.

== Remake ==
In 1951, 20th Century Fox produced a Technicolor adaptation, with substantial alterations to the plot, as The House in the Square (also known I'll Never Forget You and Man of Two Worlds), starring Tyrone Power and Ann Blyth. Irene Browne reprised her role as Lady Ann Pettigrew in the remake. In the 1933 film, Standish's mistakes in vocabulary and his foreknowledge inspire suspicion and then fear when he at last speaks openly about the future and his disgust for the 18th century. In the 1951 version, Standish is an atomic scientist who ends up being (anachronistically) accused of witchcraft because of his scientific endeavors.

The films end very differently. In the 1933 film, Standish ends his engagement and plans to stay alone in the house in Berkeley Square, awaiting the day when he and Helen will be reunited, "in God's time". In the 1951 film, there is no fiancée. After Standish returns from his journey into the past, he goes to Helen's grave and learns that she died of grief soon after he was taken away to Bedlam. He meets his friend's sister, also played by Ann Blyth, suggesting the possibility that she is Helen, reincarnated.

== See also ==
- List of rediscovered films
