= Why You Lose at Bridge =

Book

- Author: S. J. Simon
- Language: English
- Subject: Contract bridge
- Published: 1945
- Publisher: Nicholson & Watson
- Publication place: United Kingdom
- Pages: iv + 154
- OCLC: 18352804

Cut for Partners
- Author: S. J. Simon
- Language: English
- Subject: Contract bridge
- Published: 1950
- Publisher: Nicholson & Watson
- Publication place: United Kingdom
- Pages: iv + 128
- OCLC: 13548585

Why You Lose at Bridge is a book about the game of contract bridge by the Russian-born English bridge player S. J. "Skid" Simon (1904–48), first published in 1945. It contains practical advice directed mainly towards rubber bridge players and introduces to the world four stereotypical bad players: Mr Smug, the Unlucky Expert, Mrs Guggenheim, and Futile Willie. It has been much admired by duplicate bridge players as well as by rubber bridge players, and Simon's fictional characters have passed into legend.

Cut for Partners, another book by Simon, recounts the further misadventures of his four fictional players. It was published posthumously in 1950.

== Why You Lose at Bridge ==
=== Introduction ===
Simon dedicated the book to the memory of Richard Lederer, his friend and fellow bridge expert. "Portrait" (Simon's title for his preface to his book) exemplifies his style of writing:

You are the ordinary club player.

You have a fair amount of playing ability, which you imagine is greater than it is. A smattering of all the more popular systems. And a pet system of your own (probably a variation of the "Two Club") which you play whenever you manage to cut one of your favourite partners.

Your bidding is adequate and your defence quite shocking.

You have no ambition to become a master player, but you like winning.

You do not keep accounts and tell everybody that you think you are about all square on the year.

You lie - and you know it.

According to Simon, the two primary reasons for losing at bridge are (a) lack of technical skill and (b) losing tactics. Simon claims to address the latter alone, but that is not entirely true: for example, Chapters II and III include sound technical advice on cardplay.

=== Summary of contents ===
The book consists of 12 chapters: I "The Points You Lose 'Ignoring the Odds'", II "The Points You Lose Playing the Dummy", III "The Points You Lose in Defence", IV "The Points You Lose 'Bidding'", V "The Points You Lose NOT Doubling", VI "Your Battlefield", VII "Don't Teach Your Partner", VIII "Half a Loaf", IX "They Can't Fool Me!", X "Fixed - By Palookas!", XI "The Logic of Luck", and XII "A Rubber at the Club".

Chapters I–IV relate mainly to technical aspects of bidding and play. They include some of Simon's better-known aphorisms.

Chapter V discusses the penalty double; whose theory is, according to Simon, the least understood theory in Contract Bridge.

In Chapters VI–VIII, Simon turns to the practicalities of cut-in rubber bridge played for money.

The title of Chapter VIII alludes to the English proverb "Half a loaf is better than no bread". The professional rubber bridge player aims for:

The best result possible. Not the best possible result. [...] And there you have the secret of successful club Bridge – the principle of half-a-loaf or even quarter-of-a-loaf. [...] You must think what is a reasonable result to get on your hand with your present partner.

Chapters IX and X relate to how to counter preemptive and psychic bidding; and to when and when not to use such tactics yourself.

Chapter XI is concerned with the effect which good and bad runs of cards might have on a professional money bridge player's confidence and skill.

In Chapter XII, Simon brings together, and completes, his quartet of fictional bridge players for:

=== A Rubber at the Club ===
In this, the concluding part of Why You Lose at Bridge, Simon describes and analyses a rubber played by his four fictional players: Mr Smug, the Unlucky Expert, Mrs Guggenheim, and Futile Willie. The rubber consists of nine deals, all from actual play. Each deal is shown in full; followed by the auction, with Simon's comments; a narrative description of the play; the players' post mortem, with interjections by Simon; and his calculation of the number of total points chucked away. Every hand exhibits various kinds and degrees of ineptitude; except that in the final one, the Unlucky Expert skilfully executes a dummy reversal and squeeze once played at the table by Jack Marx. The result is a washout: a trivial difference in score, with no winners and no losers.

Simon then rapidly demonstrates how an "ordinary, sound, common-sense player" would have won a 9-, 12-, 14- or 20-point rubber. (Note: In England, rubber bridge is played for a fixed stake per hundred points difference between the total point scores of the two sides, rounding scores of 10–40 down and of 50–90 up to the nearest hundred. Each such hundred is a "point" for scoring purposes; for example, a score difference of 850–940 total points would be a nine point, or nine hundred point, rubber.)

== Cut for Partners ==
Simon's book Cut for Partners is in effect a continuation of the chapter "A Rubber at the Club" in his book Why You Lose at Bridge. It has an Introduction by Terence Reese. The same four fictional characters play three more rubbers (34 deals). No-one ever wants to cut in at their table. Their bidding and play are both believable and ineffective; except that the Unlucky Expert does exhibit his card-playing skill, including one brilliancy. Two deals later, Futile Willie attempts the same brilliancy, on the wrong hand; and it backfires, badly. As before, each deal and auction is shown in full, with Simon's comments; followed by a narrative description of the play and its aftermath; and finally a brief analysis of the result.

== Critical reception and legacy ==
Why You Lose at Bridge has rarely been out of print. Although it is primarily concerned with rubber bridge, it has been much admired by duplicate bridge players for its relevance to that form of the game also.

- 1967 – The Bridge Players' Encyclopedia: a "classic", a book which made "a major contribution to the technical development of the game", and an "optional requirement for a modern technical bridge library".
- 1977 – Terence Reese: "S. J. Simon [...] used fictional characters [...] sharply delineated in a bridge sense."
- 1994 – ACBL poll of well-known players and writers: the best bridge book of all time.
- 1999 – Mark Horton: The Mammoth Book of Bridge, Bridge Books You Should Read – Classics, Entertainment.
- 2004 – British Bridge Almanack: one of the 16 books by British authors deemed to have made a significant contribution to the development of the game; and the second most mentioned by respondents to a survey.
- 2007 – ACBL survey of "experts": second favourite book of all time.
- 2007 – ACBL survey of "other readers": fourth favourite book of all time.
- 2011 – The Official Encyclopedia of Bridge: recommended books.

Cut for Partners has been reprinted.
