= Happy with Either =

1948 play

- Written by: Margaret Kennedy
- Original language: English
- Genre: Comedy

Premiere
- Date premiered: 22 April 1948
- Place premiered: St James's Theatre, London

Happy with Either is a 1948 comedy play by the British writer Margaret Kennedy. Best known as a novelist, it was her last play. It ran for 35 performances at St James's Theatre in London's West End between 22 April and 22 May 1948. The original cast included Cyril Raymond, Wilfrid Hyde-White, Adrienne Corri, Valerie Taylor, Angela Baddeley and Constance Cummings. It was produced by Basil Dean. The plot revolves around a bigamist who is allowed back into the lives of his two wives because they miss him.

== Bibliography ==
- Gale, Maggie. West End Women: Women and the London stage, 1918-1962. Routledge, 1996.
- Vinson, James. Twentieth-Century Romance and Gothic Writers. Macmillan, 1982.
- Wearing, J.P. The London Stage 1950-1959: A Calendar of Productions, Performers, and Personnel. Rowman & Littlefield, 2014.
