= The Ivory Door =

1927 play by A. A. Milne

The Ivory Door is a three-act play by A. A. Milne. It is set in a fictional castle and the surrounding countryside.

== Background ==
Milne, though he had written dozens of plays and screenplays through the 1910s and 1920s, had become best known by far for his Winnie-the-Pooh stories. He was conflicted about his success, and in the introduction to The Ivory Door, he lamented what he perceived to be his new reputation for "whimsy": "I have the Whimsical label so firmly round my own neck that I can neither escape from it nor focus it... it seems to me now that if I write anything less realistic, less straightforward than 'The cat sat on the mat,' I am 'indulging in a whimsy.'"

The Ivory Door premiered on Broadway on October 18, 1927 at the Punch and Judy Theater (later the Charles Hopkins Theatre), starring Henry Hull, Louise Closser Hale, and Donald Meek. The production ran for 39 weeks and 310 performances. The costumes were designed by Helene Pons.

The Ivory Door was later produced at the Haymarket Theater on April 17, 1929, starring Angela Baddeley, Rosina Filippi, C. M. Lowne, Sam Livesey, and Francis Lister. However, the play closed after only 20 performances.

The play received mixed reviews. The New Yorker panned the New York production as "a lethal combination of whimsy and lethargy." The New Statesman praised the plot as "extraordinarily worked out," particularly the "pure dramatic innovation" of the final act. A critic for The New Age wrote: "What Mr. A. A. Milne does well, it must be agreed, he does supremely well. But he is not a dramatist." Milne was distraught at the poor reception of a play he was particularly fond of, writing: "The Ivory Door is damned and slammed not by the public but by the critics."

== Plot ==
=== First Act ===
The first act (a prelude) has the old king working alone in his private room when his young son, Perivale, enters. After the two discuss such subjects as love, marriage, governing the kingdom, and the inevitability of death, the conversation turns to a door behind a tapestry. Perivale says there are rumors that anyone who walks through the ivory door will be killed by the demons in the passage inside. The king says that he does not know whether that is true or false, because he has never been through the door and does not know anyone who has. He shows Perivale the door and warns his son to not tamper with things beyond his understanding when he becomes king.

=== Second Act ===
Perivale, now a young man who has been crowned king upon his father's death, frets over his upcoming marriage to Princess Lilia, the daughter of a king from a nearby land. His sergeant-at-arms Brand comforts him, saying it is natural to be nervous about a marriage to a woman he has never met, and suggesting he should do something to distract himself. King Perivale decides to go through the ivory door, and Brand reluctantly agrees to the plan, but only after Perivale agrees to return within three hours or be declared dead.

Behind the door, Perivale finds a tunnel. His clothes become dirty and torn as he walks through the tunnel, but he is not otherwise injured. He emerges into bright sunlight beside a nearby river, and decides to walk back overland to the castle. Along the way, he is distracted by mummers who are traveling to the castle to perform at the upcoming wedding. Then Perivale hears the alarm bells from the castle and a crier announcing the death of the king. He returns to the castle but is not recognized because his clothes are torn and soiled. When he claims to be the King, he is called an impostor. He protests that he went through the tunnel behind the ivory door, but Brand calls him a "demon" and orders his arrest.

Princess Lilia confronts Brand and demands to know why the king was arrested. Brand says that it was not the king, but rather a demon who had emerged from behind the ivory door to impersonate the king and lead the kingdom astray. Lilia is convinced that the stories about the ivory door are nonsense and before Brand can stop her, she opens the door and walks through.

=== Third Act ===
Lilia, now dirty and wearing torn clothing, is thrown into Perivale's dungeon cell. They do not recognize each other, as they have never met, but soon realize that they are the king and his betrothed. They are eventually let out of the cell, and taken to the throne room, where Brand is standing before a large crowd. Brand accuses Lilia and Perivale of being demons, and Perivale insists that there is nothing behind the ivory door but a very ordinary passage. No one listens to him.

Eventually, Brand speaks with Perivale and Lilia privately. He tells them that he knows who they are, but the people's fear of the ivory door is too great to allow them to believe that there was really nothing there all along; they believe in the demons and want to kill them. Perivale protests that he knows there are no demons because he didn't see any when he went through the passage. "Do not take our stories away!" is Brand's response.

Brand says he will do what he can to save Perivale and Lilia's lives, but they will have to leave and never come back. Lillia protests that she is a princess and knows nothing of survival and Perivale is likely no better; Brand says that he is sure they will find a way because they have seen the truth. Perivale says that at least he and Lillia will be together, but his words ring hollow because, as Lilia points out, they only just met that day and if they aren't getting married for politics, they should see if they like each other before getting married. Brand assumes the mantle of Protector of the Kingdom and orders the "demons" exiled.

Some productions include an epilogue, in which an old man wearing a king's crown listens to a young boy ask whether the stories about how Baram the Great defended the kingdom from demons are true.

== Allegorical Import ==
In one interpretation, the play is an overt criticism of religious dogma, in which Perivale and Lilia are presented as heroic figures who learn the truth about myth and legend. Milne encourages the audience to look at their own religions as a set of mythological stories no more to be believed than the stories about the demons living behind the ivory door in Perivale's kingdom. Left open to audience is debate is the matter of whether Brand is a hero also, for keeping the peace and maintaining the status quo, or a villain for perpetuating a lie, however well-intentioned it might have been. Also left open to interpretation is the role that mythologies and other factually inaccurate stories play in a society.
