= Les Pavés du Ciel =

French-language play by Albert Husson

Les Pavés du Ciel ('The Pavements of Heaven') is a French-language play in two acts by Albert Husson. It premiered in 1953 and was translated into English for Brodway by an uncredited writer as The Heavenly Twins. The 1955 New York production was nominated for the Tony Award for Best Costume Design. A 1979 production was filmed for broadcast on French television.

== Plot ==
(Taken from the Broadway version)
Shots are heard by the audience before the curtain rises. When the stage is revealed, Henri appears to be dead with his wife Lucile Miremont, in a striking white satin gown, holding a gun over the corpse. Lucille targeted Henri for cheating on her. Henri surprisingly springs to life, as the bullets were blanks. A strange absurd comedy ensues, including Lucile reloading her weapon with real bullets, shooting Henri a second time, and resulting in Henri transforming into a grandfather clock. A further plot point involves Lucile Nicole unsuccessfully trying to seduce Pierre, Henri's married son. In the end Lucille awakes to discover the events were all a nightmare.

== History ==
Les Pavés du Ciel premiered at the Théâtre des Célestins in Lyon, France on November 19, 1953. The production used sets by Francine Galliard Risler and starred Jean-Pierre Aumont.

Critic Robert Kemp stated in his review in Le Monde, "Christmas is not far off. Mr. Albert Husson offers us a mechanical toy—a luxury toy, terribly complicated; one in which the inventor himself keeps pinching his fingers. It gets off to a promising start. And yet, one immediately discerns a desire to astonish, to bewilder."

Les Pavés du Ciel was adapted into the English language by an uncredited writer as The Heavenly Twins for a production at the Booth Theatre where it opened on November 4, 1955. It ran for 35 performances; closing on December 3, 1955. Prior to its Broadway run it ran at the National Theatre in Washington, D.C. The production was directed by Cyril Ritchard, produced by the Theatre Guild, used sets by Eldon Elder, and costumes by Helene Pons.

Pons was nominated for the Tony Award for Best Costume Design at the 10th Tony Awards held in 1956. The Broadway cast included Jean-Pierre Aumont from the French production as Pierre Belcourt and Henri, Gaby Rodgers as Nicole Belcourt, Faye Emerson as Lucile Miremont, Drew Thompson as Philippe Ploquin, Marcel Hillaire as The Old Man, Earl Montgomery as Police Inspector Mourel, and Lucille Patton as Marie.

A production of the play was filmed for the French television program Au théâtre ce soir, and broadcast by Office de Radiodiffusion Télévision Française on May 11, 1979.
