= I'll Never Forget You (film) =

1951 film by Roy Ward Baker

The House in the Square
- American theatrical release poster
- Directed by: Roy Ward Baker
- Written by: Ranald MacDougall
- Based on: Berkeley Square; 1926 play by John L. Balderston
- Produced by: Sol C. Siegel
- Starring: Tyrone Power; Ann Blyth
- Cinematography: Georges Périnal
- Edited by: Alan Osbiston
- Music by: William Alwyn
- Distributed by: Twentieth Century Fox
- Release date: 7 December 1951 (US)
- Running time: 90 minutes
- Country: United Kingdom
- Language: English
- Box office: $1.75 million (US/Canada rentals)

The House in the Square (also titled I'll Never Forget You in the United States and Man of Two Worlds) is a 1951 science fiction fantasy film starring Tyrone Power and Ann Blyth. It was an early film for director Roy Ward Baker.

Power plays Peter Standish, an American atomic scientist who is transported to the 18th century, where he falls in love. It was adapted from the 1926 play Berkeley Square by John L. Balderston, which was also the basis of the 1933 film Berkeley Square. Irene Browne reprised her role as Lady Anne Pettigrew from the 1933 version.

It used a similar technique to the 1939 film The Wizard of Oz, presenting the reality of the opening and closing sequences in black-and-white, and the fantasy sequence of the film in Technicolor.

== Plot ==
Peter Standish is an American atomic scientist who is working in a nuclear laboratory in London. His co-worker Roger Forsyth, who is worried about Peter's lack of social activities, drives him to the house in Berkeley Square that Peter inherited. It is there that Peter announces his wishes of living in the 18th century among the high-class family Pettigrew he has studied over the last years. Because of a lightning strike, he is brought back to 1784, where he is thought to be the first Peter Standish, the American cousin of the Pettigrews who, according to history, will soon romance and marry Kate Pettigrew.

Peter falls for Kate, but he is more interested in her sister Helen, of whom he has never found any records. Over the next few days, Peter makes several bad impressions on the family by using modern-day language and revealing information he could not have known if he had actually grown up in the 18th century. Helen, however, is the only one not suspicious of Peter's presence and falls in love with him as well. Peter admits to her that the 18th century is not what he thought it would be. The narrow-minded people, the poverty and the dirt irritate him. Furthermore, he admits that he is from the future and shows Helen his hidden laboratory in the basement with modern inventions.

Rather than being afraid, Helen becomes even more interested in Peter. They fall in love, despite Peter's awareness that he has to marry Kate in order to not change history. Helen begs him not to say things which make him look odd, and that night, at a formal party, Peter tries to impress the famous Duchess of Devonshire, but he accidentally talks about her as if he is talking about her legacy, which makes her uneasy. Kate is fed up with Peter and announces that she will not marry him. Rather than trying to court her somehow, Peter is drawn to Helen, who is interested in finding out more about the future.

Things start to look bad for Peter when his laboratory is uncovered. He is committed to the Bethlem Royal Hospital. Before being taken away, he rushes to Helen's room, where she places a crux ansata to remind him of her love for him. While he is being taken away, lightning strikes again and Peter returns to the present. There, Forsyth tells him he has been acting like a madman for the past seven weeks. Peter is shocked when he meets Forsyth's sister Martha, who resembles Helen. He rushes out to the graveyard near his house, where he not only discovers Helen's grave, but that she died of grief shortly after he was taken away to the asylum.

== Cast ==
- Tyrone Power as Peter Standish
- Ann Blyth as Helen Pettigrew / Martha Forsyth
- Michael Rennie as Roger Forsyth
- Dennis Price as Tom Pettigrew
- Beatrice Campbell as Kate Pettigrew
- Kathleen Byron as the Duchess of Devonshire
- Raymond Huntley as Mr. Throstle
- Irene Browne as Lady Anne Pettigrew

== Production ==
The film went into production in January 1945, with Gregory Peck and Maureen O'Hara in the lead roles. The project, however, was shelved and eventually abandoned, before it was taken up in 1950. On 13 July 1950, Tyrone Power was announced in the lead role. French actress Micheline Presle was originally set to co-star, but she dropped out in March 1951 due to illness. Constance Smith shortly stepped in as her replacement, but producer Darryl F. Zanuck decided she was not experienced enough and replaced her with Ann Blyth.

Initially, Jean Simmons was approached to co-star next to Power.

== Critical reception ==
Bosley Crowther of The New York Times wrote "Although there are obvious intimations of the lovely play, Berkeley Square, in the movie I'll Never Forget You, which came to the Roxy yesterday, there is little of its poetry or magic," and dismissed the film as "a thoroughly unmemorable event". Similarly, TV Guide wrote "It's a terrific story but less than a terrific film. Power is given little opportunity to show any of his humor and the entire mood of the film is lethargic and a bit sombre". However, Allmovie called it "A fairly haunting, if a bit slow romance"; and Mystery File wrote "It may seem at best a rather tired fantasy to you, and that’s fine. But if you let it, the film has a charm all its own."

== Home media ==
The film was released on DVD as part of the Tyrone Power Matinee Idol Collection on 29 July 2008.

== See also ==
- 1951 in film
- List of science fiction films of the 1950s
