= The Wind of Heaven =

1945 play written by Emlyn Williams

- Original language: English
- Written by: Emlyn Williams
- Genre: Drama

Premiere
- Date: 19 February 1945
- Place: King's Theatre, Glasgow

The Wind of Heaven is a 1945 play by the British writer Emlyn Williams.

It was first performed at the King's Theatre, Glasgow before transferring to the St James's Theatre in London's West End where it ran for 264 performances between 12 April and 1 December 1945. The original London cast included Diana Wynyard, Valerie Taylor, Megs Jenkins, Emlyn Williams, Arthur Hambling, Herbert Lomas and Barbara Couper.

== Bibliography ==
- Wearing, J.P. The London Stage 1940-1949: A Calendar of Productions, Performers, and Personnel. Rowman & Littlefield, 2014.
