= The Primrose Path (Buckner and Hart) =

The Primrose Path is a play by Robert Buckner and Walter Hart. A black comedy, the plot focuses on an impoverished Wallace family living just outside of Buffalo, New York who make ends meet through prostitution and robbery. It had a considerable amount of foul language in comparison to other plays of its period. It premiered on December 26, 1938, at the Maryland Theater in Baltimore, Maryland. It transferred to Broadway's Biltmore Theatre where it opened on Jan 4, 1939. While it received some of most scathing reviews from the New York critics in the 1938-1939 Broadway season, it had a successful run and was a commercial success.

Produced and directed by George Abbott, the production used sets designed by the firm Cirker & Robbins and costumes designed by Helene Pons. The cast included Leslie Barrett as Davy Wallace, Marilyn Erskine as Eva Wallace, Betty Field as Clare Wallace, Florida Friebus as Maggie Wallace, Betty Garde as Emma Wallace, Philip Wood as Homer Wallace, Helen Westley as Grandma, Russell Hardie as Bayard Lawrence, Clyde Fillmore as Augustus Cummings, and Teresa Dale as the prison matron.
