= The Elephant is White =

1939 novel

- First US edition
- Author: Caryl Brahms; S.J. Simon
- Language: English
- Genre: Comedy
- Publisher: Michael Joseph (UK); Farrar & Rinehart (US)
- Publication date: 1939
- Publication place: United Kingdom
- Media type: Print

The Elephant is White is a 1939 comedy novel by Caryl Brahms and S.J. Simon, a regular writing team between 1937 and 1950. In prewar Paris an idle Englishman runs into a group of eccentric Russian exiles in a nightclub.

== Film adaptation ==
In 1944 it was adapted into the film Give Us the Moon directed by Val Guest and starring Margaret Lockwood, Vic Oliver and Roland Culver. The film updated the plot into a future postwar era.

== Bibliography ==
- Goble, Alan. The Complete Index to Literary Sources in Film. Walter de Gruyter, 1999.
