= Berkeley Square (play) =

Play by John L. Balderston

- Original language: English
- Written by: John L. Balderston
- Based on: The Sense of the Past by Henry James

Premiere
- Date: 1926
- Place: St Martin's Theatre

Berkeley Square is a play in three acts by John L. Balderston (in collaboration with J. C. Squire) which tells the story of a young American who is transported back to London in the time of the American Revolution and meets his ancestors. The plot is loosely based on Henry James' posthumous 1917 novel The Sense of the Past.

The play premiered at the St Martin's Theatre in London's West End in 1926, where it ran for 179 performances. Its production on Broadway in 1929 was an enormous success with Leslie Howard (who also co-produced and co-directed the play with Gilbert Miller) in the role of time traveler Peter Standish and ran for 229 performances, a substantial run for its time. The costumes were designed by Helene Pons and B. J. Simmons & Co.

The play was later adapted into a 1933 film version with Howard repeating his stage role of Peter Standish, winning him an Academy Award nomination. The play was also produced for a 1959 BBC television production and the 1951 film The House in the Square (released in the United States as I'll Never Forget You). Burton Lane and Alan Jay Lerner adapted the basic plot for their 1965 musical, On a Clear Day You Can See Forever.

== Original London cast ==
- Tom Pettigrew – Brian Gilmour
- Mr. Throstle – Ivor Barnard
- The Ambassador – J. Fisher White
- Peter Standish – Lawrence Anderson
- Maid – Jane Millican/Edith Martyn
- Lady Anne Pettigrew – Beatrice Wilson/Georgina Wynter
- Miss Pettigrew – Valerie Taylor
- Helen Pettigrew – Jean Forbes-Robertson
- Mrs. Barwick – Frances Ruttledge
- Marjorie Frant – Grizelda Hervey/Juliet Mansell/Jane Millican

== Original Broadway cast ==
- Mrs. Barwick – Lucy Beaumont
- Miss Barrymore – June English
- Marjorie Frant – Ann Freshman
- Helen Pettigrew – Margalo Gillmore
- Tom Pettigrew – Brian Gilmour
- H. R. H. The Duke of Cumberland – Robert Greig
- Maid – Irene Howard
- Peter Standish – Leslie Howard
- The Lady Anne Pettigrew – Alice John
- Mr. Throstle – Tarver Penna
- The Duchess of Devonshire – Louise Prussing
- Major Clinton – Charles Romano
- Kate Pettigrew – Valerie Taylor
- Lord Stanley – Henry Warwick
- The Ambassador – Fritz Williams
