= Prelude to Exile =

Prelude to Exile is a 1936 American play by William J. McNally.
