= Ernest de Weerth =

Ernest de Weerth (21 August 1894 - 28 March 1967) was a Paris-born set and costume designer for the American theatre.

== Early life and family ==
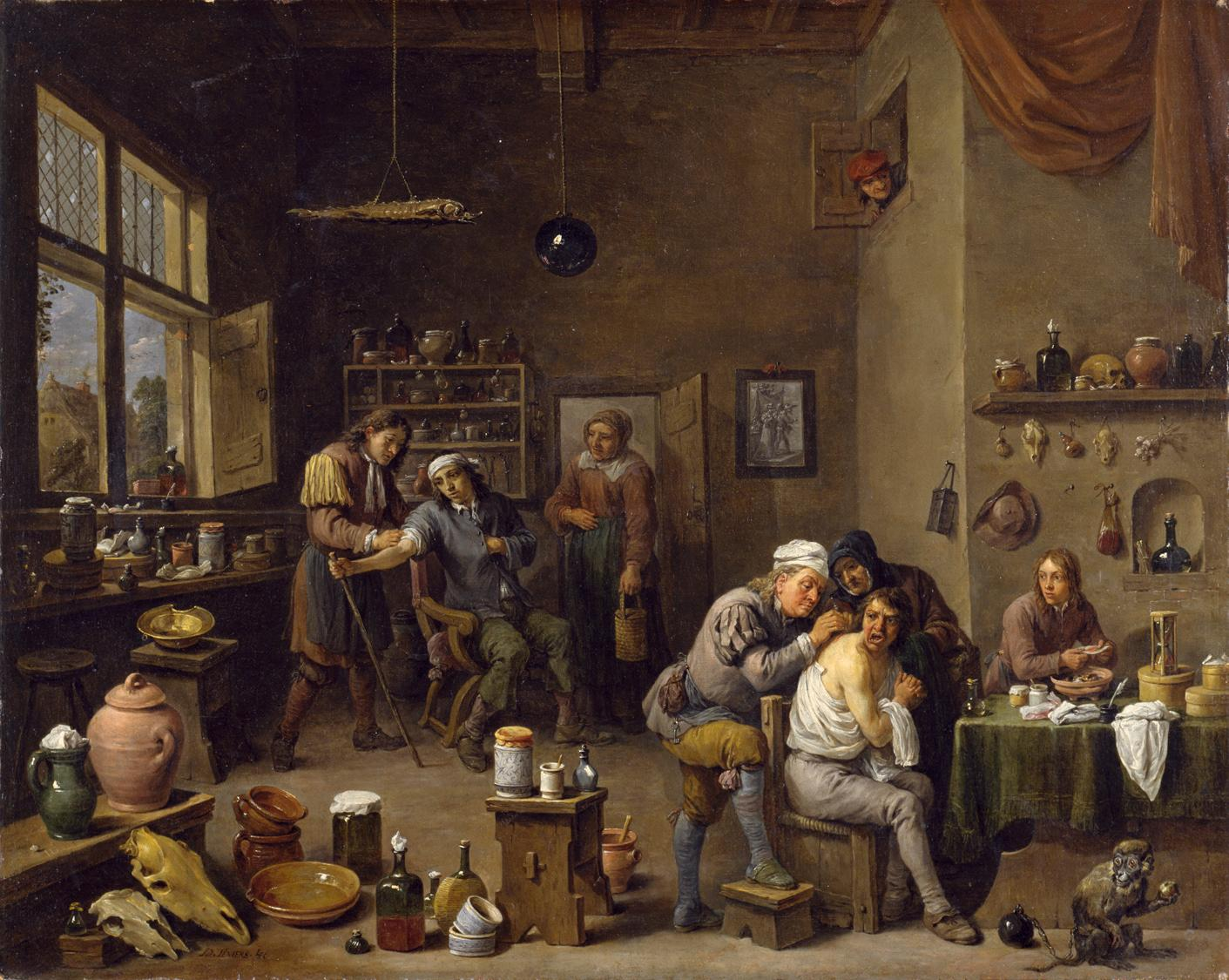
The Surgeon, David Teniers the Younger, 1670s. Oil on canvas, Chrysler Museum of Art, Norfolk, Virginia. Formerly in ownership of Ernest de Weerth.

Ernest de Weerth was born in Paris on 21 August 1894 to Helene de Weerth, formerly Helene Baltzell of Baltimore, who after marrying a Belgian, Ernest De Weerth Snr., lived most of her life in Europe. She was known for the salon she hosted at her home in Paris near the Place de l'Opera. After her death in 1932, her son Ernest donated a collection of her 17th century Dutch and German paintings to the Baltimore Museum of Art where it is known as the Ernest de Weerth Collection.

== Career ==
De Weerth started his theatrical career as an assistant stage manager at the Neighborhood Playhouse but quickly moved into set and costume design. He created costumes for Mary Garden and Max Reinhardt. In 1927 he devised four settings for Dan Totheroh's staging of Salome.

In the late 1930s he made an offer on behalf of Italian dictator Benito Mussolini to buy Norman Bel Geddes' designs for his Streamlined Ocean Liner.

In his later career he wrote reviews for Opera News.

== Death and legacy ==
He died in Rome on 28 March 1967 and is buried there at the Campo Verano cemetery.
