= Trottie True =

1949 British film by Brian Desmond Hurst

- Theatrical release poster
- Directed by: Brian Desmond Hurst
- Written by: Denis Freeman
- Based on: a novel by S. J. Simon and Caryl Brahms
- Produced by: Hugh Stewart
- Starring: Jean Kent; James Donald; Hugh Sinclair
- Cinematography: Harry Waxman
- Edited by: Ralph Kemplen
- Music by: Benjamin Frankel
- Production company: Two Cities Films
- Distributed by: General Film Distributors (UK); Eagle-Lion Films (US)
- Release date: 9 August 1949 (London)
- Running time: 96 minutes
- Country: United Kingdom
- Language: English

Trottie True (U.S. title: The Gay Lady) is a 1949 British musical comedy film directed by Brian Desmond Hurst and starring Jean Kent, James Donald and Hugh Sinclair. It is a rare British Technicolor film of the period.

== Premise ==
Trottie True is a Gaiety Girl of the 1890s who, following a brief romance with a balloonist, marries Lord Digby Landon, becoming Duchess of Wellwater when he succeeds to the dukedom. Her music hall background delights the staff, but does not, at first, please her aristocratic in-laws. But after complimenting Trottie upon doing what she likes, rather than obeying convention, Lady Drinkwater calls her a "true aristocrat".

Digby agrees to lunch with the Marquess of Maidenhead at Romanoff's, and to be the escort of Ruby Rubato (another chorus girl), merely so the married Marquess can philander with another. But Trottie is also dining there, with an old beau, having invited him after they innocently met in Hyde Park, London, after years of separation. Upon seeing each other, Digby and Trottie both believe they have discovered the other in an assignation, as the Marquess has failed to arrive, leaving Digby and Rubato alone.

The film is set as Trottie looks back over her past, whilst staring out of a window at a wedding, and pondering her future.

== Cast ==
- Jean Kent as Trottie True
- James Donald as Lord Digby Landon (later Duke of Wellwater)
- Hugh Sinclair as Maurice Beckenham
- Lana Morris as Bouncie Barrington
- Andrew Crawford as Sid Skinner, the balloonist
- Bill Owen as Joe Jugg
- Michael Medwin as Marquis of Maidenhead
- Joan Young as Mrs True
- Harold Scott as Mr True
- Tony Halfpenny as Perce True
- Daphne Anderson as Bertha True
- Katherine Blake as Ruby Rubato
- Philip Strange as Earl of Burney
- Darcy Conyers as Claude
- Josef Ramart as Monty's chauffeur (uncredited) (Jean Kent's real-life husband, since 1946)
- Francis de Wolff as George Edwardes
- Campbell Cotts as Saintsbury, the butler
- Harcourt Williams as Duke of Wellwater (Digby's father)
- Mary Hinton as Duchess of Wellwater (Digby's mother)
- Christopher Lee as Hon. Bongo Icklesham
- Roger Moore as stage door Johnny (uncredited)
- Hattie Jacques as Daisy Delaware, a Gaiety girl
- Ian Carmichael as postman (uncredited)
- Patrick Cargill as a party guest (uncredited)
- Sam Kydd as Bedford stage manager (uncredited)

== Production ==
The film is based on a novel by Caryl Brahms and S. J. Simon, published in 1946. Hugh Stewart read the book at the suggestion of Dennis Freeman and succeeded in setting up the project at Rank.

The musical comedy was directed by Brian Desmond Hurst.

The exterior shots of the mansion are of Stowe House. Producer Hugh Stewart read the story when he was recovering from jaundice. He bought the film rights and tried to finance the film through MGM, with which he had a contract. MGM did not want to make the film, but Stewart got it financed at Two Cities. MGM loaned Stewart to Two Cities to produce the film.

Stewart said that several directors were considered, including Harold French, before Brian Desmond Hurst was chosen. Anthony Steel made one of his earliest film appearances in Trottie True.

Jean Kent called it her "favourite film. And Harry Waxman was a marvellous cameraman. They weren't good with the music, though. I had a battle about that." She continued:

We were scheduled to start and I hadn't heard a word about the music, so I rang up whoever was the head of Two Cities... I finally managed to get half the music done and then I had another argument about the first number. It dissolves from the brown-eyed young Trottie to the hazel-eyed big Trotttie, which was hysterical. They wanted me to sing something in schottische... I said, "It's a very nice number but I come from the music halls and I tell you you cannot use a schottische at this point." So he [the music director] changed it to 6/8 time.

Kent said she had to prevent the filmmakers from cutting away from her singing, "which they used to be very fond of, in British films. The whole point of somebody singing the song is for the audience in the cinema, not the people in the movie. So I had to devise ways to keep moving all the time so they couldn't get the scissors in, particularly during the Marie Lloyd number in the ballroom scene after I'd become the duchess."

Stewart helped cast James Donald in the lead.

Because he was this rather dour Scot, I played him as the um ... young stage-door Johnnie duke who was after Trottie. And however much you could see he was after her for one thing, you could believe also there was an interior integrity about him because of this Scotchness of his, and you could believe that he would eventually propose to her and she would become the Duchess. And James Donald's performance and personality was extremely important for that and really believable.

Production of the film was interrupted by a crew members' strike in protest over recent sackings of film workers. Three and a half days of filming were lost due to the strike, but it was completed on schedule.

== Release ==
The film was released in the United States by Eagle-Lion as The Gay Lady.

=== Box office ===
Trade papers called the film a "notable box office attraction" in British cinemas in 1949.

=== Critical reception ===
The New York Times described the film as "the professional and romantic rise of Trottie True as depicted in The Gay Lady, which arrived from England at the Sixtieth Street Trans-Lux on Saturday. But this Technicolored rags to riches ascent, which is interlarded with song and dance turns, is something less than original and rarely sprightly. Trottie True's tale is an old one and it hasn't worn well with the years."

Leonard Maltin rated the film two and a half out of four stars, and called it a "lightweight costume picture ... most notable aspect of film is its stunning use of Technicolor. Look fast for Christopher Lee as a dapper stage-door Johnnie."

The New York Times called it "a typical Gay nineties success story" that "amuses but never convulses the reader."

According to BFI Screenonline, "British 1940s Technicolor films offer an abundance of visual pleasures, especially when lovingly restored by the National Film Archive. Trottie True is not among the best known, but comes beautifully packaged, gift wrapped with all the trimmings."
