= B. J. Simmons & Co. =

London costumier

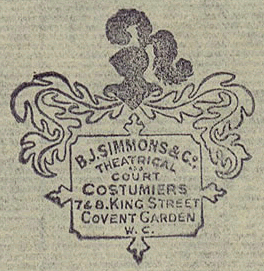
B. J. Simmons & Co. Stamp

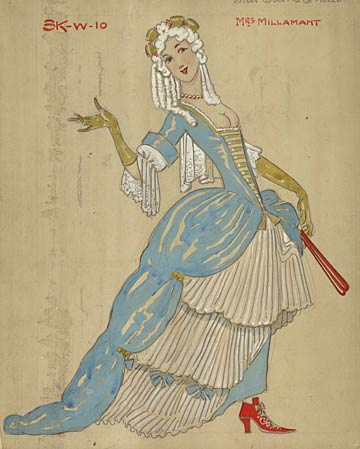
Edith Evans as Mrs. Millamant in "The Way of the World"

B. J. Simmons & Co. was a London costumier famous for sophisticated designs, high quality, and correctness of period of costumes. Founded in 1875 by B. J. Simmons, the business continued to be operated by his family until the 1930s. During that time, it was known under various different titles such as: B. J. Simmons, J. B. Simmons, John Simmons & Son/Sons, Simmons/Symmons/Simmonds Brothers, G. B. Simmons, and B. & G. Simmons. Until 1922, the London newspapers and The London Stage had the costumier listed under the name of “John Simmons”. Their workshop was located in Covent Garden in London, a creative centre of London theatre. Between 1890 and 1899, Simmons costumed at least 42 theatre productions and by the end of the 1930s they had provided costumes for as many as 20 stage productions per year. Therefore, before ending operations in 1964, they had created the costumes for around 1,200 stage and film productions.

Simmons & Co. were best known for their historical costume designs. English actor and theatre manager Herbert Beerbohm Tree often commissioned them for historical costumes during his famous staging productions of Shakespeare. Nevertheless, Simmons & Co.'s output was very diverse: they supplied costumes for a range of different types of shows and were the main costume producers for London Film Productions and J. Arthur Rank. In addition, they conducted non-theatrical trade, such as creating hundreds of officers' hats for the Ethiopian army in 1947.

When competitor Charles H. Fox was commissioned and contracted by the British army to supply costumes for the Entertainments National Service Association in 1940, Simmons & Co. fell into a financial crisis. Fox's financial partner, theatrical publisher Samuel French Ltd, provided funds to purchase the company in 1941. Simmons & Co. continued to run as a separate concern from Fox's ownership and was kept alive due to the interest in company from French's president, Cyril Hogg. After Hogg's death, Simmons & Co. ceased to make profit and the costumier officially ended operations in 1964. The collection, which in 1936 was reported to contain 80,000 items, was sold in the early 1980s after Fox bought French's interest in Simmons. Later purchases have been reported to have happened in 2007.
