= 50 Berkeley Square =

Townhouse in Central London, England

Coordinates: 51°30′31.8″N 0°8′45.1″W

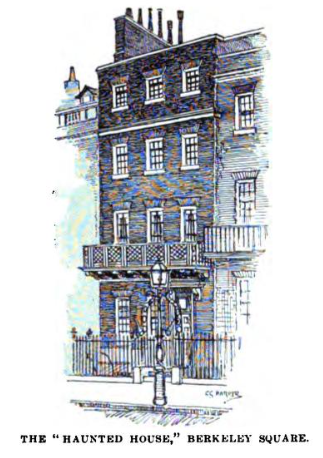

50 Berkeley Square is a Grade II listed building and a reportedly haunted townhouse on Berkeley Square in Mayfair, Central London. It became widely known as the most haunted house during the late 19th century and was the former home of British Prime Minister George Canning.

== Legend ==
The legend about the house varies, but most versions state that the attic room of the house is haunted by the spirit of a young woman. In a desperate attempt to escape from her abusive uncle, she had thrown herself from the top floor window. Her spirit is said to take the form of a brown mist, though sometimes it is reported as a white figure and is capable of frightening people to death. A rarer version of the tale is that a young man was locked in the attic room, fed only through a hole in the door, until he eventually went mad and died. Another story is that the attic room is haunted by the ghost of a little girl who was murdered there by a sadistic servant.

For around fifteen years, Thomas Myers was the occupant of 50 Berkeley Square from 1859 until November of 1874. He was rumoured to have been turned down by his fiancée. From then on, he had lived alone and it was said that he locked himself inside refusing to ever leave and slowly descended into madness until he died. During his residence, the home had fallen into gross disrepair and its reputation began to develop.

It is alleged that in 1872, on a bet, Lord Lyttleton stayed a night in the building's attic. He brought his shotgun with him and fired at an apparition. In the morning he attempted to find the apparition, but could only find shotgun cartridges. The following year the local council issued a summons to the house's owners for failure to pay taxes, but it is claimed that they were not prosecuted because of the house's reputation for being haunted.

In 1879 a piece in the Mayfair Magazine alleged that a maid who stayed in the attic room had been found mad and had died in an asylum the day after. It was also alleged that after a nobleman spent the night in the attic room he was so paralyzed with fear that he could not speak.

In 1887 it was alleged that two sailors from HMS Penelope stayed a night in the house. By morning one was found dead, having tripped as he ran from the house. The other reported having seen the ghost of Myers approaching them aggressively.

Modern interest in the site was spurred by its inclusion in Peter Underwood's book Haunted London (1975).

No phenomena have been reported since the house was bought by the Maggs Brothers in the late 1930s and, though many contemporary media outlets have reported happenings at the house, more recent investigators claim that nothing unusual has ever taken place there. They remark that events in Edward Bulwer-Lytton's story "The Haunted and the Haunters" bear a remarkable resemblance to the supposed hauntings at 50 Berkeley Square.

== Sceptical reception ==
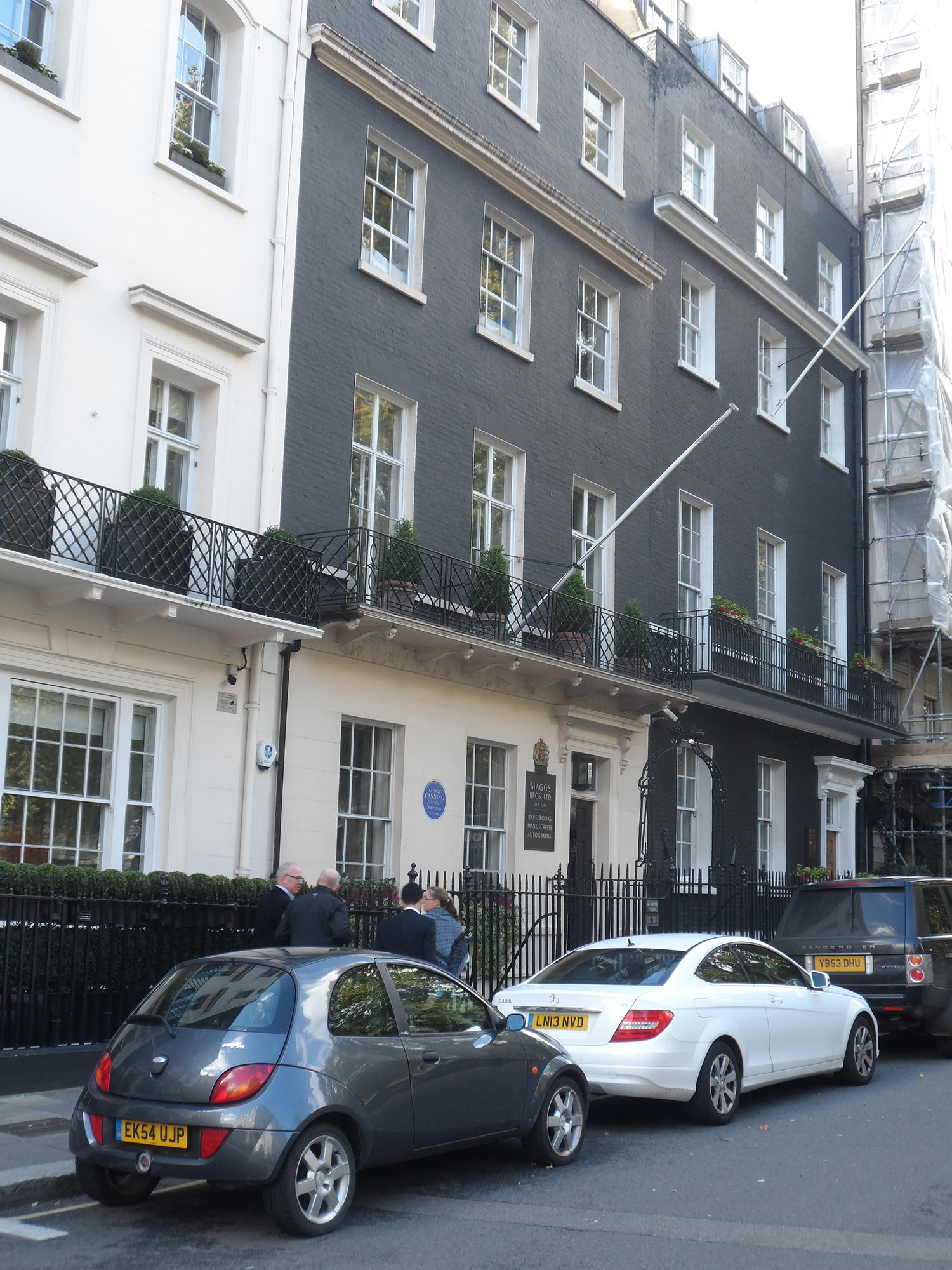
50 Berkeley Square today

There were three sets of correspondence about 50 Berkeley Square in the journal Notes and Queries, in 1872–73, 1879 and 1880–81. A common conclusion was that the neglect of the house had inspired the imaginative stories about hauntings.

In her autobiography, published in 1906, Lady Dorothy Nevill stated that Mr Myers was a relative of hers. After he had lost his fiancée his behaviour "bordered upon lunacy" and he stayed in the house all day, becoming active at night, when he rambled about, making strange sounds. According to Nevill, the "old house would occasionally appear to be lit up at the dead of night". She considered that Myers's nocturnal activities had been misinterpreted by others as evidence of a ghost. She concluded that the haunting had no factual basis and that the "whole story was nonsense".

Modern researchers have suggested that the house was never haunted and that many of the stories were either exaggerated or invented by later writers. For example, the claim that sailors entered the house in the 1870s was invented by Elliott O'Donnell and there is no evidence to confirm any part of the story.
