= S. J. Simon =

British journalist, writer and bridge player (1904–1948)

Simon Jacoblivitch Skidelsky (Russian: Семён Яковлевич Скидельский; 4 July 1904 – 27 July 1948), also known as S. J. "Skid" Simon, Seca Jascha Skidelsky, and Simon Jasha Skidelsky, was a British journalist, fiction writer and bridge player. From 1937 until his death, he collaborated with Caryl Brahms on a series of comic novels and short stories, mostly with a background of ballet or of English history. As a bridge expert, he was jointly responsible for developing the Acol system of bidding.

== Life and works ==
Simon was born in Harbin, Manchuria. A member of a Russian-Jewish merchant family from Vladivostok, he left Russia when he was young. He had at least three brothers, Boris, Grigory and Mikhail. Simon's nephew is economic historian Robert Skidelsky, Boris' son. He became a British citizen in February 1931.

He was educated at Tonbridge School in England and the University of London. In the 1920s he was studying forestry, when he met Caryl Brahms, who recruited him to help her write the captions for "Musso, the home page dog", a daily series of satirical cartoons drawn by David Low in The Evening Standard.

=== Fiction ===
From 1937 to 1950, Brahms and Simon collaborated on a series of comic novels, eleven published by Michael Joseph. The first was A Bullet in the Ballet, which introduced the phlegmatic Inspector Adam Quill and the eccentric members of Vladimir Stroganoff's ballet company. The book originated in what Simon supposed to be a momentary fantasy on the part of Brahms; she was enjoying deputising for the leading ballet critic Arnold Haskell, and over coffee she and Simon dreamt up an impromptu ballet murder mystery with Haskell as the victim. They developed this idea into a novel in which the Ballet Stroganoff is stalked by a murderer. Brahms later recalled their collaboration:

It was like a long, laughing, wrangling conversation with both of us jumping on one another. ... We would speak lines to each other – we would laugh at our own jokes. It would have to be a very bad day if we had to tell one another what [Stroganoff] was going to say or do – we just knew.

A Bullet in the Ballet was warmly reviewed. In The Times Literary Supplement, David Murray wrote that the book provoked "continuous laughter ... Old Stroganoff with his troubles, artistic, amorous and financial, his shiftiness, and his perpetual anxiety about the visit of the great veteran of ballet-designers – 'if 'e come', is a vital creation. ... The book stands out for shockingness and merriment." The sexual entanglements, both straight and gay, of the members of the Ballet Stroganoff are depicted with a cheerful matter-of-factness unusual in the 1930s. Murray commented, "True, a certain number of the laughs are invited for a moral subject that people used not to mention with such spade-like explicitness, if at all." In The Observer, "Torquemada" (Edward Powys Mathers) commented on the "sexual reminiscences of infinite variety" and called the novel "a delicious little satire" but "not a book for the old girl". In the 1980s, Michael Billington praised the writing: "a power of language of which Wodehouse would not have been ashamed. As a description of a domineering Russian mother put down by her ballerina daughter, you could hardly better: 'She backed away like a defeated steamroller.'"

The book was a best-seller in the UK, and was published in an American edition by Doubleday. The authors followed up their success with a sequel, Casino for Sale (1938), featuring all the survivors from the first novel and bringing to the fore Stroganoff's rival impresario, the rich and vulgar Lord Buttonhooke. It was published in the US as Murder à la Stroganoff. The Elephant is White (1939), tells the story of a young Englishman and the complications arising from his visit to a Russian night club in Paris. It was not well reviewed. A third Stroganoff novel, Envoy on Excursion (1940) was a comic spy-thriller, with Quill now working for British intelligence.

In 1940, Brahms and Simon published the first of what they called "backstairs history", producing their own highly unreliable comic retellings of English history. Don't, Mr. Disraeli! is a Victorian Romeo and Juliet story, with affairs of the feuding middle-class Clutterwick and Shuttleforth families interspersed with 19th-century vignettes ("At the Savage Club the atmosphere is tense. Gilbert and Sullivan have fallen out again.") and anachronistic intruders from the 20th century, including Harpo Marx, John Gielgud and Albert Einstein. In The Observer, Frank Swinnerton wrote, "They turn the Victorian age into phantasmagoria, dodging with the greatest possible nimbleness from the private to the public, skipping among historic scenes, which they often deride, and personal jokes and puns, and telling a ridiculous story while they communicate a preposterous – yet strangely suggestive – impression of nineteenth-century life."

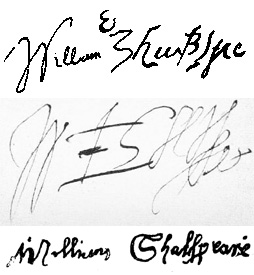
Brahms and Simon depict Shakespeare dithering over the spelling of his signature.

To follow their Victorian book, Brahms and Simon went back to Elizabethan times, with No Bed for Bacon (1941). Unlike the earlier work, the narrative and allusions are confined to the age in which the book is set. The plot concerns a young woman who disguises herself as a boy to gain membership of Richard Burbage's, and more particularly William Shakespeare's, theatrical company (a device later employed by Tom Stoppard as the central plot of his 1999 screenplay Shakespeare in Love). Reviewing the book in the Shakespeare Quarterly, Ernest Brennecke wrote:

There is plenty of fun in the lighthearted fantasy recently perpetrated by Caryl Brahms and S. J. Simon. Their book is irresponsible, irreverent, impudent, anachronistic, undocumented. The authors warn all scholars that it is also "fundamentally unsound". Poppycock! It is one of the soundest of recent jobs. The more the reader knows about Shakespeare and his England, the more chuckles and laughs he will get out of the book. It is erudite, informed, and imaginative. It solves finally the question of the "second-best" bed, Raleigh's curious obsession with cloaks, Henslowe's passion for burning down Burbage's theatres, and Shakespeare's meticulous care for his spelling.

Brahms and Simon made radio dramatisations of Don't, Mr. Disraeli! (1943) and A Bullet in the Ballet (1945); Brahms later adapted Trottie True for radio (1955). Brahms and Simon co-wrote the screenplay for the 1948 film One Night With You, and Trottie True was adapted for the cinema in 1949. Their Tudor novel, No Bed for Bacon, was dramatised for the theatre after Simon's death by Brahms and the young Ned Sherrin, with music by Malcolm Williamson and staged in 1959.

=== Bridge ===
At the same time as his collaboration with Brahms, Simon (always known as 'Skid' in the bridge world) became celebrated as a bridge player, competing in the European Team Championship in 1939 and winning the inaugural event under European Bridge League administration in 1948, a month before his death. He won the Gold Cup twice (1937 and 1947), the National Pairs (1939), and played for England in the Camrose home internationals on six occasions, all victories. Together with Jack Marx, Simon was co-developer of the Acol bidding system, a role for which he was recognized in the January 1951 issue of The Bridge World:

Through the efforts and the bridge acumen of a dozen or more British nationals or residents, among whom the late S. J. Simon was notable, British bridge has earned a place in the very highest echelons, and British bidding ideas are well worth the attention of the world's players.

— Editor's Note, The Bridge World, The American View of the Acol System, Part 1, by Alexander Spencer. January 1951, page 14.

He was author of Why You Lose at Bridge (1945); a classic book which, among other things, introduced to the world four archetypal losing players: Futile Willie, Mrs Guggenheim, Mr Smug and the Unlucky Expert. Its sequel, Cut for Partners (1950), and a book on the principles of Acol, Design for Bidding (1949), were published posthumously. He was bridge correspondent of The Observer, the London Evening News and Punch.

In this [i.e. his obituary in The Observer] I described the television date:

He had a new tie for the occasion, buttercup yellow. "Thought was technicolour", he said.

I commented on his distinctive style – the omission of the personal pronoun, the disregard for syntax – and ended:

His humour always touched the human comedy, but never with malice. For example:
At a pre-war Congress a lady who held an ace and was on lead against seven no trumps neither doubled nor led the ace. The contract was made and the story of the double omission quickly went the rounds. It was Skid who pointed out that she must be acquitted on at least one count. If she was not going to lead the ace, he said, she was quite right not to double.

— Terence Reese

He taught his team-mates to play and to laugh ... Skid lived to the age of 44 – by a series of miracles. He crossed the busiest street, nose buried in a book. He dismounted from buses travelling at full speed, nose still buried in a book. He once walked through a plate glass window during a Telegraph final ... In his books, on the radio, at the bridge table, he guyed everybody. Most of all he guyed himself ... He was the greatest character to adorn the bridge world.

— Maurice Harrison-Gray, contemporary British bridge professional, Hasenson, p. 135.

... the most colourful, the warmest and by common consent, the most likeable personality to emerge from the world of bridge.

— Victor Mollo.

In 2012, the American Contract Bridge League (ACBL) named Simon number 48 of the 52 most influential people during the 75-year lifetime of the organisation for writing Why You Lose at Bridge and co-inventing the Acol bidding system.

=== Personal life and last years ===
In 1943, Simon married [Kathleen Mary] Carmel Withers (19 July 1908 – 17 July 1949), a silver medalist in the Women Teams event of the 1948 European Bridge League championships. He died suddenly in London at the age of 44. His widow died suddenly a year later; at her inquest the verdict was suicide. She wrote fiction using the pen name Kathleen Mary Carmel.

Simon left two bridge books in manuscript, which were posthumously published in 1949 and 1950. Caryl Brahms edited and completed their one unpublished joint work of fiction, also published in 1950.

== Publications ==
=== On bridge ===
- 1945 Why You Lose at Bridge. London: Nicholson & Watson. OCLC 18352804.
- 1949 Design for Bidding. London: Nicholson & Watson. OCLC 13491181.
- 1950 Cut for Partners. London: Nicholson & Watson. OCLC 13548585.

=== Collaborations with Caryl Brahms ===
- 1937 A Bullet in the Ballet. London: Michael Joseph. OCLC 752997851.
- 1938 Casino for Sale. London: Michael Joseph. OCLC 558706784. Published in America as Murder à la Stroganoff. New York: Doubleday, Doran. 1938. OCLC 11309700.
- 1939 The Elephant is White. London: Michael Joseph. OCLC 558706826.
- 1940 Envoy on Excursion. London: Michael Joseph. OCLC 154388199.
- 1940 Don't, Mr. Disraeli!. London: Michael Joseph. OCLC 462681016.
- 1941 No Bed for Bacon. London: Michael Joseph. OCLC 558706853.
- 1944 No Nightingales. London: Michael Joseph. OCLC 558706895.
- 1945 Six Curtains for Stroganova. London: Michael Joseph. OCLC 9495601. Published in America as Six Curtains for Natasha. Philadelphia: J. B. Lippincott. 1946. OCLC 1040925.
- 1946 Trottie True. London: Michael Joseph. OCLC 475946887.
- 1947 To Hell with Hedda! and other stories. London: Michael Joseph. OCLC 8298701.
- 1950 You Were There – Eat, drink, and be merry, for yesterday you died. London: Michael Joseph. OCLC 154216656.
