= John L. Balderston =

American dramatist (1889–1954)

- Born: October 22, 1889; Philadelphia, Pennsylvania, U.S.
- Died: March 8, 1954 (aged 64); Beverly Hills, California, U.S.
- Education: Columbia University
- Occupations: Playwright, screenwriter, journalist
- Writing career
- Years active: 1912–1954
- Genres: Horror, fantasy, drama

John L. Balderston (October 22, 1889 – March 8, 1954) was an American playwright and screenwriter best remembered for his horror and fantasy scripts. He wrote the 1926 play Berkeley Square and the 1927 American adaptation of the 1924 play Dracula.

== Biography ==
John L. Balsterston was born in Philadelphia on October 22, 1889.

=== Journalist ===
Balderston began his career as a journalist in 1912 while still a student at Columbia University; he worked as the New York correspondent for The Philadelphia Record. He worked as European war correspondent during World War I for the McClure Newspaper Syndicate, then was director of information in England and Ireland for the US Committee on Public Information. In 1916, he wrote The Brooke Kerith, about the life of Jesus, with George More. In 1919, he wrote the play The Genius of the Marne. Balderston co-authored "Cross-Styx, A Morality Playlet for the Leisure Class," a part of the Dutch Treat Club's 1920 annual dinner extravaganza written by him, Fred Dayton, Rae Irvin, Berton Braley, James Montgomery Flagg with music by Arthur Samuels. Deems Taylor and Arthur Samuels were at the Steinways. From 1920 to 1923, he was the editor of The Outlook magazine in London and then head of the London bureau for the New York World from 1923 to 1931. Balderston left journalism in 1931 when the New York World ceased publication.

=== Playwright ===
Balderson wrote a play about Bacon and Shakespeare, Clown of Stratford in the mid-1920s. He achieved success as a playwright in 1926 with the London production of his play Berkeley Square which he had written with Jack Squire, the editor of the London Mercury. It was adapted from Henry James' posthumously published 1917 novel The Sense of the Past.

In 1927, he was retained by Horace Liveright to revise Hamilton Deane's 1924 stage adaptation of Dracula for its American production. Balderston did some significant work on the adaptation, which was a success when it debuted in October, running for 261 performances and making a star of Bela Lugosi. Deane then hired Balderston to adapt Peggy Webling's 1927 play version of Frankenstein for American audiences. However, this did not make it to Broadway.

Berkley Square was produced on Broadway from 1929 to 1930, starring Leslie Howard. It ran for 229 performances.

=== Screenwriter ===
Balderston's play of Dracula formed the basis of the 1931 film version starring Lugosi, made by Universal Pictures. Universal then bought his American adaptation of Peggy Webling's 1927 play Frankenstein, and used it as the basis for the film Frankenstein (also 1931). Universal hired him to adapt a story on Cagliostro in The Mummy (1932). He wrote a version of The Invisible Man for James Whale which was not used for Whale's film version.

Balderston returned to Broadway in 1932, working with J.E. Hore on Red Planet. It only ran seven performances. For MGM, he did an unused treatment of She: A History of Adventure in 1932 and did some uncredited work on Smilin' Through (1932). He is credited as screenwriter on the adaptation of Berkeley Square (1933).

Balderston was one of several writers on The Lives of a Bengal Lancer (1935), which earned him an Oscar nomination. He worked on The Mystery of Edwin Drood (1935) and Bride of Frankenstein (1935) and was the last writer on Mad Love (1935). He was an uncredited contributor to the script of Mark of the Vampire (1935) and wrote a version of Dracula's Daughter (1936) for David O. Selznick which was sold to Universal.

Balderston worked on Peter Ibbetson (1935) for Henry Hathaway. He was one of several writers on The Amazing Quest of Ernest Bliss (1936) and did The Last of the Mohicans (1936) with Philip Dunne.

Balderston wrote radio play titled The Other Place for the radio program The Fleischmann's Yeast Hour hosted by Rudy Vallee. It was aired on November 14, 1935, starring Colin Clive and Leo G. Carroll.

He adapted a Hungarian play into Farewell Performance for the English stage in 1936.

In Hollywood, Balderston specialised in British themed subjects: The Man Who Changed His Mind (1936); Beloved Enemy (1936) for Sam Goldwyn; The Prisoner of Zenda (1937) for David O. Selznick. He wrote an unused script, Murder in Church in 1938 and was one of the team of writers who collaborated on the film adaptation of Gone with the Wind (1939) for Selznick. He wrote a musical for Fox, Little Old New York (1940) then adapted Victory (1940) for Paramount.

At MGM he worked on Smilin' Through (1941), Stand By for Action (1942), and Tennessee Johnson (1942). He was also one of the writers on Gaslight (1944), which earned him his second Academy Award nomination. He also wrote a book Chicago Blueprint, which was published in 1943.

=== Later years ===
In 1948, he co-wrote a novel about Caesar and Cleopatra, A Goddess to a God.

Balderston did a treatment of Red Planet which became Red Planet Mars (1952). In 1952, he was appointed lecturer in drama at the University of Southern California.

In 1953, it was announced Balderston and the heirs of Peggy Webling had settled a lawsuit with Universal over Frankenstein. Under their original contract, they were to be paid $20,000 plus 1% gross of any films that resulted from their work, including any sequel – and there were several Frankenstein films.

He died of a heart attack in Beverly Hills on March 8, 1954.

== Select writing credits ==
- Genius of the Marne (1919)
- Berkeley Square (1927) – play
- Dracula (1927) – play – filmed in 1931 and 1979
- Dracula (1931) – script
- Frankenstein (1931) – wrote early script
- The Mummy (1932) – script
- Red Planet (play) (1932) – play
- Berkeley Square (1933) – script
- The Lives of a Bengal Lancer (1935) – script
- Mystery of Edwin Drood (1935) – script
- The Bride of Frankenstein (1935) – script
- Mark of the Vampire (1935) – uncredited writer
- Mad Love (1935) – script
- Peter Ibbetson (1935) – uncredited writer
- Dracula's Daughter (1936) – uncredited writer
- The Amazing Quest of Ernest Bliss (1936) – script
- The Last of the Mohicans (1936) – script
- The Man Who Changed His Mind (1936) – script
- Beloved Enemy (1936) – script
- The Prisoner of Zenda (1937) – script
- Gone With the Wind (1939) – uncredited writer
- Little Old New York (1940) – original story
- Victory (1940) – script
- Scotland Yard (1940) – script
- Smilin' Through (1941) – script
- Stand by for Action (1942) – script
- Tennessee Johnson (1942) – script
- Gaslight (1944) – script
